= Cold War espionage =

Aspect of the Cold War

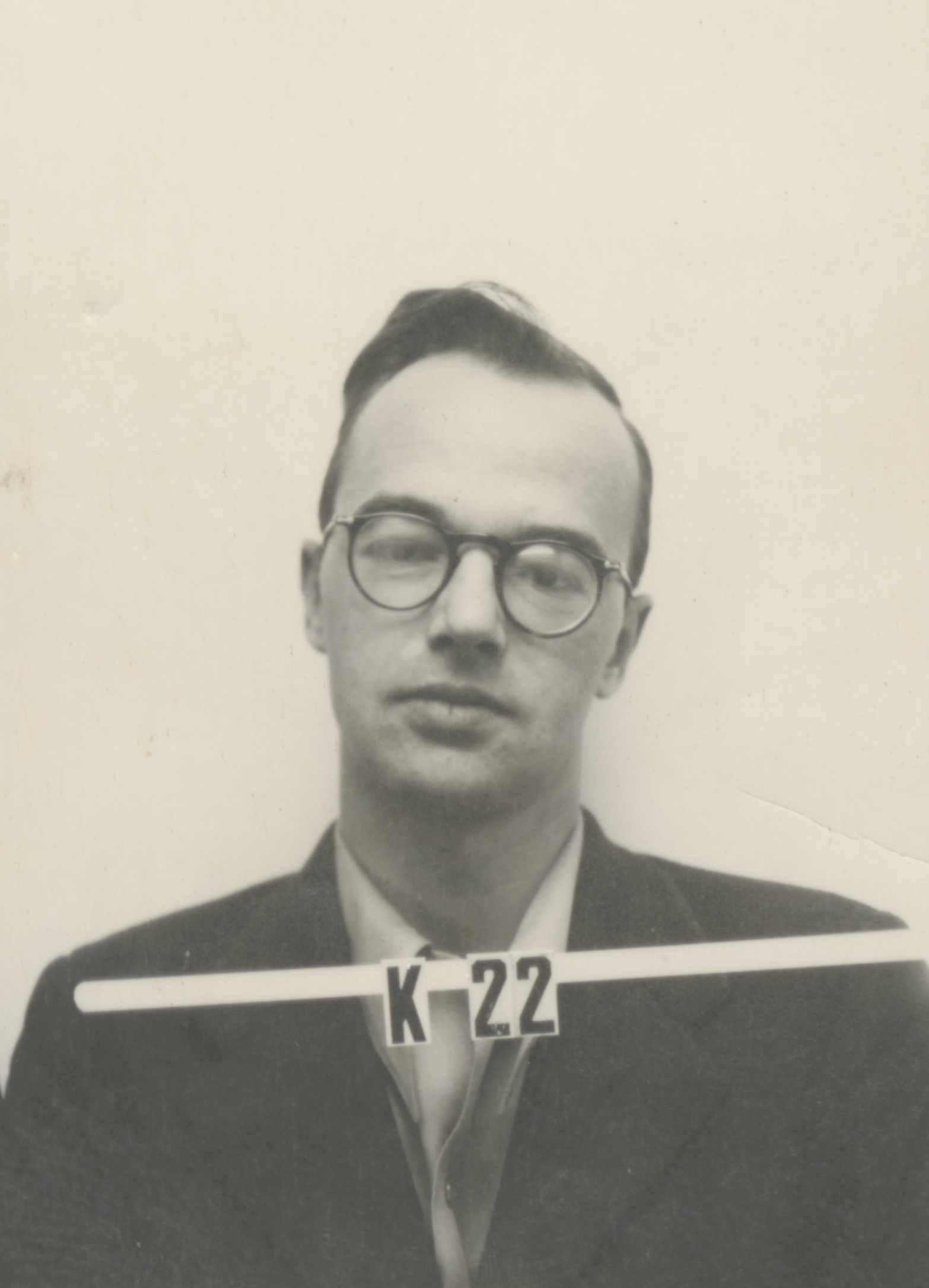
Klaus Fuchs, exposed in 1950, is considered to have been the most valuable of the atomic spies during the Manhattan Project.

Cold War espionage describes the intelligence gathering activities during the Cold War (1947–1991) between the Western allies (primarily the US and Western Europe) and the Eastern Bloc (primarily the Soviet Union and allied countries of the Warsaw Pact). Both relied on a wide variety of military and civilian agencies in this pursuit.

While several organizations such as the CIA and KGB became synonymous with Cold War espionage, many others played key roles in the collection and protection of the section concerning detection of spying, and analysis of a wide host of intelligence disciplines.

== Background ==
Soviet espionage in the United States during the Cold War was an outgrowth of World War II nuclear espionage, with both sides utilizing and evolving techniques and practices developed during World War II. Cold War espionage has been fictionally depicted in works such as the James Bond and Matt Helm books and movies.

The Cold War was a state of political and military tension after World War II led by the United States (and the Western Bloc) and the Soviet Union (and the Eastern Bloc). After World War II, the victory of the Soviet Union over Germany granted them considerable territorial spoils; the Soviet Union banded together these states economically and politically creating a superpower challenging the might of the United States. Prior even to the United States' use of nuclear bombs in Hiroshima and Nagasaki, the Soviet Union had been developing the technology to make similar devices. Although the two powers never engaged in a full-scale war, both countries were constantly preparing for an all-out nuclear war. Cold War espionage was focused on gaining an advantage in information about the enemies' capabilities, especially related to atomic weaponry.

During the Cold War, information was a key commodity. It was vital to know what the adversary was up to, and the possibility of using the hi-tech surveillance that is used today did not yet exist. Instead of trusting technology, states relied on spies: people who infiltrated enemy territory and tried to discover information while staying undetected.

Espionage activities continued from prior to the beginning of the cold war in the late thirties- early forties, and all the way through the late 1960s and even continuing through today. Due to the nature of espionage, the information that we can gather about these activities is limited, equally as limited is the prosecutorial reach with regards to people who commit espionage are subjected to (especially in the United States). These spies were decoding encrypted information, and using many skills to gain an advantage over enemy countries.

== Major spy rings ==
Cambridge Five
The Cambridge Five consisted of five members that were recruited from the University of Cambridge in the 1930s. There is debate surrounding the exact timing of their recruitment, but it is generally believed that they were not recruited as agents until after they had graduated. The group included Kim Philby (cryptonym 'Stanley'), Donald Maclean (cryptonym 'Homer'), Guy Burgess (cryptonym 'Hicks'), Anthony Blunt (cryptonyms 'Tony', 'Johnson'), and John Cairncross (cryptonym 'Liszt'). There were many others that were accused of being a part of the Cambridge Spy Ring, but these five members were collectively known as the Cambridge Five.
Portland spy ring
The Portland spy ring operated in England, as a Soviet spy ring, from the 1950s until 1961 when the core of the network were arrested by British Security Services. This spy ring was unique because they did not use the cover of an embassy as the cover for their spies. Its members included Harry Houghton, Ethel Gee, Gordon Lonsdale, and most famously Morris and Lona Cohen (cryptonym Peter and Helen Kroger).
Ware Group
Sleeper spy ring in US headed by J. Peters, first organized under Harold Ware, inherited by Whittaker Chambers (under orders from Peters), and also included: John Abt, Marion Bachrach (Abt's sister), Lee Pressman, Alger Hiss, Donald Hiss, Charles Kramer, Nathan Witt, Henry Collins, George Silverman, John Herrmann, Nathaniel Weyl, and Victor Perlo. When Chambers defected in 1938, the Ware Group went dormant and then broke up. Harry Dexter White (below) contributed materials to Chambers but not as part of the Ware Group.
Silvermaster spy ring
The Silvermaster spy ring was led by Harry Dexter White, assistant secretary of the US Treasury and the second most influential member of the Treasury department. His job was to aid placement of Soviet spies within the United States Government. The United States Treasury Department was successfully infiltrated by many Soviet spies, the most successful of which belonged to the Silvermaster Spy Ring. Harold Glasser, Elizabeth Bentley, and Nathan Silvermaster were other major members of the Silvermaster Spy Ring.
Atomic spies
While the Atomic Spies were not exactly a network of spies, the collective information that was obtained by this group of Soviet spies was critical to the Soviet Union's ability to build an atomic bomb. Many of the members of the Atomic spies group worked for, or around, the Manhattan Project, or the United States building of the atomic bomb. This group included:

Klaus Fuchs: a German-born British theoretical physicist. He worked with the British delegation on the Manhattan Project.
Morris Cohen: an American who gained insight to the plans from the secret laboratory at Los Alamos and delivered it to the designers of the Soviet atomic bomb.
Harry Gold: an American who was a courier for Klaus Fuchs and David Greenglass.
David Greenglass: an American machinist at Los Alamos during the Manhattan Project. He gave crude schematics of lab experiments to the Russians.
Theodore Hall: an American, and the youngest physicist at Los Alamos, gave a detailed description of the Fat Man plutonium bomb and several processes for purifying plutonium to the Soviets.
George Koval: an American-born son of a Russian family. He obtained information from the Oak Ridge National Laboratory and the Dayton Project about the Urchin (detonator) used for the Fat Man plutonium bomb.
Irving Lerner: an American film director who was caught photographing the cyclotron at the University of California in 1944.
Alan Nunn May: a British physicist who worked for the British nuclear research and then in Canada on the Manhattan Project. His uncovering in 1946 was responsible for the United States restricting sharing atomic secrets with the British.
Julius and Ethel Rosenberg: Americans who were involved in the coordinating and recruiting of an espionage network. Ethel's brother was David Greenglass.
Saville Sax: an American who acted as a courier for Klaus Fuchs and Theodore Hall.
Morton Sobell: an American engineer who admitted to spying for the Soviets and uncovered how extensive the Rosenberg's recruiting network was.

== Chronology ==
Chronology
Date	Topic	Event
1939		Whittaker Chambers meets with Assistant Secretary of State Adolf Berle; names 18 current and former government employees as spies or Communist sympathizers including Alger Hiss, Donald Hiss, Laurence Duggan, and Lauchlin Currie. Berle notified the Federal Bureau of Investigation (FBI) of Chambers's information in March 1940.
1941-08-10		The Soviet GRU reestablished contact with Klaus Fuchs, a German emigre scientist, who transferred from the British Tube Alloys nuclear research program to the US-led Manhattan Project in 1943.
1942	Nuclear espionage	US communist Jacob Golos put Julius and Ethel Rosenberg (and their associated communist cell) in direct contact with Soviet intelligence operatives in New York. The Rosenberg cell provided information on newest developments in electrical and radio engineering to the XY Line of the NKGB foreign intelligence.
1944	Nuclear espionage	Yuri Modin became the KGB controller of the "Cambridge Five" ring of atomic spies.
1945		Starting in November 1945, Elizabeth Bentley, under the code name 'Gregory', started naming almost 150 Union Spies; among those, at least 35 were in fact federal government employees.
1946-12-20		The Venona counter-intelligence program is first able to decode Soviet intelligence messages thereby discovering the Soviet spying activities within the Manhattan Project. The project operated for 37 years and obtained around 3,000 messages, some lead to the discovery of the Cambridge Five and other messages led to the discovery of Soviet spies (including The Rosenbergs) operating within a US nuclear facility.
1949	Nuclear espionage	A Mossad agent assumed, seeing CIA agent James Jesus Angleton dining with Cambridge Five mole Kim Philby, that the former had turned the latter into a triple agent.
1950		Klaus Fuchs voluntarily confesses to MI5 that he has been spying for the USSR. Fuchs identifies Harry Gold who identifies David Greenglass which in turn leads to the arrest and trial of the Rosenbergs.
August 1952	Communications interception	Operation Vagabond-Able launches floating transmitter USCGC Courier the most powerful radio broadcasting station on a ship. Additional to broadcasting VOA programming to countries behind the Iron Curtain, Courier docked at Rhodes Greece received information from American spies in the Soviet Union and relayed info to the US. Ship was manned by US Coast Guard, USIA, CIA, and funded by US State Department. Template:Cite online CIA memorandum USIA : Possible Intelligence Training Needs : https://www.cia.gov/readingroom/document/cia-rdp78-06365a000800010020-2
August 1955	Communications interception	Joint US/UK (CIA/SIS) Operation Gold puts a tunnel under the frontier in occupied Berlin to tap into Soviet army communications. Already aware of the plan through George Blake, the Soviets let the operation run rather than compromise their agent.
April 1956	Communications interception	The Soviets discover the tunnel being used to tap their communications and to protect their mole George Blake, they stage a crew to accidentally discover the tunnel. However, in just the short time it was operational, the tap collected about 40,000 hours of Soviet telephone conversations.
1959-06	Corona (satellite)	Under the covername Discoverer the camera-carrying Corona satellite missions start.
1959-10-15	Active measures	Ukrainian politician Stepan Bandera was assassinated on KGB orders.
1960	1960 U-2 incident	Pilot Francis Gary Powers' Lockheed U-2 spy plane was shot down by a Soviet surface-to-air missile. The US is forced to publicly admit that they were operating surveillance missions over the USSR.
August 1960		Discoverer 14 is the first Corona mission to successfully take reconnaissance pictures from orbit and return them to earth.
1961		The Berlin Wall is erected, marking the Soviet desire to stop the flow of goods and information into their territory clear. At this time, the importance of East Berlin as an intelligence base for the US located within Soviet territory was solidified.
1962		Oleg Penkovsky provides information to SIS and CIA about Soviet missile capabilities and deployment to Cuba. The Soviets are aware of his activities through their own agent within the NSA.
1962-10-26	Cuban Missile Crisis	Under the pseudonym of Aleksandr Fomin, the KGB Station Chief in Washington proposed the crisis' diplomatic solution.
1964	Operation Neptune	A ruse was used to indicate West Germany's spies remaining from World War II had been exposed.
1974		Oleg Gordievsky, a KGB agent becomes a double agent of MI6. In 1982, Gordievsky is given position as KGB's Resident in London in charge of intelligence gathering in UK.
1985-03-23	Military liaison missions	On a mission to photograph a Soviet tank storage building, US intelligence officer Major Arthur D. Nicholson was killed by a Soviet soldier.

== Known spies ==
=== Working for the Western Bloc ===
- Aleksandr Dmitrievich Ogorodnik- A Soviet Diplomat who photographed confidential diplomatic cables and sent them to the US.
- Arkady Shevchenko- A Soviet Diplomat and the highest ranking Soviet to defect to the west. As Under Secretary General at the United Nations, he passed on Soviet secrets to US officials.
- Boris Morros- Originally a Soviet agent, Morros became an FBI informant who reported on the Sobel Spy ring.
- Boris Yuzhin- A double agent who while working at the KGB revealed Soviet recruitment programs.
- Gerry Droller- A German CIA official who recruited Cuban Exiles for the Bay of Pigs invasion.
- Heinz Barwich- A German Nuclear Physicist who worked on the Soviet atomic bomb project. He defected to the West in 1964 and testified before the US Senate.
- John Birch- An American Baptist Missionary who was killed gathering intelligence during the Chinese Civil War.
- Miles Copeland Jr.- A CIA agent who had a hand in the overthrow of the Syrian government in 1949 and the Iranian government of 1953.
- Milton Bearden- US CIA Station Chief in Pakistan during the Afghanistan Civil War
- Nicholas Shadrin- A Soviet Naval Officer who defected to the West.
- Oleg Lyalin - Soviet agent that defected from the KGB. Lyalin's defection was forced by his arrest in London. Was given a new identity and placed into a protective housing until his death in 1995.
- Otto von Bolschwing- A former Nazi spy who was recruited by the US before the end of the war. Played a part in the Greek Civil War.
- Philip Agee- An American CIA agent who became repulsed by CIA actions abroad. He was accused of attempting to sell state secrets to Soviet and Cuba officials, a charge that he denied up until his death.
- Robert Baer- A former CIA agent, now a writer, and inspiration for George Clooney's character in the film "Syriana."
- Ruth Fischer- Co-founder of the Austrian Communist Party. Became disillusioned with Stalinism. See also "The Pond."
- Yosef Amit- A former Israeli intelligence official. Recruited by the CIA and revealed Israeli troop positions and Israeli foreign policy goals.
- Yuri Nosenko- A KGB defector who experienced harsh interrogation techniques at the hands of the CIA.
- Adolf Tolkachev- A Soviet electronic engineer who provided key documents to the CIA.
- Michael Goleniewski- Polish triple agent who potentially helped identify more Soviet spies than any other defector. He also alleged there was a Soviet-controlled organisation of former Nazis - which he nicknamed 'Hacke' - that was active in postwar West Germany.

=== Working for the Eastern Bloc ===
- Aldrich Ames - (born May 26, 1941) - A Central Intelligence Agency (CIA) operative for over thirty-one years but was a KGB mole.
- Elizabeth Bentley
- Louis F. Budenz - Labor Activist in the United States. Became a member of the Communist Party and later headed Buben Group of Spies.
- Ethel Gee - minor member of the Portland spy ring
- Konon Molody - leader of the Portland spy ring
- Dieter Gerhardt - Convicted Soviet spy in South Africa along with his wife of many years who acted as his courier.
- David Greenglass - atomic spy specialist that worked in both the Manhattan Project, the Uranium Facility in Oak Ridge, Tennessee, and at the Los Alamos facility in New Mexico. Arrested in June 1950
- Gunvor Galtung Haavik - Employee for the Norwegian Ministry of Foreign Affairs. Arrested in January 1977. Betrayed by another Soviet spy.
- Robert Hanssen - FBI agent who spied for the Soviet Union.
- Robert Lee Johnson- An American sergeant that joined the KGB when stationed in East Berlin. Turned in by his wife and sentenced to 25 years in prison. Johnson was killed by his own son in 1972.
- Alexander Koral - Well known member of the Communist Party of the United States of America (CPUSA). Was in charge of many Soviet Spies residing in the United States during World War II and the Cold War era.
- Andrew Daulton Lee - Collaborated with a childhood friend, Christopher John Boyce (an American Defense Industry Employee). Lee bought United States satellite secrets and sold them to the Soviet Union. He was arrested in December 1976 under suspicion of killing a Mexico City Police Officer.
- Hede Massing - Austrian Actress turned Soviet intelligence operative in both the United States and Europe. Member of the "Redhead group".
- Alexandru Nicolschi - (Александр Серге́евич Никольский) A Romanian communist activist and Soviet agent under the Communist Regime. Remained active until the 1960s. Was supportive of violent politics. General inspector for the secret police.
- Selmer Nilsen - Nilsen was a spy for the GRU during the Cold War. Stationed in Bodø for approximately seven years. Arrested after seventeen years of espionage in 1967. Was pardoned in 1971.
- Alan Nunn May- A convicted Soviet Spy and former British Physicist. Gave atomic research secrets to the Soviet Union during the gray area of World War II and the Cold War beginning. Confessed to charges of espionage in 1946. Did not believe that his acts should be defined as treason.
- Earl Edwin Pitts - Federal Bureau of Investigation special agent turned Soviet Spy. Arrested in an FBI sting operation. Pleaded guilty to charges of espionage in 1997.
- Geoffrey Prime
- Norman J. Rees oil engineer, Soviet agent, then double agent for FBI; committed suicide after exposure by newspaper
- John Alexander Symonds - English metropolitan police officer who also worked as a KGB agent. During the 1970s, Symonds was assigned to be a "Romeo spy", directed to work as a playboy and seduce women working in Western embassies while trying to learn other country's secrets. He revealed himself to be a KGB agent in the 1980s. Surprisingly, Symonds was never prosecuted or convicted.
- Julian Wadleigh - Worked for the Department of State in the United States of America in the 1930s and 1940s. Was a key witness in the trials of Alger Hiss. Wadleigh's main goal in being a spy was to stop the rise of Fascism. He strongly believed that the information he took from the Department of State could not be used against the United States, but that it could be used against Germany and Japan.
- John Anthony Walker - United States Navy Chief Warrant Officer and communications specialist. Convicted of espionage for the Soviet Union from 1968 to 1985. Was required to testify against former chief petty officer Jerry Whitworth. Walker's job duties allowed him to inform the Soviet Union where the United States' submarines would be located.
- Theodore Hall - American physicist and Soviet spy who passed atomic secrets to Soviet intelligence during the Manhattan Project, and hydrogen bomb information after 1946.
- Johannes Clemens - a former Gestapo who served the Soviets as a double agent reporting on West German intelligence.
- Hans Sommer - a former SD deputy who initially identified Soviet spies for West German intelligence, then flipped to the Soviets until 1953 when he was fired, after which he worked for the East German Stasi.
- Heinz Felfe - a former Nazi officer who became “Moscow's most important mole in the West German intelligence service” and exposed over 100 CIA agents in the Soviet Union. Felfe was a Soviet double agent in West Germany from about 1951 to his arrest in 1961.
- Kim Philby - Soviet double agent within British intelligence, recruited in Austria in 1934. He passed secrets to the Soviets as a member of the Cambridge Five until 1963. He came from an upper-class background, and seemed particularly devoted to his belief in communism during almost 30 years as a spy.
- Markus Wolf - the spymaster for the East German Stasi, seen for many years as an elusive "man without a face" by Western intelligence.
- Jeffrey Carney - an East German spy.

== Surveillance devices ==
1. Sight Unseen - an F21 'Ammer' spy camera. Currently on exhibit in Berlin, Germany. Used by the Stasi secret police.
2. Maxwell Smart's Other Shoe- A miniature camera stowed in the heel of the spy's shoe. This gadget was used by most spies at the time including those in the CIA.
3. Can You Hear Me Now? - an eavesdropping device
4. Photo Overdrive - A tool that was much larger than many other spy equipment. Technicians created a car door that would take hidden, infrared camera images at night.
5. KGB Disappearing Ink Pen - Invisible inks were very commonly used by spies during the Cold War. When used a spy would need to steam the ink, dry the paper, and re-steam it in order to get rid of any indentations.
6. "Belly Buster" Drill - A CIA gadget developed in the 1960s. Used to drill holes into rooms for the planting or mounting of listening devices
7. Letter Remover
8. Dragonfly Insectothopter - Classified as a UAV (Unmanned Aerial Vehicle). Contained a hidden camera and designed to look like a dragonfly.
9. Microdot Camera - Using a period sized film, this device was used to film pages of secret documents.
10. Spy Wallet - a camera hidden inside a wallet
11. F-21 Pocket Camera - Issued by the KGB. Concealed in a buttonhole with a wire running to a device that allows the spy to take a picture.
12. Louder, Please, MyWatch Can't Hear You
13. American-British Spy Tunnel

== American satellite surveillance systems ==
Weapons System 117L - Weapons System 117L was the first program designed to develop space-based reconnaissance satellite systems. Several satellite systems would be developed through this program including Corona, the Satellite and Missile Observation System (SAMOS), and the Missile Detection Alarm System (MIDAS).

SAMOS
SAMOS or the Satellite and Missile Observation system was one of the first of a series of short lived satellite systems developed by the United States, operated from October 1960 to November 1962. The SAMOS satellite system was one of the first systems developed through the WS-117L program. The system consisted of three primary components: visual reconnaissance, communications, and electronic intelligence gathering. Of the eleven launched attempted, 8 were successful. The program was likely cancelled because of poor image quality. The satellite could produce photos with 100 foot resolution. It was also heavily overshadowed by the Corona system operated by the CIA.
MIDAS
MIDAS or the Missile Defense Alarm System was a satellite system operated by the United States between 1960 and 1966. This system was designed to be made of twelve satellites, although only nine satellites were successfully launched. The system was designed to provide early warning of Soviet missile launches. The system was eventually cancelled because of the high price and because of the slow warning times. This system, however, would be directly responsible for technologies used in its successors.
Corona
Corona was among the first of a series of reconnaissance satellite systems developed through the WS-117L program. The Corona program was headed by the Central Intelligence Agency along with the Air Force. Corona satellites were used to photograph Soviet and other installations. The first successful Corona mission began on August 10, 1963. The Corona satellite system was expedited largely in part to the U-2 incident in 1960. All of the Corona missions, with the exception of the KH-11 Kennan program, would make use of photographic film, which would have to survive re-entry through the atmosphere and be recovered.
Keyhole
Keyhole was the designation for the initial Corona launches, which included KH-1, KH-2, KH-3, KH-4A, and KH-4B. The name was used because it is analogous to spying through the keyhole of a door. 144 satellites would be launched through this program, and 102 returned usable photos.
Keyhole/Argon (KH-5)
Argon was the designation the surveillance satellites, manufactured by Lockheed, used by the United States from February 1961 to August 1964. Argon made use of photographic film in a way similar of the original Corona satellites. Of the twelve known launches, seven were not successful for varying reasons.
Keyhole/Lanyard (KH-6)
Lanyard was the designation for the first, albeit unsuccessful, attempt to establish a high resolution, optical satellite system. This program would be led by the newly established National Reconnaissance Office, and operated from March–July 1963. Because it was only able to achieve a resolution similar to that of the KH-4 satellites, it was discontinued after only 3 launches.
Keyhole/Gambit (KH-7)
Gambit was the next of a series of satellites operated by the United States, by the National Reconnaissance Office, from July 1963 to June 1967. It was among the first successful Corona missions as it produced some of the first high resolution photos. These photos were typically of Soviet and Chinese missile emplacements. Gambit satellites would make use of a three camera system and missions would last typically up to eight days.
Keyhole/Gambit III (KH-8)
The Gambit III satellite system was amongst the longest serving satellite reconnaissance programs operated by the United States during the Cold War. This satellite system would operate from July 1966 to April 1984. Of the fifty-four launch attempts, only three would fail, all of which were attributed to rocket failure. The average mission time of the Gambit III satellite systems were thirty-one days. The Gambit III satellites would differ from the Gambit I satellites in that the Gambit III had a four camera system, which carried over twelve thousand feet of film, and were able to produce resolutions as small as four inches.
Keyhole/Hexagon (KH-9)
The Hexagon satellite system, commonly known as Big Bird, this satellite system was operated from 1971 and 1986. The Hexagon system was officially known as the Broad Coverage Photo Reconnaissance satellites. These satellites photographed large areas of the Earth at a time with moderate resolution. These satellites were also used for mapping missions, which were used in map making. Three Hexagon missions also included electronic intelligence or ELINT gathering capabilities. These were used to eavesdrop on soviet communications and on soviet missile launches. Twenty launches were attempted, only one was unsuccessful. These satellites operated for an increasing duration of time, with the longest mission lasting 275 days.
Keyhole/Kennan (KH-11)
The KH-11 Kennan, which goes under the code name Crystal, was first launched in 1976, and missions are still ongoing. According to leaked documents, this program is currently operation under the code name Evolved Enhanced Crystal. The Kennan satellite system was the first satellite system to use electro-optical imaging, which gives real time imaging capabilities. The resolution of these satellites is estimated to be as low as 2 inches. These satellites are unique in that they have been placed in Sun-synchronous orbits, which allow them to use shadows to help discern ground features. These satellites became famous in 1978 when a CIA employee tried to leak the design of the satellite to the Soviets. He was tried and convicted of espionage.
Keyhole/Improved Crystal (KH-12)
The later KH-11 satellites have been called KH-12 improved Crystal or Ikon satellites. These satellites also had increased download times which allowed for faster processing of photos. It is also suspected that these satellites may have stealth technology to avoid detection by other satellites.
Vela
The Vela satellite system was developed to by the United States to ensure that the Soviet Union complied with the Partial Test Ban Treaty which was ratified in 1963. The satellites were designed to monitor for nuclear explosions in space and in the atmosphere by measuring for neutrons and gamma rays. A total of twelve Vela satellites were launched during the course of the Cold War. The Vela satellites became publicly famous because of the Vela Incident which occurred on 22 September 1979. It was theorized at the time that it was a nuclear test conducted by South Africa and Israel, but new evidence does not support this theory. They have also been used in the study of Gamma-Ray Bursts.

== American surveillance aircraft ==
U-2
The U-2 aircraft, known as the "Dragon Lady", was developed by the Lockheed Skunk Works, and was first flown on August 1, 1955. The aircraft was initially flown by the CIA, but control was later transferred to the Air Force. The aircraft was designed to fly at altitudes of 70,000 ft. The U-2 was equipped with a camera which had a resolution of 2.5 feet at an altitude of 60,000 ft. The first overflights of the Soviet Union by the U-2 began in May 1956. The aircraft became publicly prominent after a U-2 aircraft flown by Francis Gary Powers was hit by an SA-2 missile and crash landed in the USSR.
SR-71
The SR-71 Blackbird is a long-range reconnaissance aircraft developed by Lockheed Skunk Works, and designed by Kelly Johnson. The aircraft is known for setting speed and altitude records. The SR-71 was equipped with optical and infrared imaging systems, electronic intelligence gathering systems, side looking airborne radar, and recorders for those systems which are listed. The aircraft required two personnel to pilot it, one to pilot the aircraft, and a Reconnaissance Systems Officer (RSO) to operate the systems.

== Soviet satellite surveillance systems ==
Zenit (Zenith)
The Zenith Satellite program, was a satellite program developed by the Soviet Union and used from 1961 to 1994. During the course of its lifespan over 500 Zenith satellites were launched, making it the most used satellite system ever. The Soviets concealed the nature of the system by giving the satellites the Kosmos designation. The Zenith satellites had an advantage over the satellites developed by the United States, in that they could be reused. A total of eight variants would be developed for a variety of mission types, ranging from high-resolution photography to ELINT to cartographic and topographic missions.
Yantar
The Yantar satellites, designed to replace the Zenit satellite system, are among the newest Russian satellites. Yantar satellites have been launched as recently as 2015. Two variants of the satellite have been developed for high-resolution photography and for medium-resolution broad spectrum imaging.

== Historiography ==
After 1990s new memoirs and archival materials have opened up the study of espionage and intelligence during the Cold War. Scholars are reviewing how its origins, its course, and its outcome were shaped by the intelligence activities of the United States, the Soviet Union, and other key countries. Special attention is paid to how complex images of one's adversaries were shaped by secret intelligence that is now publicly known.

The Soviet Union proved especially successful in placing spies in Britain and West Germany. It was largely unable to repeat its successes in the 1930s in the United States. NATO, on the other hand, also had a few successes of importance, of whom Oleg Gordievsky was perhaps the most influential. He was a senior KGB officer who was a double agent on behalf of Britain's MI6, providing a stream of high-grade intelligence that had an important influence on the thinking of Margaret Thatcher and Ronald Reagan in the 1980s. He was spotted by Aldrich Ames a Soviet agent who worked for the CIA, but he was successfully exfiltrated from Moscow in 1985. Biographer Ben McIntyre argues he was the West's most valuable human asset, especially for his deep psychological insights into the inner circles of the Kremlin. He convinced Washington and London that the fierceness and bellicosity of the Kremlin was a product of fear, and military weakness, rather than an urge for world conquest. Thatcher and Reagan concluded they could moderate their own anti-Soviet rhetoric, as successfully happened when Mikhail Gorbachev took power, thus ending the Cold War.

== See also ==
- Communist front
- List of Eastern Bloc agents in the United States
- List of KGB defectors
- List of Soviet and Eastern Bloc defectors
- List of Western Bloc defectors
- Mitrokhin Archive
- Moynihan Commission on Government Secrecy
- Petrov Affair
- Soviet espionage in the United States
