= Ring of Spies =

1964 British film by Robert Tronson

- Original UK 1-sheet poster
- Directed by: Robert Tronson
- Written by: Peter Barnes; Frank Launder
- Produced by: Leslie Gilliat
- Starring: Bernard Lee; William Sylvester; Margaret Tyzack; David Kossoff; Nancy Nevinson; Thorley Walters
- Cinematography: Arthur Lavis
- Edited by: Thelma Connell
- Production company: British Lion
- Distributed by: BLC Films (UK); Paramount Pictures (US)
- Release date: 24 March 1964
- Running time: 90 minutes
- Country: United Kingdom
- Language: English

Ring of Spies (also known as Ring of Treason) is a 1964 British spy film directed by Robert Tronson and starring Bernard Lee, William Sylvester and Margaret Tyzack. It was written by Peter Barnes and Frank Launder based on the real-life case of the Portland spy ring, whose activities prompted "Reds under the bed" scare stories in the British popular press in the early 1960s.

== Plot ==
Harry Houghton, a dissatisfied and alcoholic embassy attaché, disgraces himself at an official garden party in Warsaw, Poland. Knowing he is to be disciplined the following day, he says goodbye to his girlfriend, who reports back to the Russian embassy about his inevitable return to England. Despite a poor report from his previous superiors, Houghton is posted to the top secret Admiralty Underwater Weapons Establishment at Portland, a Royal Navy equipment testing facility. Houghton is soon approached by secret Soviet intelligence to hand over documents to them, as he apparently had in Warsaw, with the veiled threat of blackmail. He agrees to do so, but for pay. He begins an affair with a fellow records clerk, Ethel "Bunty" Gee. Gee has access to more important secret documents, and is groomed by Houghton and his new handler Alex. Together, the couple begin to procure top secret documents for Soviet intelligence for money. When a fellow officer at the base receives poison pen letters, the shortlist of possible suspects includes Houghton. As a matter of routine, Houghton is followed by the security services, who find his high-spending habits suspicious. They plant listening devices in his house, and hear Alex's name mentioned as a source of funds. The couple, Alex, as well as Peter and Helen Kroger who transmitted the information to Russia are arrested, and sentenced at the Old Bailey. The film carries a pre-title prologue about the history of spying, and an epilogue warning cinemagoers that there could be spies in the auditorium, possibly in the very row from which they are watching the film.

== Cast ==
- Bernard Lee as Henry Houghton
- William Sylvester as Gordon Lonsdale
- Margaret Tyzack as Elizabeth Gee
- David Kossoff as Peter Kroger
- Nancy Nevinson as Helen Kroger
- Thorley Walters as Cmdr. Winters
- Philip Latham as Captain Ray
- Cyril Chamberlain as Anderson
- Justine Lord as Christina
- Patrick Barr as Captain Warner
- Derek Francis as Chief Supt. Croft
- Paul Eddington as Partygoer
- Gillian Lewis as Marjorie Shaw
- Richard Marner as Colonel Monat
- Hector Ross as Supt. Woods
- André Mikhelson as Russian Embassy official
- Garry Marsh as 1st member at Lord's
- Basil Dignam as 2nd member at Lord's
- Geoffrey Palmer as Police Officer
- Brian Nissen as Portland official
- Edwin Apps as Blake
- Fred Griffiths as news vendor
- Bryan Pringle as stakeout P.C.
- Anita West as Tilly

== Production ==
It was shot at Shepperton Studios and on location around London including many of the sites involved in the real case. The film's sets were designed by Norman Arnold.

== Release ==
The film was made just after the trial in 1961 but its release was delayed for legal reasons.

Sidney Gilliat said the film received a limited release due to fear of prosecution.

It was re-released in 1970 after the release of Harry Houghton and Ethel Gee from prison.

== Reception ==
=== Box office ===
The film did not perform well in its initial release.

=== Critical reception ===
Monthly Film Bulletin said "This more or less factual account of events in the Portland spy case has rather the effect of a newspaper serialisation, in which facts and times are carefully recorded, but no one has gone very far with speculation about how the people concerned might actually talk and feel. Only at the end, with the spies under suspicion, does tension begin to creep in; and only in one scene – Lonsdale’s arrival at the Ruislip villa, with Mrs. Kroger playing the dual role of suburban hostess and secret agent – does the film hit off the mixture of the bizarre and the quietly commonplace (rendezvous in Derry and Toms’ roof garden; arrest in the Waterloo Road) that was obviously aimed at. George Blake puts in a brief and strange appearance, passing on information to a Russian outside the pavilion at Lord’s, under surveillance by British Intelligence. The film, which has introduced itself with a capsule history of spying, ends with the cheerful warning that a spy may be occupying the next seat at the cinema."

TV Guide gave the film 2.5 out of 5 stars, writing that the film "concentrates on factual evidence leading up to the crack in the case. Lending an air of authenticity, shots of the actual spies appear in the opening frames," and concluded that "despite the documentary flavour, there are a few witty touches by the hand of Tronson".

David Parkinson in the Radio Times gave it 3 out of 5 stars, and felt "the docudramatic style rather undermines director Robert Tronson's attempts to build suspense," but "Frank Launder proved himself to be just as capable of turning out a nail-biting thriller, as he was of crafting a chortle-worthy comedy. For once, separated from his usual partner, Sidney Gilliat (although the latter's brother Leslie acted as producer), Launder and co-writer Peter Barnes capably retell the story of the Portland spy ring."
