= Ethel Gee =

British spy for the Soviet Union (1914–1984)

- Born: 10 May 1914; Isle of Portland, Dorset, England
- Died: 7 June 1984 (aged 70); Poole, Dorset, England
- Other name: Bunty
- Spouse: Harry Houghton
- Espionage activity
- Allegiance: KGB
- Service branch: Portland spy ring

Ethel Elizabeth Gee (10 May 1914 – 7 June 1984) was an Englishwoman who was a spy for the Soviet Union. She was a member of the Portland spy ring.

== Early life ==
The daughter of a blacksmith, Ethel Gee lived on the Isle of Portland, England. She left school at 15 to begin employment. In October 1950, she became a filing clerk at the Admiralty Underwater Weapons Establishment at Portland. She thus handled top secret documents on Britain's underwater warfare work and HMS Dreadnought, the Royal Navy's first nuclear submarine. Single, Gee had limited social life, since her spare time was spent looking after ageing relatives, including her mother, aunt and uncle.

== Spying career ==
Around 1955, Gee met Harry Houghton, a former sailor who had become a civil service clerk. Houghton was an alcoholic; his marriage ended in divorce in 1956. They would later pose as a married couple when they booked into London hotels.

Houghton had been supplying military secrets to spies from the Polish People's Republic and the Soviet Union for some time. Through Gee, he gained access to more classified material. In July 1960, Houghton introduced Gee to a man whom she claimed to know only as "Alex Johnson", allegedly a commander in the US Navy. "Johnson" wanted to know how the British handled confidential information provided them by the Americans.

Houghton and Gee were already under surveillance by the British Security Service MI5. A Soviet mole code named "Sniper", subsequently identified as the defector Michael Goleniewski, had warned Western intelligence that information was being leaked from Portland. Houghton's extravagance, which went far beyond his salary, made him an obvious suspect.

MI5 identified "Johnson" as Gordon Lonsdale, a Canadian businessman. (It would be only much later, when he was in prison, that he was identified as Konon Trofimovich Molody, a Soviet KGB agent.) Gee provided classified material to Houghton, who would photograph it and pass it to Lonsdale in London. On 6 January 1961, Gee left the naval base with pamphlets that contained details of an ASDIC sonar device used to detect submarines.

The following day, Houghton and Gee were arrested in London by Special Branch detectives. Also arrested were Lonsdale and Peter and Helen Kroger (alias Morris and Lona Cohen), all of whom were spies working for the Soviets. They were the core members of the Portland spy ring.

Files released in September 2019 indicated that Houghton, and perhaps Gee, could have been arrested in 1957 but MI5 ignored warnings from his spouse as the "outpourings of a disgruntled and jealous wife". The Security Service finally acted only after it received a tip from a CIA agent who was a mole in the Polish intelligence service. Gee always claimed that she had acted out of affection for Houghton, and that seemed to have been confirmed by letters (also released, in redacted form) that she had written to him in 1962.

== Trial ==
Gee at first protested her innocence, maintaining her claim that she believed that Lonsdale was an American. In the course of the trial, she stated: "In the light of what transpires now, I have done something terribly wrong, but at that time I did not think I had done anything criminal".

Houghton and Gee were both sentenced to 15 years in prison on 22 March 1961. The other spies were given longer sentences but were exchanged early on for captured British agents and citizens. Gee and Houghton served nine years and were released on 12 May 1970; they married in 1971. Ethel Houghton died in obscurity in Poole, Dorset, in 1984, leaving an estate valued for probate at £16,474 (equivalent to £53,656 in 2025).
