= Harry Houghton =

British naval petty officer who spied for Poland

- Born: 7 June 1905; Lincoln, England
- Died: 23 May 1985 (aged 79); Fleetsbridge, Poole, Dorset, England
- Occupations: Sailor, civil servant, spy
- Spouse: Ethel Gee (m. 1971)
- Military career
- Allegiance: United Kingdom
- Branch: Royal Navy
- Rank: Chief petty officer
- Conflicts: Second World War

Harry Frederick Houghton (7 June 1905 – 23 May 1985) was a British Naval SNCO and a spy for the Polish People's Republic and the Soviet Union during the Cold War. He was a member of the Portland spy ring.

== Early life ==
Houghton was born in Lincoln, England. He left school at 14 to become an errand boy and later joined the Royal Navy. By the end of the Second World War he was a chief petty officer.

After the war, he joined the civil service and in 1951 was attached to the staff of the naval attaché of the British embassy in Warsaw, Poland. Houghton dabbled in the black market, starting with coffee and moving on to medical drugs (in his memoirs, Houghton admits to the former but denies the latter). That made him money and acquaintances but also led him to heavy drinking and the attention of the Polish Secret Police.

Houghton's wife complained of domestic abuse, and there were concerns that he was mixing with the wrong people. In 1952, he was ordered home. Houghton and his wife separated in 1956 and later divorced.

== Spying career ==
Houghton was appointed to the Admiralty Underwater Weapons Establishment, Portland, where the Royal Navy would test equipment for undersea warfare. Around 1955 he became involved with Ethel Gee, known as "Bunty", a filing clerk who also worked at the base.

Houghton had his access to secret papers restricted around 1956 after he took secret papers out of the strongroom without the consent of his superiors. By this time, he was passing secrets to Polish spies, who sent them to the Soviets. He persuaded Gee, apparently telling her of his connection to the Russians, to assist him in gaining access to documents for which he did not have clearance. Gee passed them to Houghton, and he would photograph them. On the first Saturday of each month, Houghton would go to London, sometimes with Gee, and exchange packages with a contact whom they knew as Gordon Lonsdale, in reality Konon Molody, a non-official (illegal) KGB intelligence agent posing as a Canadian businessman who was the mastermind of what was to be called the Portland spy ring.

Houghton's drinking did not stop, and he was living far beyond his salary, which brought him under suspicion. MI5 placed him under surveillance and found other members of the Portland spy ring.

In his book Spycatcher, Peter Wright claimed that Houghton first came to MI5's attention when a Polish mole, codenamed Sniper, reported he had information about a Russian spy in the British Navy. According to Wright, Sniper did not know the name of the spy but said that it sounded like "Horton". Sniper also obtained documents that had been sent by the spy, helping MI5 to determine who had access to the documents. The information from Sniper said the spy had been sent home from Warsaw for drunkenness, pointing to Houghton.

Houghton and Gee were arrested with Lonsdale (his real identity was not yet known) by Special Branch officers on 7 January 1961 near the Old Vic theatre. The other Soviet spies, Morris and Lona Cohen (whose cover names were Peter and Helen Kroger) were also arrested.

Houghton claimed at his trial that he had been blackmailed by the Poles and the Russians into spying for them. In Poland, he had had an affair with a female black-marketeer and was told that she would go to prison if he did not provide secrets. Threats were also made against Gee and Houghton's former wife, and he claimed that he was twice attacked by thugs. Houghton claimed that the information that he gave was newspaper cuttings and matters that were already in the public domain.

Files released in September 2019 indicated that Houghton, and perhaps Gee, could have been arrested in 1957 but that MI5 ignored warnings from Houghton's spouse as the "outpourings of a disgruntled and jealous wife". Mrs. Houghton had advised the Admiralty in 1956 that "her husband was divulging secret information to people who ought not to get it". The Security Service finally acted only after it received a tip from a CIA agent who was a mole in the Polish intelligence service.

== Later life ==
On 22 March 1961, Houghton and Gee were both sentenced to fifteen years in prison. They were released early on 12 May 1970, and they married in 1971. Around this period, Houghton wrote Operation Portland: The Autobiography of a Spy, which was published in 1972 by Hart-Davis. Houghton died in obscurity in Poole, Dorset in 1985, a year after Ethel. He left an estate valued for probate at £114,071 (equivalent to £353,304 in 2025).
