= Portland spy ring =

Soviet spy ring that operated in England

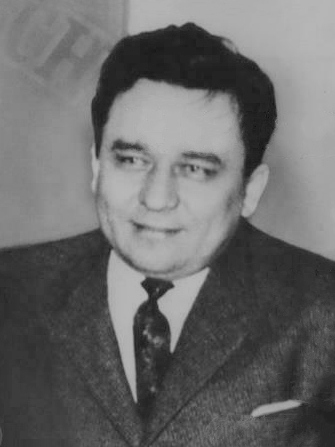
Konon Molody, who used the cover name Gordon Lonsdale, in 1961

The Portland spy ring was an espionage group active in the UK between 1953 and 1961. It comprised five people who obtained classified research documents from the Admiralty Underwater Weapons Establishment (AUWE) on the Isle of Portland, Dorset, and passed them to the Soviet Union.

Two of the group's members, Harry Houghton and Ethel Gee, were British. They worked at the AUWE and had access to the areas where the research was stored. After they obtained the information it was passed to their handler, Konon Molody—who was acting under the name Gordon Lonsdale. He was a KGB agent acting in the UK under a Canadian passport. Lonsdale would pass the documents in microdot format to Lona and Morris Cohen, two American communists who had moved to the UK using New Zealand passports in the names Helen and Peter Kroger. The Krogers would get the information to Moscow, often by using the cover of an antiquarian book dealer.

The ring was exposed in 1960 following a tip-off from the Polish spy Michael Goleniewski about a mole in the Admiralty. The information he supplied was enough to identify Houghton. Surveillance by MI5—the UK's domestic counter-intelligence service—established the connection between Houghton and Gee, and then between them and Lonsdale and finally the Krogers. All five were arrested in January 1961 and put on trial that March. Sentences for the group ranged from fifteen years (for Houghton and Gee) to twenty years (for the Krogers) to twenty-five years (for Lonsdale).

Lonsdale was released in 1964 in a spy swap for the British businessman Greville Wynne. The Krogers were exchanged in October 1969 as part of a swap with Gerald Brooke, a British national held on largely falsified claims. The last to be freed were Houghton and Gee, who were given early release in May 1970.

== Background ==
=== HMS Osprey and the Admiralty Underwater Weapons Establishment ===
Map of Admiralty facilities on the Isle of Portland, Dorset

By the late 1950s British military underwater research and development had established itself on the Isle of Portland, Dorset. A series of amalgamations of specialist units took place in 1959 and 1960; one of these comprised the merger of the Underwater Weapons Establishment and the Underwater Countermeasures & Weapons Establishment to form the Admiralty Underwater Weapons Establishment (AUWE). (Note: Previous amalgamations meant the Admiralty Underwater Weapons Establishment contained the former units the Underwater Launching Establishment, the Torpedo Experimental Establishment, the Underwater Countermeasures and Weapons Establishment and the Underwater Detection Establishment.)

Much of the development work for HMS Dreadnought (S101) was undertaken on Portland in the 1950s. Dreadnought, launched in 1960, was the UK's first nuclear-powered submarine. It contained a type 2001 sonar, described by the naval historian Iain Ballantyne as "immensely powerful", because the nuclear power from the reactor could "detect threats using active sonar at unprecedented ranges for both ships and submarines". During that time, researchers at the AUWE were refining the stealth capacity of submarines, and developing a new generation of submarines to be armed with nuclear ballistic missiles.

HMS Osprey was an anti-submarine training establishment located at the northern end of Portland. The base researched and developed methods and equipment for submarine detection. From 1957 onwards anti-submarine helicopter units also used Osprey as a training base.

=== Konon Molody (Gordon Lonsdale; 1922–1970) ===
Konon Trofimovich Molody (Russian: Ко́нон Трофи́мович Моло́дый) was a Soviet intelligence officer. He was educated in the US from the age of seven, spending nine years in the country, before returning to Russia in 1938. He was recruited by the NKVD (a forerunner of the KGB) in 1940 and in 1949 he joined the political intelligence wing and trained as an illegal agent—a spy working undercover in a foreign territory with no diplomatic immunity. (Note: The journalist Raymond Palmer states that Molody was recruited by the GRU, the Russian military intelligence organisation.) He was given the identity of the Canadian national Gordon Lonsdale and in 1954 he travelled from Russia to Canada, where he worked as a salesman. (Note: "Gordon Lonsdale" was a real person who was born in Canada in 1927 and died in Finland in the early 1940s. The KGB had taken possession of Finnish public records at the end of the war and recycled the names for their agents.) In February 1955 he crossed into the United States where he contacted his fellow agent Rudolf Abel and then sailed to Britain. He enrolled at the School of Oriental & African Studies for a course in Chinese. As a cover for his role as an agent, in 1956 he became the export director of a business that leased jukeboxes and vending machines. As export director he undertook visits to the European mainland, travelling as far as Poland on one visit. He was able to meet KGB officers when abroad.

=== Lona and Morris Cohen (Helen and Peter Kroger; 1913–1992 and 1910–1995) ===
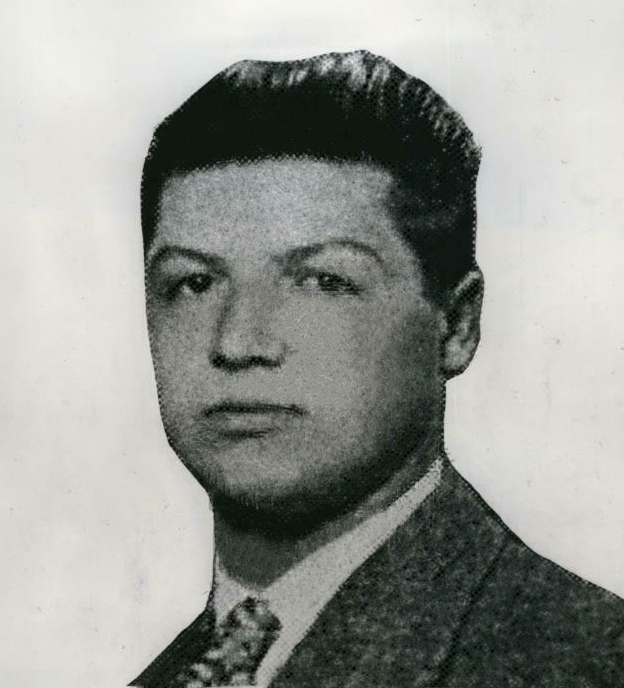
Morris Cohen in the 1930s

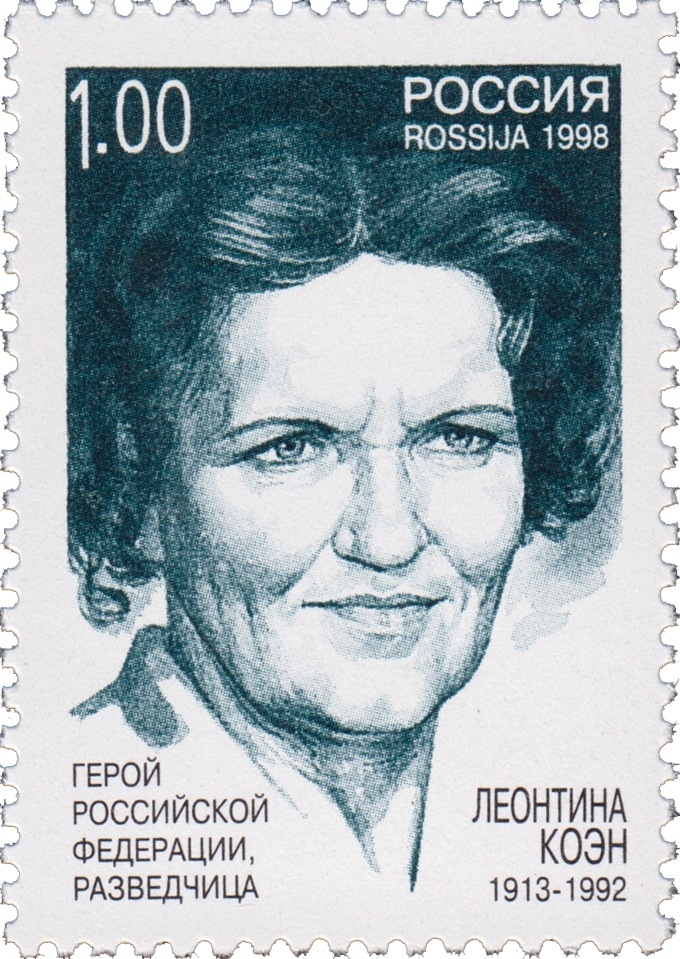
Lona Cohen, on a 1998 Russian stamp

Lona and Morris Cohen were American communists. Morris fought in the International Brigades during the Spanish Civil War; after he had been wounded in the legs, he was recruited into Soviet intelligence, possibly by the NKVD colonel Alexander Orlov. He returned to the US in November 1938. He met Lona (née Petka) and they married in July 1941; at the time she did not know Morris was a Soviet agent, but he told her soon after their wedding. Lona worked as a courier, transporting classified documents from Theodore Hall and Saville Sax at the Manhattan Project to the Soviet consulate in New York. One of the documents she carried was a complete diagram of the US atomic bomb. Information on the American weapon was in Moscow twelve days before the American test. Based on the intelligence provided, the USSR was able to test their first nuclear device four years later.

When the Venona decryption project began uncovering Russian spies acting in the US, the Cohens realised they were in danger of being uncovered and fled the country in June 1950, first to Moscow and then Poland. In 1954 they moved to Cranley Drive, Ruislip, just outside London, under the cover of two New Zealanders: Helen and Peter Kroger. Peter opened an antiquarian book business in the Strand, London. After settling into their new life, the Krogers made contact with Lonsdale. He assisted the couple when they dug out the rubble in the cellar under the kitchen to hide a radio transmitter to contact Moscow.

=== Harry Houghton (1905–1985) and Ethel Gee (1914–1984) ===
Harry Houghton was honourably discharged from the Royal Navy in 1945 as a master at arms and took a clerical job at HMS Osprey. He stayed there until 1951 when he joined the staff of the British embassy in Warsaw, Poland, as a pay clerk in the naval attaché's department. He was accompanied on his posting by his wife, Peggy. He met a Polish woman, Katarina, and soon fell in love and began having an affair; he was unaware that she was a member of the Polish intelligence services. He began partying and drinking heavily and running short of money as a result. Katarina suggested he begin trading coffee on the black market, and he began ordering goods from Britain to sell at inflated prices to the Poles. Marital relations declined and Houghton beat Peggy during their frequent rows, particularly when he was drunk. According to Peggy, Houghton threatened to kill her on several occasions, threw her over a wall on one occasion, burnt her with a cigarette and once attempted to push her off a cliff.

According to MI5 and the KGB Houghton made the first move in his recruitment, writing to the Polish Minister of Foreign Affairs in 1951, offering to provide secrets for money. When a Polish intelligence officer spoke to him, Houghton explained that he thought "Britain's present rulers had sold the country to the Americans and turned it into an American colony". He was given the codename Miron and began sending sensitive documents through to his handlers. In May 1952 he gave them 715 documents; in August it rose to 1,167, including details of a British spy in Murmansk and the structure of British Naval Intelligence. Houghton's drinking was causing concern at the embassy, and instead of spending three years in his role, he was sent back to the UK in October 1952, after fifteen months. He took a job at the AUWE on his return. In his autobiography, he claimed that he was blackmailed into spying only once he had returned to the UK, with threats against Katarina if he failed to help.

Ethel Gee—nicknamed Bunty—lived on Portland with her elderly mother, aunt and uncle. In October 1950, she became a filing clerk at the AUWE, where she handled top secret documents; she had access to areas where classified drawings of prototype or experimental projects were in progress. She was single, had no close friends and had been living a quiet life when she met Houghton in the early- to mid-1950s. In his memoirs, Houghton described Gee as "a woman in a million". What started as a friendship developed into an affair after Houghton explained that his marriage was breaking up.

== Spying activities ==
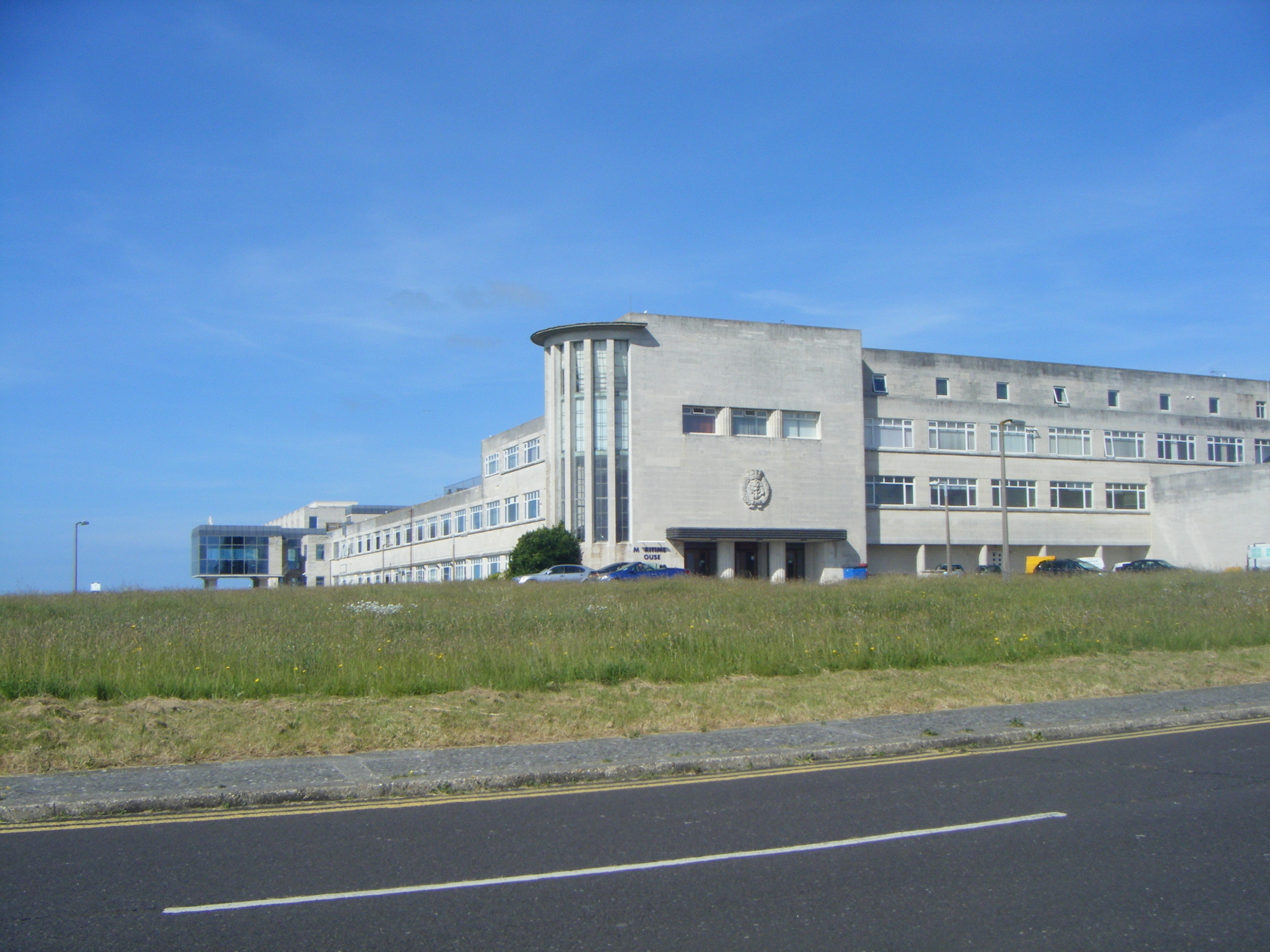
The former Admiralty Underwater Weapons Establishment on Portland

Soon after Houghton returned to Portland in 1953, he was contacted by Soviet intelligence to continue his spying. To copy the documents, he was given a Minox camera measuring 3 1/2 by 1 1/8 by 3/8 inch (88.9 mm × 28.6 mm × 9.5 mm) which he said "would easily pass as a cigarette lighter at a glance". Although he did not have access to sensitive information at first, he soon managed to access the sensitive records room by covering for staff over lunchtimes. He began providing documents to the Soviets at what MI5 describe as a "prolific" rate: 1,927 pages of documents in 1954 and 1,768 in 1955. These included details of mechanisms to conceal the noise of propellers and detect high-speed submarines, details of HMS Dreadnought and the navy's ship-building programme. Houghton had been instructed by Lonsdale not to tell Gee about his activities. At agreed points Houghton drove to pubs in the Kingston upon Thames area at weekends, taking camera film with naval documents. He was often asked for specific areas needed, such as homing torpedoes and submarine detection. Houghton was paid bonuses for the amount of information he passed over; in December 1955, he was given £500. His annual salary that year was £741. (Note: £500 in 1955 equates to approximately £11,000 in 2025 and £741 from the same year equates to approximately £16,900 in 2025, according to calculations based on the Consumer Price Index measure of inflation.) Houghton was profligate with his money. Despite a salary of less than £15 a week, he spent approximately £20 a week on drink in various local pubs, paid cash for a Renault Dauphine and £150 for a radiogram.

Before his marriage to Peggy broke up, Houghton made potentially serious errors that could have led to his being exposed as a spy. One evening he left a brown paper parcel on the bedroom table; his wife, thinking it could contain evidence of an affair, opened it and found a stack of Admiralty documents—all classified. He had also shown her a bundle of bank notes that she estimated was about £150. (Note: £150 in 1955 equates to approximately £3,000 in 2025, according to calculations based on the Consumer Price Index measure of inflation.) She was suspicious enough to raise the matter three times with the Admiralty in 1955. They contacted MI5 the following year, reporting that Houghton's wife had told them "her husband was divulging secret information to people who ought not to get it". The Admiralty—aware of the split between the couple—also advised "It is considered not impossible that the whole of these allegations may be nothing more than outpourings of a jealous and disgruntled wife", and that the claim was probably "made on the spur of the moment and out of pure spite". Although no investigation was undertaken into the accusations, in late 1956 Houghton was moved from AUWE to HMS Osprey, where there was less access to classified information.

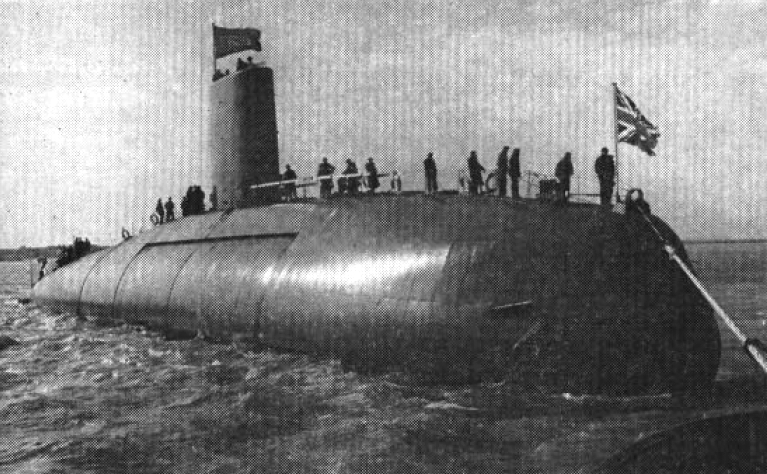
HMS Dreadnought after launch 1960

In 1956 Houghton's marriage broke up. His lack of access to documents meant he was receiving no bonuses from the Russians, and so he was short of cash. Gee lent him £200 to help to move out into a caravan which he purchased—he repaid her at a rate of £10 a month. (Note: £200 in 1956 equates to approximately £4,000 in 2025 and £10 from the same year equates to approximately £200 in 2025, according to calculations based on the Consumer Price Index measure of inflation.) Wanting to start earning his bonus payments again, Houghton suggested to Lonsdale that he inform Gee of his activities and use her to obtain the classified documents he no longer had access to. Gee had a higher security classification than Houghton, which was attractive to the Russians, and they agreed, although Houghton introduced Lonsdale to her as an American, Commander Alex Johnston. (Note: In his biography, Houghton blames Lonsdale for suggesting that Gee spied for him, forcing the situation "I won't say he turned ugly, but he certainly put the pressure on".) "Johnston" explained that he wanted to ensure that the UK were giving the US the information they were obliged to under their NATO commitments. He gave her details of what he was interested in and advised her on how to avoid internal security measures; among the information requested were details of the type 2001 sonar on HMS Dreadnought, and underwater detection equipment. Lonsdale had some regard for Gee and considered she "was certainly a better person than Houghton". He considered Houghton "the weakest link in the ring" and "a fool".

The documents gathered by Houghton and Gee were passed to Lonsdale, who then handed them on to the Krogers. They acted as the communications team who passed the information to Moscow. Some was via a radio—concealed beneath the kitchen floor and using a 75-foot-long (23 m) aerial hidden in the attic. Some research was also converted to microdots. These were inserted into the spines of books that Peter Kroger sent out from his book business to customers in Europe. He would then contact Moscow using a code generated by a one-time pad, (Note: A "one-time pad" is an encryption technique that uses a cipher on a disposable piece of paper that requires the reader to have the same piece of paper to decipher the message.) and send a fast "burst" transmission—of over 200 words a minute—alerting the KGB to what was being sent.

== Exposure and arrest ==
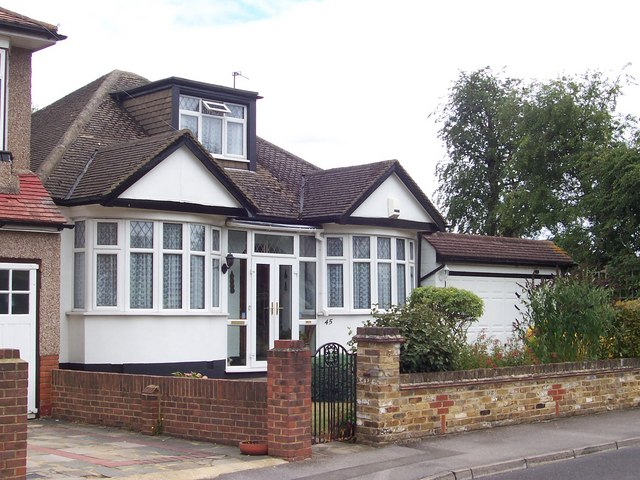
Lonsdale visited the Krogers regularly at their home in Ruislip.

In 1960 the Polish spy Michael Goleniewski told his handlers at the Central Intelligence Agency (CIA) that there was a Soviet spy working for the Royal Navy who had been in Warsaw in 1952 and who was called "Horton", or similar. The information was passed over to MI5 who soon identified Houghton. According to the MI5 officer Peter Wright the first reports were in 1959, but there was insufficient evidence to identify Houghton; it was only after a second report in March 1960, Wright says, that an identification could be made. The MI5 case officer was Charles Elwell, who later led the investigations for espionage into John Vassall and John Stonehouse.

During mid-1960 MI5's surveillance specialists—known as the watcher section—began observation of Houghton and Gee, paying particular attention during their monthly visits to London. On one such visit they noticed Houghton hand over a plastic carrier bag to another man, in exchange for an envelope. They followed the man back to his car and established it was owned by Lonsdale. He was put under full surveillance and soon after was seen visiting a branch of his bank, where he lodged a suitcase and a parcel in a safety deposit box.

The director general of MI5, Roger Hollis, contacted the chairman of the Midland Bank and arranged for the deposit box to be opened by MI5. On 5 September 1960 the contents were extracted from the box. Inside were found Minox and Praktica miniature cameras and a Ronson cigarette lighter set in a wooden bowl; this was x-rayed and found to contain one-time pads and map references. Everything was examined, photographed and replaced in Lonsdale's box. (Note: Molody's map references were to places in London where he could drop off messages for later retrieval—known in the spy trade as a dead letter drop.) Enquiries were made with the Royal Canadian Mounted Police into Lonsdale's background. They supplied MI5 with a copy of his passport. MI5 bugged his flat and decided he was an illegal—a member of a foreign government working in London under an operational cover. GCHQ, the British signals intelligence agency, were alerted every time Lonsdale used his radio and copied the messages he was sending to Moscow, deciphering them using copies of the one-time pads from the bank. In November 1960 MI5 tailed Lonsdale to the Kroger's house in Ruislip; they set up an observation post in the house opposite to monitor the couple.

On 2 January 1961 MI5 case officers decided—with the permission of the Admiralty—to watch the Portland spies for three more months, to see if Lonsdale was only dealing with Houghton, or if he was handling other spies. Two days later the CIA informed them that Goleniewski was going to defect the following day. Realising that a senior Polish intelligence operative coming to the West would likely warn the Soviets of the probable exposure of Houghton—and therefore the rest of the ring—MI5 decided to act at the next scheduled meeting, 7 January, but that they would closely monitor Lonsdale for any warnings from Moscow.

That Saturday, 7 January, Houghton and Gee travelled to London by train—MI5 watchers and Special Branch detectives following them throughout the journey. MI5 have no powers of arrest and need to work with the police—normally Special Branch—when arrests are needed. After some shopping, the pair went to the Old Vic theatre where they met Lonsdale. As soon as the three were together, the police and MI5 stepped in and arrested them. In Gee's bag, police found copies of 4 confidential AUWE files and undeveloped film that was later found to contain 310 photographs of research on HMS Dreadnought and Admiralty orders. Police and MI5 search teams entered the premises of Houghton, Gee and Lonsdale where they found further incriminating evidence, including miniature cameras, large amounts of money, cypher pads, material to make microdots and more classified information.

Three Flowers talcum powder tin, with hidden compartments

The Krogers were arrested that evening. As they were preparing to leave the house to go into custody, Helen picked up her handbag and asked the police for permission to stoke the fire; suspicious, a police officer denied permission and took the handbag from her. It was later shown to hold communication in microdot form between Lonsdale and Moscow. Police and MI5 searchers took more than a week to fully search the house. Among the finds were New Zealand passports in the names of Helen and Peter Kroger, a tin of talcum powder, with hollow compartments, one of which held a microdot reader, a battery with a removable top, containing US$6,000, and the radio transmitter concealed beneath the kitchen floor. (Note: $6,000 in 1960 equates to approximately equivalent to $65,000 in 2025, based on changes in the consumer price index.) Police found a match for the Krogers' fingerprints in Scotland Yard's archives. They matched those sent over by the Federal Bureau of Investigation in 1958, identifying them as the wanted Soviet spies Lona and Morris Cohen.

== Trial ==
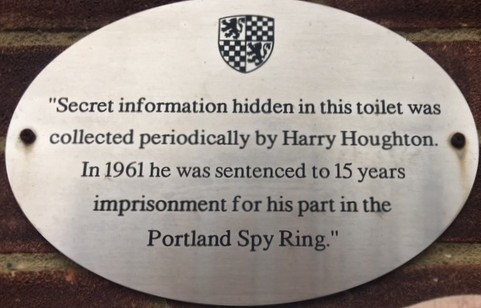
Plaque at a public toilets in Alresford, Hampshire

The hearings at the Bow Street Magistrates' Court opened on 7 February 1961; the court had been altered for the occasion, and temporary raised benches had been installed to accommodate the many journalists who wanted to attend. Leading for the prosecution was the attorney general, Reginald Manningham-Buller, whose opening statement lasted two hours, during which he gave details of the spy ring, how it worked and the equipment they used to encode and transmit the information to Moscow. The hearing finished on 10 February with all five accused committed for trial; bail was refused.

The case against the five spies began on 13 March 1961 at the Old Bailey; the lord chief justice, Lord Parker presided. All five defendants were charged with "conspiracy to communicate information in contravention of Section 1 of the Official Secrets Act 1911". Houghton later wrote in his biography that "The testimony I gave at the Old Bailey was pretty meaningless. I didn't dare tell the true story of the Portland Spy Ring in the witness-box: it had to be tailored down to the best advantage". The journalist Trevor Barnes, in his history of the Portland spy ring, describes Gee's evidence as an "unconvincing narrative ... riddled with lies". The case lasted until 22 March. The jury found all five defendants guilty in less than ninety minutes. Lonsdale was sentenced to twenty five years in prison; the Krogers received twenty years. Houghton and Gee were both sentenced for fifteen years.

== Aftermath ==
The leaders of the government when the Portland spies were uncovered

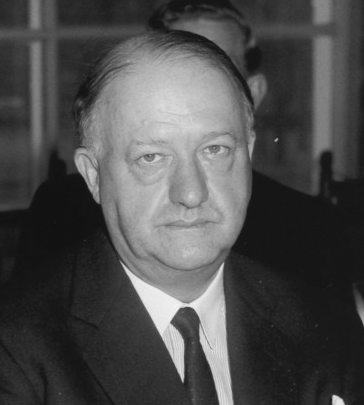
Rab Butler, the Home Secretary, in 1963

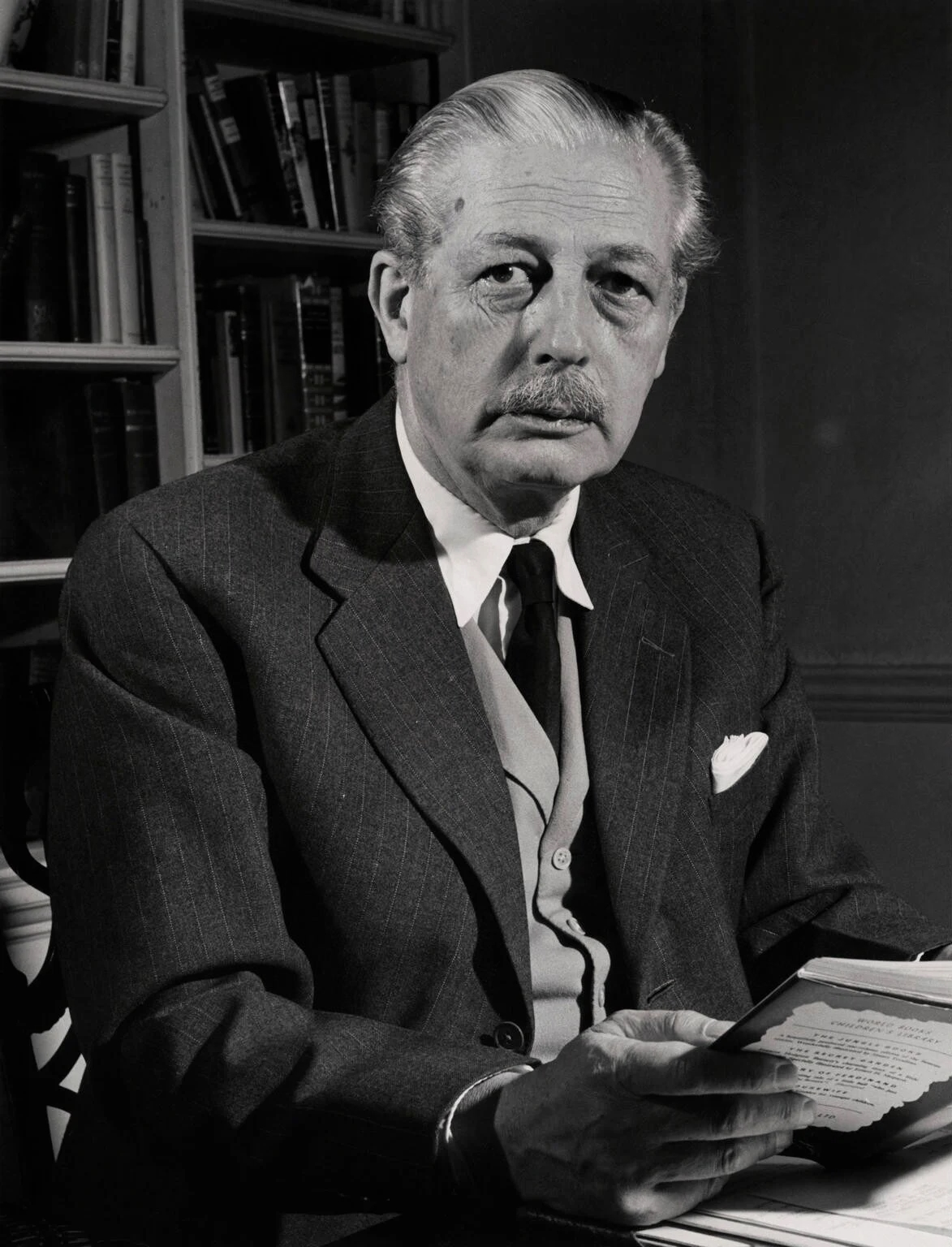
Harold Macmillan, the Prime Minister, in 1959

At the end of March 1961 Rab Butler, the Home Secretary, announced the formation of a committee of inquiry under Sir Charles Romer, the former Lord Justice of Appeal. The inquiry was "[T]o examine the circumstances connected with the recent spy trial at the Central Criminal Court and, in particular, those in which two individuals came to be employed, and were retained in employment, in naval establishments, with a view to determining what breaches of security arrangements, if any, took place".

According to the journalists David Wise and Thomas B. Ross the setting up of the committee "seemed to be the end of the security scare". A month after the Romer Inquiry opened, however, the MI6 officer George Blake was arrested and charged with espionage. The prime minister, Harold Macmillan, described it as "a new blow", and came to an agreement with Hugh Gaitskell—the leader of the Labour Party and leader of the opposition—that the Romer committee should complete its inquiry and pass on its recommendations to a new inquiry under the chairmanship of Lord Radcliffe which was to look at security procedures and practices in a wider context.

The Romer Committee sat as an administrative, rather than a legal body, meaning no witnesses were accompanied by legal representatives. Evidence was heard from over twenty witnesses, including senior members of MI5, the Admiralty, Naval Intelligence and GCHQ. Hollis criticised the security arrangements at AUWE, where it was common practice to allow senior staff to take classified information off the premises to work on them overnight. Elwell wrote a preliminary report he presented to the committee, in which he described Lonsdale as "a man of considerable charm ... humorous and ironical, rather than witty, ready to talk fluently and trenchantly on most subjects". His views on the Krogers were more damning: he described Peter as "a sententious bore ... a man whose life appears to be governed by rancid idealism" and Helen as "even less alluring ... she looks and probably behaves like an embittered crazy fanatic".

Romer's inquiry reported in June 1961. Its conclusions were read out in parliament by Macmillan. After making four points regarding Houghton and Gee's employment on Portland, he continued:

5. In 1956 Houghton was twice brought to the notice of the authorities in the Underwater Detection Establishment as a probable security risk. Insufficient investigations were made and a report which was both incomplete and misleading was submitted to the Admiralty. The Security Officer at the Establishment is gravely to blame for the casual way in which he dealt with this matter. Even so, the Captain of the Establishment should personally have ensured that proper inquiries were conducted and that the matter was fully reported to the Admiralty.

6. The main responsibility for the failure to make a proper investigation of Houghton in 1956 rests, therefore, with the authorities in the Underwater Detection Establishment at that time. The evidence discloses that there was a general want of "security mindedness" in the Establishment and responsibility for this must rest with the Captain of the Establishment. But the Admiralty, and the Security Service, although they received only an incomplete and misleading report from Portland, cannot escape criticism for failing to press the matter to a positive conclusion.

The Conservative MP Donald Johnson observed that Romer "did not pull his punches in his comments and did not allow himself to be one of the 'whitewash' brigade".

== Later developments ==
=== Lonsdale ===
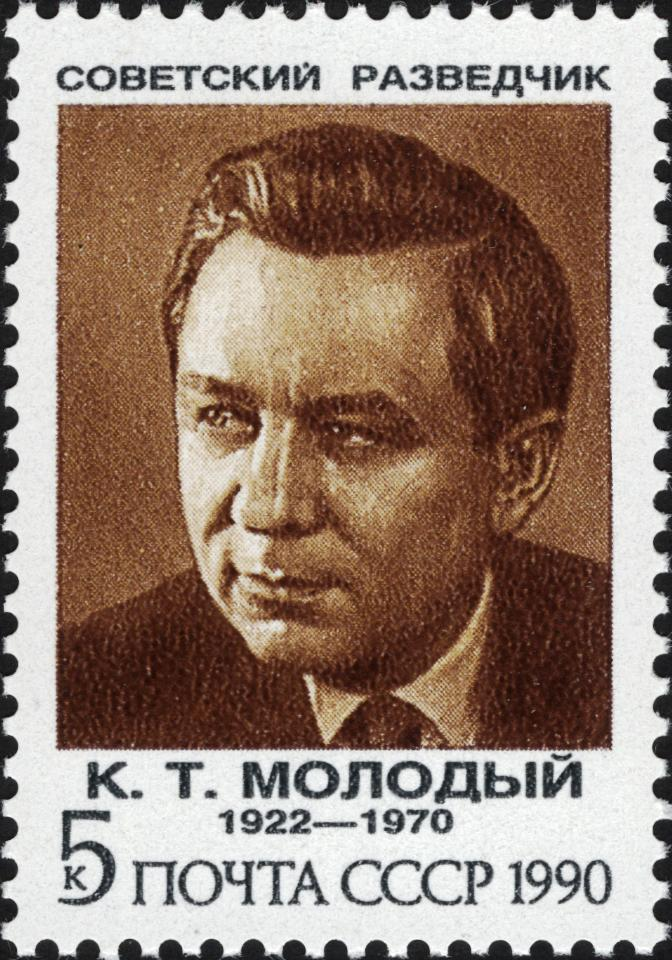
Lonsdale on a 1990 Soviet stamp

In November 1962 the British businessman Greville Wynne was arrested in Budapest, Hungary, on espionage charges. He had been a courier for information from Oleg Penkovsky, a colonel in the GRU, the Soviet Union's military intelligence organization. Wynne was the subject of a show trial in Moscow in May 1963 and sentenced to eight years in prison; Penkovsky received the death sentence. Wynne was treated badly in prison and his health deteriorated rapidly (he had already lost 2 stone (28 lb; 13 kg) by mid-1963). Soviet overtures on a spy swap were discussed in secret by the British government and on 21 April 1964 Lonsdale was removed from Winson Green prison in Birmingham, flown to West Germany and exchanged for Wynne.

In 1965 Lonsdale published his biography Spy, ghost-written by Kim Philby, who had defected to the Soviets the previous year. Barnes notes that "the book contains many lies", and the historian Christopher Andrew described them as "misleading memoirs" that "contained a variety of disinformation—including the pretence that the 'Krogers' were entirely innocent".

Lonsdale died in October 1970 while on a picnic with his family; after his second glass of vodka, he had a stroke and died within a few days. He was honoured by the Soviet government in 1990 by appearing on a stamp.

=== Krogers ===
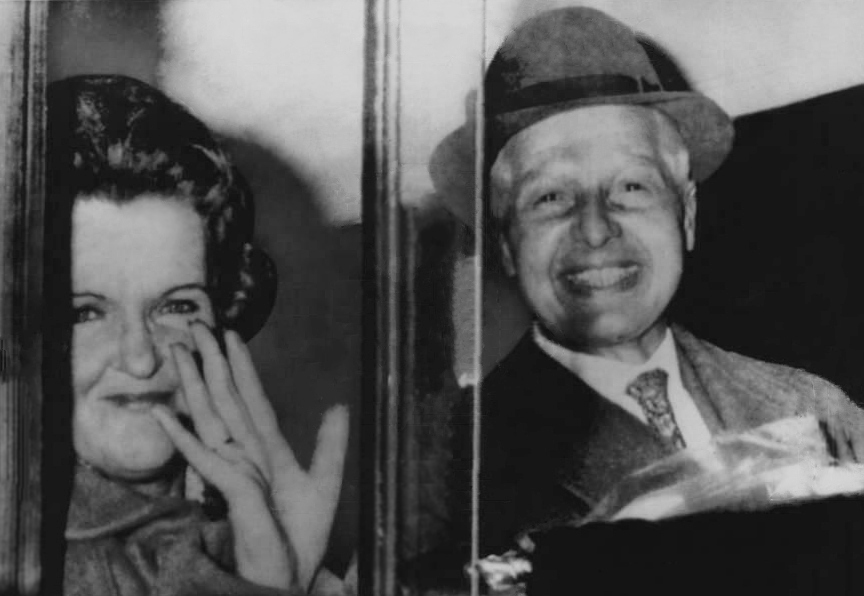
The Krogers, on their way from prison to Moscow, 1969

The Krogers were released in October 1969 as part of an exchange with Gerald Brooke. Brooke had been arrested in April 1965 on espionage charges. He was not a spy, nor had he been engaged in espionage but, as a deeply religious man, he had worked with an émigré group that had been critical of the Soviet government. He had been sentenced to five years in prison, but after four years was in poor and worsening health. Under threat of an extended sentence on additional—and falsified—charges, a compromise was reached between the British and Soviet governments, whereby he was released three months before the Krogers.

A dinner was held for the Krogers at a KGB dacha in November 1969, attended by Yuri Andropov, the chairman of the KGB, who presented them the Order of the Red Banner. Under Boris Yeltsin's government, they were named heroes of the Russian Federation. Helen died in December 1992; Peter in June 1995. They were both buried in the KGB's Novokuntsevo Cemetery. The couple were honoured by the Russian government by appearing on stamps in 1998.

=== Houghton and Gee ===
Houghton and Gee were allowed to write to each other in prison—an act ordinarily not allowed—as MI5 wished to see if there were any indiscretions in their correspondence. Houghton spent a few months at Wormwood Scrubs before being transferred to Winchester. Gee spent much of her time in HM Prison Styal, an open prison in Cheshire.

Although Houghton and Gee received the shortest prison sentences of any of the Portland spy ring, they spent the longest time incarcerated; they were released on the same day in May 1970. Gee moved back to her old house on Portland; Houghton to a flat on the outskirts of Poole, Dorset. The two began seeing each other again, although they had to avoid the press constantly. They married in April 1971.

Houghton wrote Operation Portland in 1972; Barnes notes numerous inaccuracies in the book and described it as a "tiresome volume ... a book-length whine of complaint about the alleged incompetence of the Security Service, the unfairness of his trial and his harsh treatment in prison". Gee died in 1984; Houghton in 1985.

== Legacy ==
In addition to news and historical coverage, the Portland Spy Ring and its aftermath have been described in books, including histories of what happened, personal memoirs from those involved and on stage and screen. (Note: These include: Ring of Spies (1964) a film with Bernard Lee and William Sylvester; Act of Betrayal (1971) The BBC One Play of the Month by Hugh Whitemore; Pack of Lies (1983), Whitemore adapted his television play for the stage; A Pack of Lies was remade by CBS in 1987, with Teri Garr, Alan Bates and Ellen Burstyn; Whitemore's play was also broadcast on BBC Radio 4 as Betrayal – Pack of Lies on the Saturday Play series on 9 September 2006, with Alfred Molina, Michael York and Ed Begley Jr.)

In 2019 many of the papers relating to the Portland spy ring were released by The National Archives; many files had previously been released in November 2017. The papers contained a comment from the former director general of MI5, Martin Furnival Jones, highlighting the correspondence from Houghton's ex-wife:

It is clear that we ought to have carried out some investigation in 1956. If we had done so there is a fair chance that we would have unearthed Houghton's espionage and the probability is that we would have discovered that he was being controlled as a spy by a member of the Soviet embassy. We might also have hit upon Miss Gee. If we had done so we should have stopped a leakage of information from the Admiralty some four years earlier.

== Notes and references ==
=== Sources ===
==== Books ====
- Andrew, Christopher M. (2000). The Sword and the Shield: the Mitrokhin Archive and the Secret History of the KGB. New York: Basic Books. ISBN 978-0-4650-0312-9.
- Ballantyne, Iain (2013). Hunter Killers. London: Orion. ISBN 978-1-4091-4418-2.
- Barnes, Trevor (2021). Dead Doubles: The Extraordinary Worldwide Hunt for one of the Cold War's Most Notorious Spy Rings. London: Weidenfeld & Nicolson. ISBN 978-1-4746-0911-1.
- Beaver, Paul (1982). Encyclopaedia of the Modern Royal Navy: Including the Fleet Air Arm & Royal Marines. Annapolis, Maryland: Naval Institute Press. ISBN 978-0-8702-1830-9.
- Bulloch, John; Miller, Henry (1961). Spy Ring: The Full Story of the Naval Secrets Case. London: Martin Secker & Warburg. OCLC 1926529.
- Carr, Barnes (2016). Operation Whisper: The Capture of Soviet Spies Morris and Lona Cohen. Lebanon, New Hampshire: The University Press of New England. ISBN 978-1-61168-809-2.
- Chalk, Peter; Rosenau, William (2004). Confronting "the Enemy Within": Security Intelligence, the Police and Counterterrorism in Four Democracies. Santa Monica, California: RAND Corp. ISBN 978-0-8330-3513-4.
- Costello, John; Tsarev, Oleg (1993). Deadly Illusions. New York: Crown. ISBN 978-0-517-58850-5.
- Ewing, Keith; Mahoney, Joan; Moretta, Andrew (2019). MI5, the Cold War, and the Rule of Law. Oxford: Oxford University Press. ISBN 978-0-1988-1862-5.
- Hayes, Julian (2021). Stonehouse: Cabinet Minister, Fraudster, Spy. London: Robinson. ISBN 978-1-4721-4654-0.
- Houghton, Harry (1972). Operation Portland: The Autobiography of a Spy. London: Hart-Davis. ISBN 978-0-246-10548-6.
- Johnson, Donald (1967). A Cassandra at Westminster. London: Johnson Publishing. OCLC 955116.
- Keily, Jackie; Hoffbrand, Julia (2015). The Crime Museum Uncovered. London: IB Tauris. ISBN 978-1-78130-041-1.
- Lonsdale, Gordon (1965). Spy. Twenty Years in Soviet Secret Service: The Memoirs of Gordon Lonsdale. New York: Hawthorn Books. OCLC 1097468571.
- Loughton, Anthony; Deacon, Margaret (2010). "The Founding Director, Sir George Deacon". In Gould, John; Laughton, Anthony; Roe, Howard; Tucker, Tom (eds.). Of Seas and Ships and Scientists: The Remarkable History of the UK's National Institute of Oceanography, 1949–1973. Cambridge: The Lutterworth Press. pp. 33–40. ISBN 978-0-7188-9703-1.
- Lucas, Norman (1973). Spycatcher: A Biography of Detective-Superintendent George Gordon Smith. London: W. H. Allen. ISBN 978-0-491-00624-8.
- Maclean, Fitzroy (1978). "One for the Ladies". Take Nine Spies. New York: Atheneum. pp. 278–303. ISBN 978-0-6891-0854-9.
- Macmillan, Harold (1973). At the End of the Day, 1961–1963. New York: Harper & Row. ISBN 978-0-0601-2783-1.
- Mitrokhin, Vasili (11 January 2013). KGB Lexicon: The Soviet Intelligence Officers Handbook. London: Routledge. ISBN 978-1-1363-4344-5.
- Palmer, Raymond (1977). The Making of a Spy. New York: Crescent Books. ISBN 978-0-517-21868-6.
- Shipley, Peter (1990). Hostile Action: The KGB and Secret Soviet Operations in Britain. New York: St Martin's Press. ISBN 978-0-312-04120-5.
- Smith, W. Thomas (2003). Encyclopedia of the Central Intelligence Agency. New York: Infobase Publishing. ISBN 978-1-4381-3018-7.
- Speller, Ian (2005). "Amphibious Operations 1945–1998". In Harding, Richard (ed.). The Royal Navy, 1930-2000: Innovation and Defence. London: Frank Cass. pp. 213–245. ISBN 978-0-7146-5710-3.
- Trevor-Roper, Hugh (2014). The Secret World: Behind the Curtain of British Intelligence in World War II and the Cold War. London: I.B. Tauris. ISBN 978-0-8577-3703-8.
- West, Nigel (1984). The Circus: MI5 Operations 1945–1972. New York: Stein and Day. ISBN 978-0-8128-8071-7.
- West, Rebecca (1982). The Meaning of Treason. London: Virago. ISBN 978-0-86068-256-1.
- Wise, David; Ross, Thomas B. (1967). The Espionage Establishment. New York: Random House. OCLC 1647771.
- Wright, Peter; Greengrass, Paul (1987). Spycatcher. Richmond, Victoria: William Heinemann Australia. ISBN 978-0-85561-098-2.

==== News ====
- Berg, Sanchia (24 September 2019). "MI5 ignored Cold War spy tip-off over 'jealous wife' fears". BBC News.
- Coveney, Michael (18 July 2018). "Hugh Whitemore obituary". The Guardian.
- Dowd, Vincent (11 November 2014). "The spies in a suburban bungalow". BBC News.
- "Little suburban house was communication centre for spy ring, Crown alleges". The Times. 8 February 1961. p. 5.
- Macintyre, Ben (24 September 2019). "Portland spies undone by a giant lighter". The Times.
- "Morris Cohen, 84, Soviet spy who passed atom plans in 40's". The New York Times. 5 July 1995. p. 9.
- "Objection to 12 jurors at Secrets Act trial". The Times. 14 March 1961. p. 4.
- O'Connor, John J. (24 April 1987). "TV weekend; friends and spies in 'A Pack of Lies'". The New York Times. p. 30.
- "Official secrets trial: Lonsdale, "master mind", gets 25 years". The Times. 23 March 1961. p. 6.
- "Red spy's tale". The Times. 28 October 1965. p. 17.
- Siddique, Haroon (23 September 2019). "Portland spy ring 'could have been stopped four years earlier', files say". The Guardian.
- Womack, Helen (14 August 1998). "At last, the truth emerges about Gordon Lonsdale's shadowy life". The Independent.

==== Magazines, journals and internet sites ====
- "Admiralty and Ministry of Defence: Underwater Weapons Establishment, later Admiralty Underwater Weapons Establishment". The National Archives.
- Clark, Gregory (2023). "The Annual RPI and Average Earnings for Britain, 1209 to Present (New Series)". MeasuringWorth.
- "Consumer Price Index, 1800–". Federal Reserve Bank of Minneapolis.
- Dalziel, Stephen (7 January 2020). "The Krogers' Radio Transmitter". Science Museum.
- "DSTL's History" (PDF). The Defence Science and Technology Laboratory. Archived from the original (PDF) on 15 March 2022.
- Foot, M. R. D. (2004). "Wynne, Greville Maynard". Oxford Dictionary of National Biography (online ed.). Oxford University Press. doi:10.1093/ref:odnb/40700. (Subscription, Wikipedia Library access or UK public library membership required.)
- "Latest MI5 files released". The National Archives. 24 September 2019.
- "Play of the Month: Act of Betrayal". Radio Times. 2 January 1971. p. 26.
- "Portland spy ring". MI5.
- "Ring of Spies". British Film Institute. Archived from the original on 14 January 2009.
- "The Saturday Play: Betrayal – Pack of Lies". Radio Times. 9 September 2006. Archived from the original on 22 January 2023.
- "September 2019 release of historical MI5 files". MI5. 24 September 2019.
- Smith Holmes, Marian (19 April 2009). "Spies Who Spilled Atomic Bomb Secrets". Smithsonian Magazine.
- Walton, Calder (27 November 2017). "The Unbelievable Story of How the CIA Helped Foil a Russian Spy Ring in London". Politico Magazine.

==== Hansard ====
- Butler, Rab, Home Secretary (29 March 1961). "Security Procedures (Committee Of Inquiry)". Parliamentary Debates (Hansard). House of Commons. col. 1345–1346.
- Macmillan, Harold, Prime Minister (13 June 1961). "Underwater Detection Establishment, Portland (Committee's Report)". Parliamentary Debates (Hansard). House of Commons. col. 212–217.
