= Konon Molody =

KGB officer (1922–1970)

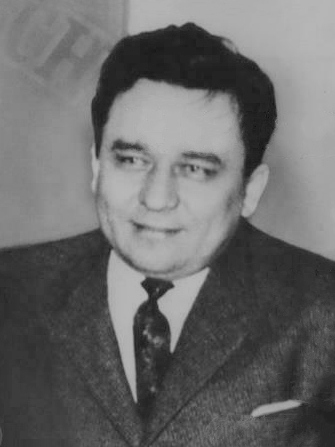
- Molody c. 1961
- Born: 17 January 1922; Moscow, Russian SFSR
- Died: 11 October 1970 (aged 48); Medynsky District, Russian SFSR, Soviet Union
- Other name: Gordon Arnold Lonsdale
- Occupation: Spy
- Awards: Order of the Red Banner; Order of the Patriotic War; Order of the Red Star

Konon Trofimovich Molody (Russian: Ко́нон Трофи́мович Моло́дый; 17 January 1922 – 11 October 1970) was a Soviet intelligence officer, known in the West as Gordon Arnold Lonsdale. Posing as a Canadian businessman during the Cold War, he was a non-official (illegal) KGB intelligence agent and the mastermind of the Portland spy ring, which operated in Britain from 1953 until 1961.

== Gordon Lonsdale identity ==
A person by the name of Gordon Arnold Lonsdale was born on 27 August 1924 in Cobalt, Ontario, Canada. His father Emmanuel Jack Lonsdale was a miner. His mother Olga Elina Bousa had emigrated from Finland. The Lonsdales separated in 1931. A year later, Olga took her eight-year-old son with her back to her native Finland. He is believed to have died c. 1943 and the Soviets obtained his papers for use by their agents. The actual Gordon Lonsdale was recorded as having been circumcised; the impostor was not.

== Molody's early life ==
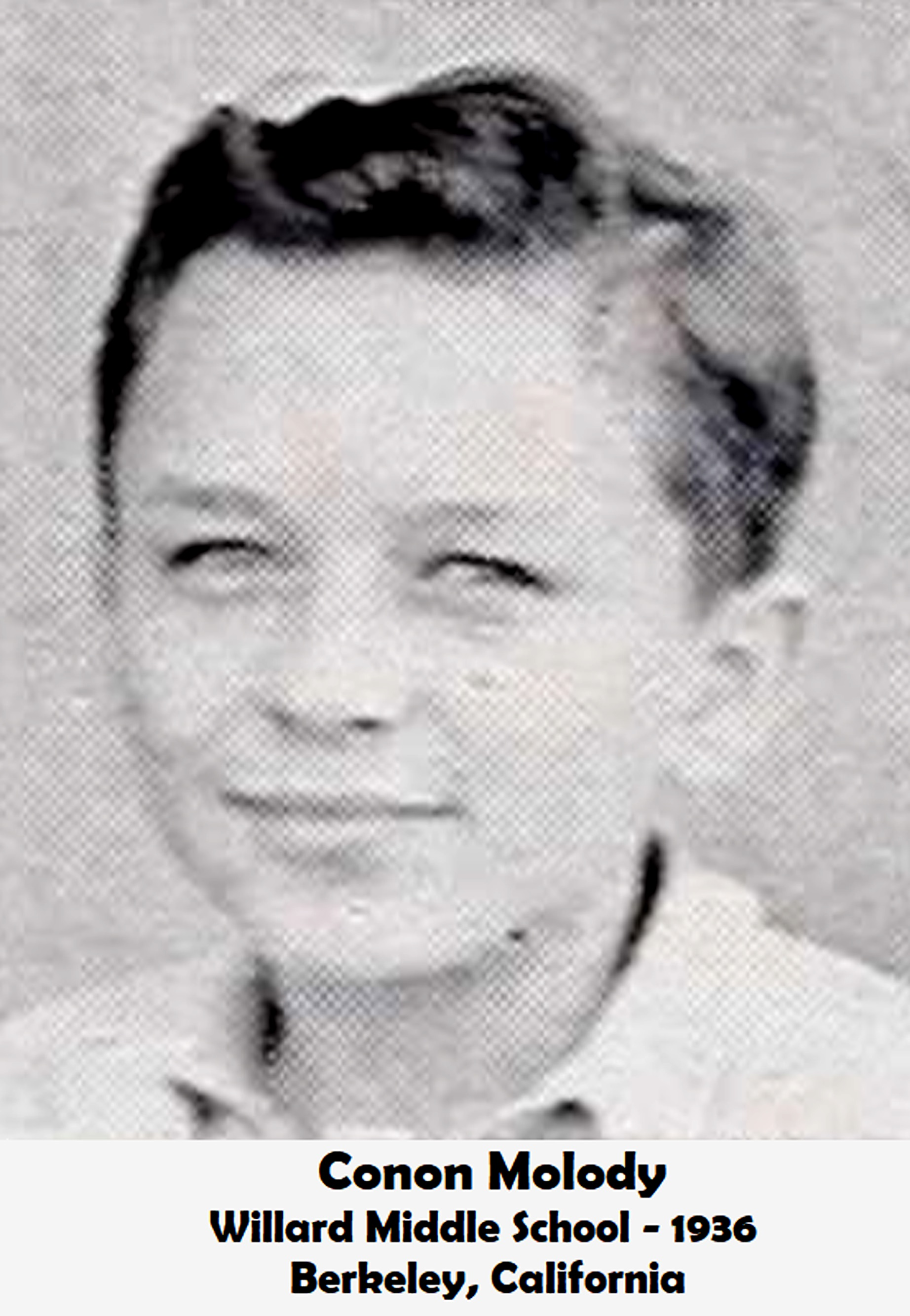
Molody in 1936

Konon Molody was born in Moscow in 1922, the son of a scientist and his wife. His paternal grandparents were a Ukrainian man exiled to Kamchatka and an Even woman. Konon's father, Trofim Kononovich Molody became a renowned physicist in Russia (born 1889) who studied in Khabarovsk, St. Petersburg and Moscow. His father died when he was a child. According to Konon's son, Trofim Molody, who wrote a book about his father, Soviet intelligence already had their eyes on the young boy. In 1934 the NKVD chief Genrikh Yagoda helped Konon's mother get a foreign passport for him to leave for the US to study in California and live there with his aunt, dance teacher Tatiana Piankova. Between 1936 and 1938 he was enrolled at the A to Z junior high school in Berkeley. According to his official SVR biography, he left the USSR in 1932. He returned to the Soviet Union in 1938, having learned English and gained familiarity with American culture.

== Beginnings in intelligence work: the GRU ==
In October 1940, Molody became a Red Army conscript and soldier. Later, he evinced a strong capacity to learn quickly and to master new tasks and assignments prodigiously. He also proved adept at mastering foreign languages in a short period of time. Therefore, he was quickly re-assigned as a reconnaissance and military intelligence officer by autumn 1940. As a military intelligence officer, he served in the GRU (Soviet Military Intelligence). In Molody's biography of himself as the KGB illegal, Gordon Lonsdale (Spy: Twenty Years of Secret Service), he narrates the "legend" that he was from a Polish family from Lvov (Lviv) and two years younger than he really was (that is, Lonsdale was two years younger than Molody in the "legend" or backstory). Lonsdale in the "legend" had first arrived in Warsaw in the summer of 1939. He begins to work with a Polish underground resistance group and obtains papers as a Volksdeutscher. Lonsdale continues to describe the situation in Warsaw which after September 1939 was conquered and divided between the Soviets and Nazi Germany. Germany held Warsaw. All the while, Lonsdale (Molody) was learning and practicing his Polish and German from summer 1939 to summer 1940. Ostensibly he was part of the Polish underground movement (the backstory), but in reality this time period and training was part of his language training as a GRU intelligence officer. Molody (as Lonsdale) was also receiving training using passwords, dead drops, safehouses and learned how to escape a surveillance tail from enemy intelligence agents. Sometime in late 1940 or early 1941, Molody (as Lonsdale) began his work as a Volksdeutscher inside a German Organization Todt. Todt was in charge of building civil infrastructure (bridges, roads, railways) in Lvov.

The next part of his GRU work during WWII was spent with the renowned William Fisher (the famous illegal better known by his U.S. identity of Colonel Abel). In late 1939, Molody found himself in a hospital in Moscow where he began a short course in intelligence work. He was also given a course in radio communication that is, how to work as a radio operator, coding and decoding radio messages. In January 1940, Molody was parachuted surreptitiously in Belarus near Minsk. In 1943, he was unexpectedly picked up by the Abwehr (German intelligence) for having some discrepancy with his papers. He was soon interrogated by an Abwehr intelligence officer who turned out to be William Fisher. Fisher incredibly was a Soviet intelligence agent who managed to infiltrate German intelligence, that is, the Abwehr. Fisher's cover was named Alec. Alec selected Molody for an Abwehr operation behind Soviet lines. During the medical examination of Molody, Alec (Fisher) found a medical problem with Molody, noted it in the file and then released Molody. Thereafter, Molody served as Fisher's radio operator for Soviet intelligence. Fisher continued to serve in the Abwehr and through Molody sent information back to the Soviets about the Abwehr's agents behind Soviet lines. Molody noted that Fisher's coordinates for the Abwehr agents dropped behind Soviet lines were quite precise. Soviet forces were able to capture the German agents quickly. Molody wrote of Fisher (in the Lonsdale memoir), "This was my first introduction to one of the most remarkable men I have ever met in my life, who is also indeed one of the most astute intelligence officers of all time." Sometime in early 1944, Molody and Fisher's assignment in Minsk ended.

After the end of the war, from 1946 Molody enrolled as a war veteran into the Trade Law Department of the prestigious Institute of Foreign Trade, where he mastered the Chinese language.

== Career as a Soviet "illegal" in the INO (Foreign Department) of the MGB ==
In 1951 Molody was recruited by the MGB First Chief Directorate (Political intelligence wing) and trained as a MGB "illegal agent" (NOC) on foreign soil. During his intelligence training he married and had two children. In 1953, Molody travelled to Canada on a Soviet merchant ship, posing as a Canadian national named "Gordon Lonsdale" (the true Lonsdale having died in Finland in the early 1940s). The MGB foreign branch had taken possession of Finnish public records after the war and had frequently used them to establish new spy identities. From Canada, "Gordon Lonsdale" illegally travelled without a visa to the US, where he started his operations as an aid to atomic spy Rudolph Abel. He also first met the American communist couple Morris and Lona Cohen (UK cover names Peter and Helen Kroger).

In 1954, Konon Molody moved to London, where as a Canadian citizen he enrolled at the London University School of Oriental and African Studies and again studied Chinese. He had numerous female friends in London and Europe. Using business as a cover, Molody headed a London KGB front company manufacturing and trading in jukeboxes, bubble-gum and gambling machines. He may have recruited other agents and set up dead letter boxes while on his business trips to West Europe. Once a year he would spend time in Prague or Warsaw with his Russian wife Galina. She was led by the KGB to believe Konon was posted in Beijing as a member of the Soviet trade mission.

In 1959, Molody began receiving British military secrets from Admiralty Underwater Weapons Establishment clerk Harry Houghton. Molody clandestinely liaised with the Krogers in London as well during his European trips and ran other spies, including Melita Norwood. The Krogers acted as his technical support; he communicated with Moscow via their hidden radio transmitter.

== UK conviction for espionage ==
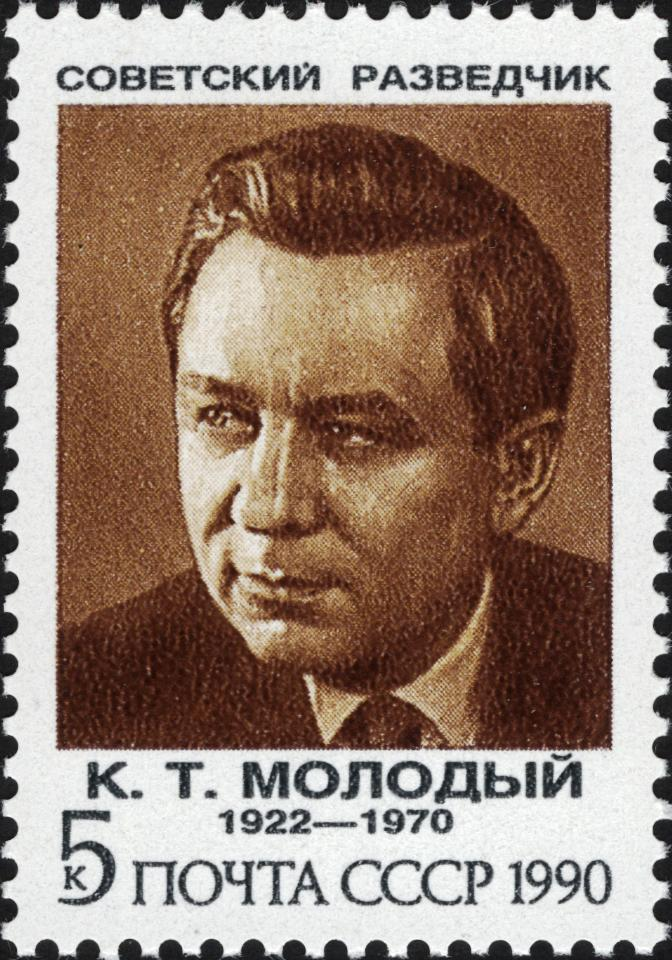
Molody on a 1990 Soviet stamp. (Note: Part of a set of five, the other four showing the spies Stanislav Vaupshasov, Rudolf Abel, Kim Philby and Ivan Kudrya.)

Molody came under suspicion from MI5 in 1959 after a meeting with Houghton. At the request of MI5, the Treasury gave permission to search a private safe box at the Midland Bank on Great Portland Street. Concealed within a lighter was a London map for places to conceal or collect information.

MI5 officers have no power of arrest, so on 7 January 1961 a Metropolitan Police Special Branch team under Detective Superintendent George Gordon Smith arrested all five members of the Portland spy ring. Molody was arrested on the Waterloo Bridge the same moment he had received classified material from Harry Houghton. At Scotland Yard, he told Smith he would not disclose his real name or address or any other information. MI5, the Central Intelligence Agency (CIA), and the Royal Canadian Mounted Police (RCMP) investigators' team had to resort to extensive enquiries. They were able to pinpoint his Russian origin, naval background, and use of false Canadian papers.

On 13 March 1961 at the Old Bailey, Molody was charged with spying, along with associates Harry Houghton, Ethel Gee and Morris and Lona Cohen (Peter and Helen Kroger). At the time of the trial, British authorities were still unsure of his true identity. In March 1961, the defendants were found guilty, and Molody received a 25-year sentence. He was to start his sentence at Winson Green Prison, Birmingham. From his single cell, he fraternised with some of the Great Train Robbers. In due course, the British and American security services managed to establish his true identity as Russian citizen Konon Molody.

On 22 April 1964, he was exchanged in a spy-swap for Greville Wynne, a British businessman and spy apprehended and convicted in Moscow for his contacts with Oleg Penkovsky. The prisoners were swapped at the Heerstraße Checkpoint in Berlin.

== Later life in Russia ==
A year after his return to the Soviet Union he published a book Spy: Memoirs of Gordon Lonsdale with the author still maintaining he was born in Canada. Issued with the approval of the Soviet authorities, he also claimed Peter and Helen Kroger, convicted as members of the Portland Ring, were innocent.

Molody died from a stroke on a mushroom picking expedition in a suburban forest in September 1970 at the age of 48. Konon's youth friend and retired KGB intelligence agent Leonid Kolosov co-wrote The Dead Season: End of the Legend. He maintained that Konon was healthy upon his return from the UK but began complaining about KGB doctors giving him injections against high blood pressure. Konon had headaches he never had before but the doctors said he should expect to "feel worse before he felt better".

He is buried at the Donskoy Cemetery in Moscow next to Vilyam Genrikovich Fisher (aka Colonel Rudolf Abel).

== Popular culture ==
A 1968 film Dead Season was based on Molody's mission in the UK. Molody advised Donatas Banionis who played him, and believed that resemblance between him and the actor was significant.
