= Michał Goleniewski =

Polish spy (1922–1993)

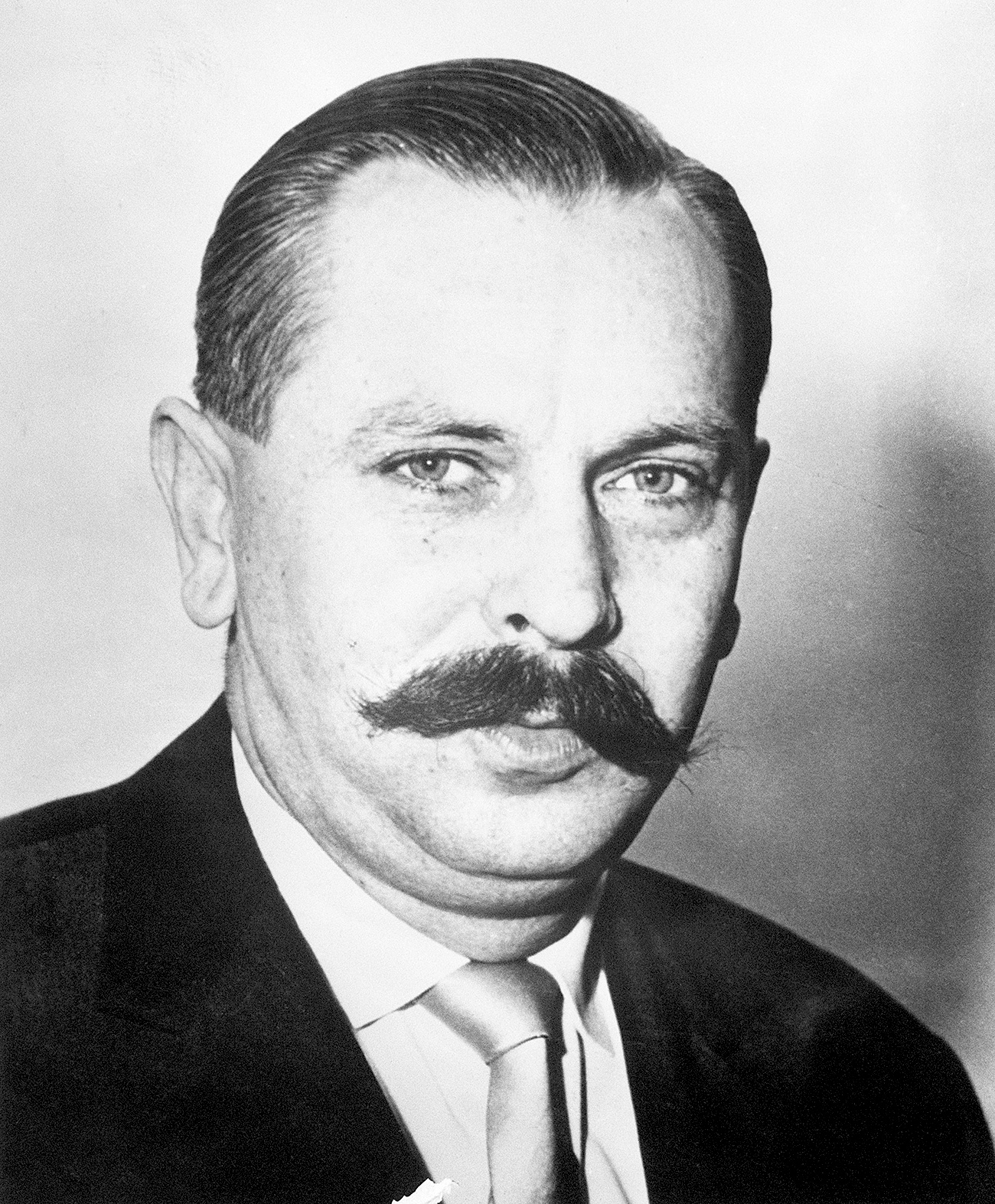
- Goleniewski in 1965

Personal details
- Born: 16 August 1922 Nieśwież, Poland
- Died: 2 July 1993 (aged 70) New York City, U.S.
- Awards: Knight's Cross of the Order of Polonia Restituta

Military service
- Allegiance: Ministry of Public Security; Main Directorate of Information of the Polish Army; 1st Department of Ministry of Interior; CIA
- Years of service: 1945–1961
- Rank: Lieutenant colonel

Michał Franciszek Goleniewski (16 August 1922 – 12 July 1993), also known as SNIPER and LAVINIA, was a Polish spy and military officer.

He was an officer in the Polish People's Republic's Ministry of Public Security, deputy head of military counterintelligence GZI WP, later head of the Polish Intelligence technical and scientific section, and in the 1950s a spy for the Soviet government.

In 1959 he became a "triple agent", giving Polish and Soviet secrets to the Central Intelligence Agency that directly exposed George Blake and Harry Houghton. In 1961 Goleniewski defected to the United States.

He later made unsubstantiated claims to be Tsarevich Alexei Nikolaevich of Russia.

== Early life and espionage career ==
Goleniewski was born in 1922 in Nieśwież, then in Poland, now Belarus. He enlisted in the Polish Army in 1945 and was commissioned a lieutenant colonel in the Polish Army in 1955. He studied law at the University of Poznan and received a master's degree in political science from the University of Warsaw in 1956. He said he was head of the Technical and Scientific Department of the Polish Secret Service from 1957 to 1960. At the same time, he was spying on Polish intelligence operations for the Soviet Union.

In early 1959, Goleniewski became a triple-agent, anonymously sending Polish and Soviet secrets addressed to the US Federal Bureau of Investigation (FBI) by letter. He insisted on communicating with the FBI, knowing that all other agencies had been penetrated by Soviet bloc intelligence. His letters were intercepted by the Central Intelligence Agency (CIA), who did not inform the FBI. According to Tim Tate, author of the 2021 book The Spy Who Was Left Out in the Cold, Goleniewski's motive, unlike most defectors who sought a better life outside the Soviet Union, was that he "realised that the communist system was wrong. And that he needed, ... to counter it, and to start working for the west and democracy".

The US CIA gave him the code-name 'SNIPER', UK's MI5 gave him 'LAVINIA'. In April 1959, the CIA informed MI5 that SNIPER (his real name was still unknown) had said the Polish Służba Bezpieczeństwa (SB, Security Service) had a British informant inside the Royal Navy. This person was later found to be Harry Houghton. The CIA also told MI5 that Goleniewski had received top secret documents originating from a Soviet mole inside MI6. The mole himself (who later turned out to be George Blake) heard the news that the CIA had a top-level informant in Poland, and sent word back to the KGB, who passed it to the UB. Goleniewski heard the news from the KGB, and immediately escaped. He also provided information that led to the arrests of American diplomat Irvin C. Scarbeck, Swedish Air Force officer Stig Wennerström, as well as Heinz Felfe and Hans Clemens, who penetrated the West German BND for the KGB. Goleniewski also claimed that there was a Soviet-controlled organisation of former Nazis—which he nicknamed 'Hacke'—that was active in postwar West Germany.

He defected to the United States in January 1961, which led to the imprisonment of Soviet agents in Britain including the Portland spy ring and George Blake. Goleniewski went to work for the CIA, and a Polish court sentenced him to death in absentia. A private bill, H.R. 5507, was introduced in the U.S. Congress in July 1963 to make Goleniewski a US citizen. The legislation was passed by both the United States House of Representatives and the United States Senate.

According to Tate, who used freedom of information requests to obtain CIA files on Goleniewski which had never been made public before, Goleniewski as of 2021 had identified more spies than any other defector or agent. Tate has also written a background article on him. However, when Anatoliy Golitsyn defected to the US, he convinced the CIA's head of counter-intelligence that only he, Golitsyn, was a true defector, all others being bogus. From 1964 the CIA started to renege on its contract with Goleniewski and brief other government departments that he had lost his mind. This caused Goleniewski much financial and emotional distress, and he lost his grip on reality, becoming paranoid, and ultimately completely insane, according to Tate. Although CIA records were obtained, MI5's file on Goleniewski was not released, with MI5 claiming "continuing sensitivity".

== Claim that he was Tsarevich Alexei ==
Goleniewski later made the claim that he was Tsarevich Alexei Nikolaevich, who is now known to have been killed with his family by Bolsheviks at Ekaterinburg, Russia on 17 July 1918. Goleniewski claimed that Yakov Yurovsky, one of the assassins, saved the family and helped them to escape. The whole family supposedly traveled to Poland via Turkey, Greece, and Austria. According to his story, the family lived in hiding in Poland. As author Guy Richards (one of Goleniewski's supporters) has pointed out, he was not the first Tsarevich Alexei claimant to emerge from Poland; several decades earlier, in 1927, a pretender named Eugene Nicolaievich Ivanoff had appeared from the same part of that country and generated a brief flurry of publicity in Europe and North America.

Tsarevich Alexei, who was born in August 1904, was a haemophiliac. Goleniewski, whose identity card gave his date of birth as 1922, making him eighteen years younger than the Tsarevich, claimed that the haemophilia made him appear younger than he really was and he had been "twice a child." He claimed that his haemophilia had been confirmed by Alexander S. Wiener, who had co-discovered the Rh factor in human blood. This claim was never confirmed.

He met one of the Grand Duchess Anastasia Nikolaevna of Russia claimants, Eugenia Smith, in 1963. The meeting was covered by Life magazine. Goleniewski claimed that Smith was his sister Anastasia. Smith also recognized Goleniewski as her brother Alexei, even though she had claimed in her book that she had been the sole survivor at Ekaterinburg.

Goleniewski's claim was an embarrassment to the CIA. He was put on a pension and his employment with the agency was ended in 1964.

Goleniewski also claimed to have detailed information about alleged Tsarist money. His claims are detailed in the books Lost Fortune of the Tsars by William Clarke, and Hunt for the Czar by Guy Richards.

== Marriage ==
Goleniewski married his pregnant girlfriend, Ingrid Kampf, on 30 September 1964, using the name Alexei Romanov. The marriage later broke up.

== Later life ==
Goleniewski lived the remainder of his life in Queens, New York, still claiming that he was Tsarevich Alexei. He leveled accusations against the government and the Russian Orthodox Church for mistreating him. Few believed his claim.

== Awards and decorations ==
- Knight's Cross of the Order of Polonia Restituta
- Golden Cross of Merit
- Silver Cross of Merit
- Bronze Cross of Merit
- Medal of Victory and Freedom 1945

== See also ==
- Ryszard Kukliński
- Romuald Spasowski
- Józef Światło
- Romanov impostors
- List of Eastern Bloc defectors
