= Lona Cohen =

American-born Soviet spy (1913–1992)

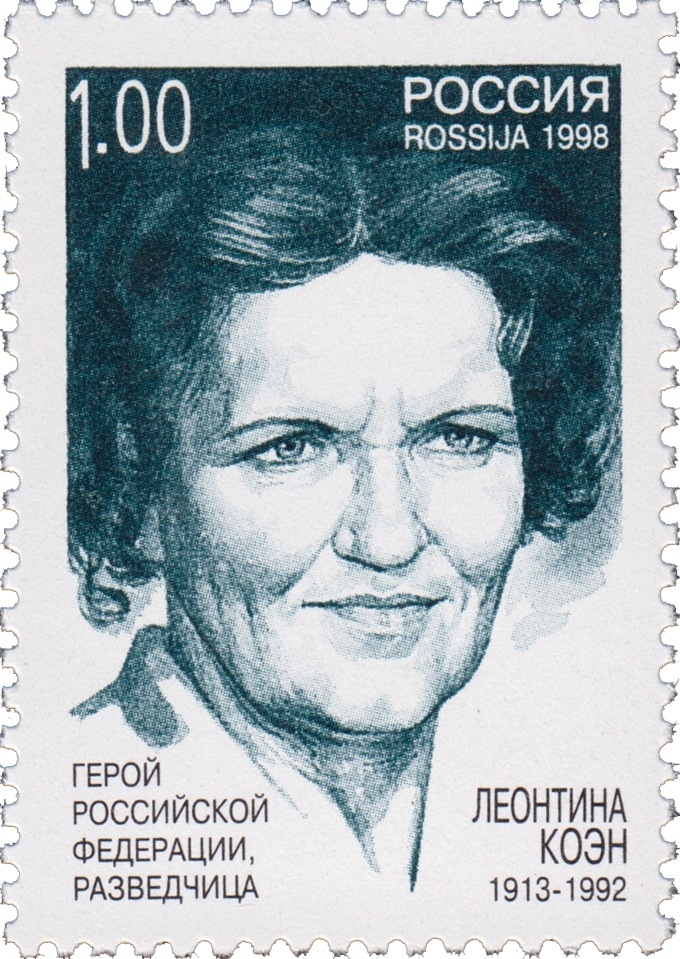
- Cohen on a 1998 Russian stamp, with her first name as "Leontina"
- Born: Leontine Theresa Petka; January 11, 1913; Adams, Massachusetts, U.S.
- Died: December 23, 1992 (aged 79); Moscow, Russia
- Spouse: Morris Cohen
- Awards: Hero of the Russian Federation (1996); Order of the Red Banner, Order of Friendship of Nations
- Espionage activity
- Allegiance: Soviet Union
- Service years: 1939–1961 (arrest)
- Codename: Helen Kroger

Lona Cohen (Russian: Леонтина Владиславовна Коэн, Leontina Vladislavovna Koen; January 11, 1913 – December 23, 1992), born Leontine Theresa Petka, also known as Helen Kroger, was an American who spied for the Soviet Union. She is known for her role in smuggling atomic bomb diagrams out of Los Alamos. She was a communist activist before marrying Morris Cohen. The couple became spies because of their communist beliefs.

They were both arrested in Britain in 1961, and convicted of espionage for the Soviet Union the following year. After serving part of a prison sentence, Lona Cohen and her husband were exchanged by the British in 1969. They lived the remainder of their lives in Moscow, teaching spy skills.

== Early life ==
Lona Cohen was born Leontine Theresa Petka in Adams, Massachusetts, the daughter of Polish Catholic immigrants. At the age of 15, Lona left her parents' home in Taftsville, Connecticut and moved to New York City. By 1928, she had joined the Socialist Party. While in Greenwich Village, Lona had left her parents' Catholic faith and had become an atheist. She also separated from the Socialist Party at this time, becoming a member of the Communist Party. George Blake, a British mole for the Soviet Union, claimed in an interview that Lona was a "very, very resolute woman, very determined."

== Espionage ==
=== In the United States ===
At the time of her marriage to Morris Cohen in 1941, she did not know that her husband was a spy for the Soviet Union. That year he recruited her into Soviet espionage out of the New York rezidentura. She and Morris first worked for Soviet control officer Semyon Semyonov until Semyonov was identified to the FBI in an anonymous letter, after which he was recalled back to Moscow. After four months, Lona and Morris were assigned to a new control officer, Anatoli Yatskov.

The Cohens were first tasked with stealing for the Soviet Union details of newly developed American weapons. Lona met a young man, identified in her report as Allen, who worked at an aircraft plant in Hartford, Connecticut. She asked Allen to smuggle a working model of a new machine gun out of his plant. He agreed, in exchange for $2,000. By carrying it on his shoulders beneath his coat, Allen was able to sneak it out of the plant. Morris then hid the weapon inside a bass fiddle case and transported it into the Soviet consulate while avoiding detection.

After Morris was drafted in 1942, Lona took over the expanding Volunteer Network that Morris had been maintaining and managed seven agents. Their work was titled Line X. As part of Line X, Lona conducted "technical, scientific, and industrial espionage", delivering and receiving documents along the East Coast. She frequently received documents from seamen from South America and Europe, using her charm to persuade dock-workers to permit her access to the ships. Later, Semyonov wrote an appraisal of Cohen, commending her love of the Soviet Union and her work with agent Link, eventually identified as Bill Weisband.

While conducting her Line X work, she worked at two defense plants. First, in 1942, at Publix Metals as a machine operator, and then in 1943 at Aircraft Screw Products. While working at Aircraft Screw Products, Lona was in an accident and had part of her hair ripped from her head. In another incident, a supervisor she worked under accused her of preaching Communism.

As word leaked to the Soviets of the developing Manhattan Project, Lona Cohen was chosen by her new control officer, Anatoli Yatskov, to work as a courier. Lona's job was to transport classified information from Theodore Hall, and a source cover named "FOGEL" and "PERS" from the American secret atomic weapons project at Los Alamos, New Mexico and carry them to the Soviet consulate in New York. There, a KGB sub-residency under a young engineer, Leonid R. Kvasnikov, coordinated operations and dispatched intelligence to Moscow.(Intelligence historian Nigel West, who identified Rudolf Peierls as the spy codenamed "Fogel" and later "Pers" in the Venona intercepts, and his wife Genia as the spy codenamed "Tina". However, the association of Tina with Genia did not fit with what was known about Tina, and she was conclusively revealed to be Melita Norwood in 1999. Nor did Peierls fit Pers, as the latter worked at the Clinton Engineer Works, whereas Peierls did not. There were good reasons for the postwar intelligence agencies to suspect Peierls. He not only had recruited Fuchs, and served as his "sponsor" on recruitment and security matters, but had pressed the authorities for Fuchs to be given a full security clearance without which he could not have assisted Peierls in his work. Fuchs lived with the Peierls family for a time. Peierls had a Russian wife, as did his brother, and he maintained close contact with colleagues in the Soviet Union before and after the Second World War.) Lona met with Hall for the first time in late August 1945, outside a church in Albuquerque, New Mexico. She had been to this church the previous four Sundays, but Hall had been confused about the date of their meet and did not show up until nearly a month after originally scheduled, forcing her to attend Catholic Mass despite being an atheist. Hall gave her the report that she had traveled for, and she was sent back to New York. To avoid detection she concealed the report inside a Kleenex box, a move which became known within Soviet spy circles for its cleverness. After returning to New York, it was discovered that the report she had helped deliver contained a complete diagram of the first atomic bomb.

After the defections of Elizabeth Bentley and Igor Gouzenko, the Cohens ended contact with Soviet intelligence until 1949, at which time they began working with Col. Rudolph Abel, a U.S.-based "illegal" (not using diplomatic cover for spying).

=== From 1950 ===
After Klaus Fuchs was arrested in the United Kingdom in 1950, Cohen and her husband had no choice but to flee to Moscow. They left their home in New York and never returned to America, passing the southern border and travelling through Mexico. They were placed in Lublin, Poland, until 1954. There, Morris worked as an English teacher. The Cohens went on many foreign missions for the Soviets during this time, traveling to Japan, Hong Kong, Australia, New Zealand, Austria, Belgium, and the Netherlands. They received New Zealand passports in Paris from the New Zealand embassy, and also made trips to Canada. In Moscow, Lona had received additional training as a radio operator and cipher clerk.

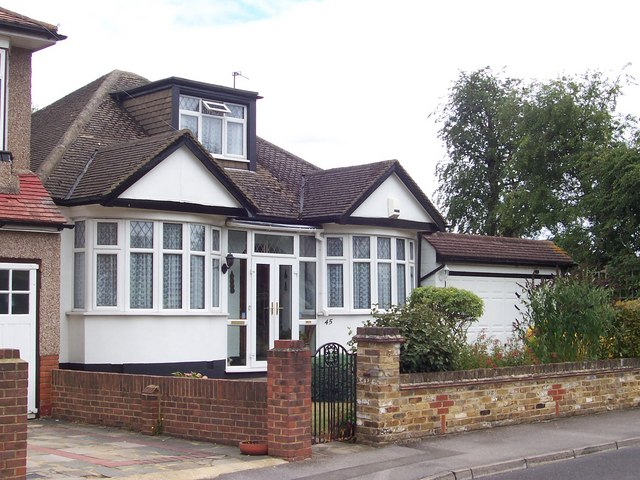
The Cohen's former house in Ruislip was found to contain equipment and materials for use in spying.

In 1954, the couple settled in Ruislip, west London, under the names Helen and Peter Kroger. They used the New Zealand passports they had received in Paris and claimed to be native Canadians. They set up an antiquarian book business which served as cover for their activities of running the London Illegal Rezidentura. Gordon Lonsdale (Konon Molody, a KGB agent) worked with them as part of the Portland spy ring. In the basement of their house, at 45 Cranley Drive, Ruislip, situated not far from the military airfield of RAF Northolt, they set up a high-speed radio transmitter and began sending Moscow "information of special importance".

While in London, the Cohens were friends with Frank and Nora Doel. Frank Doel is the bookseller whose correspondence with the author Helene Hanff became the bestseller, 84, Charing Cross Road. In her follow-up book, The Duchess of Bloomsbury Street, Hanff reported an anecdote told her by Nora Doel. One New Year's Eve, the Doels gave a party at which Lona Cohen (aka Helen Kroger):

arrived looking very exotic in a long black evening dress. 'Helen, you look like a Russian spy!' said Nora. And Helen laughed and Peter laughed and a few months later Nora picked up the morning paper and discovered that Helen and Peter Kruger were Russian spies.

== Arrest, trial and imprisonment ==
In January 1961, the couple were arrested for espionage; in March she was convicted and received a sentence of 20 years. Her husband Morris Cohen was sentenced to 25 years.

Before being taken into custody, Cohen/Kroger had asked permission to stoke up the boiler. Before she could do so, Detective Superintendent Smith, a veteran "spy catcher" who was in charge of the arrest, insisted on checking her handbag. It was found to contain microdots, the photographic reduction of documents, in order to make them small enough to be smuggled out of the country more easily.

== Prisoner exchange and later life in Moscow ==
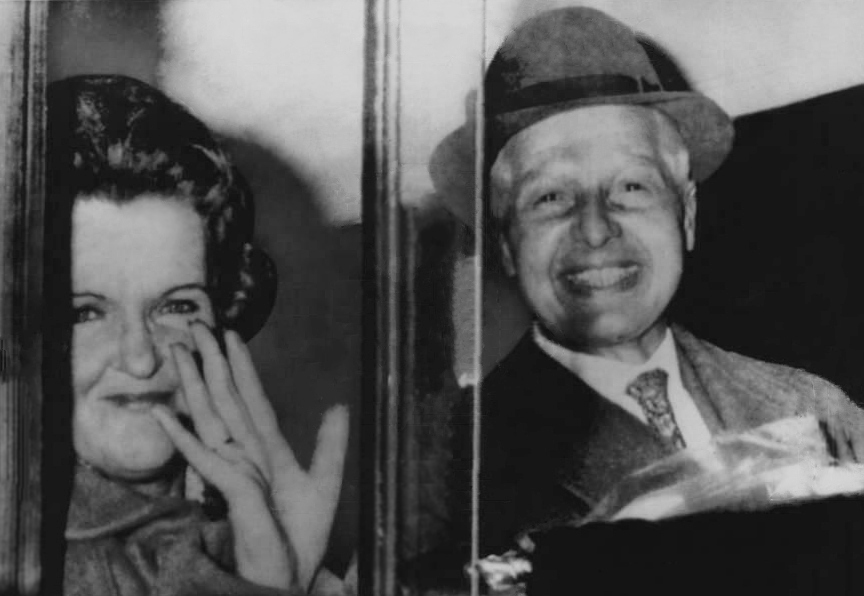
Lona and Morris Cohen after being released from jail in 1969

In 1969, the British arranged a prisoner exchange, trading the Cohens with the Soviet Union for a British subject, Gerald Brooke, as well as Michael Parsons and Mr. Anthony Lorraine, the British subjects who in 1968 were sentenced by Soviet courts for smuggling drugs into the Soviet Union. Once in Moscow, the Cohens continued training colleagues for intelligence operations abroad according to Jack Barsky, a KGB sleeper agent who wrote about meeting the Cohens before being sent to the US in 1978. Later, the Cohens were provided with pensions by the KGB.

Lona Cohen died in Moscow on December 23, 1992. She was 79 years of age. Her husband, Morris, lived for three more years following her death. They were both buried in the KGB's Novokuntsevo Cemetery.

== Awards ==
Both Lona and Morris Cohen received the Order of the Red Banner from the Soviet Union. Both were also given the title of Heroes of the Russian Federation.

== Representation in other media ==
In 1983, the British playwright Hugh Whitemore dramatized the case as Pack of Lies, which was performed in London's West End theatre district starring Judi Dench and Michael Williams. It played on Broadway for 3½ months in 1985, for which Rosemary Harris won the best actress Tony Award for her portrayal of the British neighbor of the Cohens/Krogers. It was made into a TV movie starring Ellen Burstyn, Alan Bates, Teri Garr and Daniel Benzali (as "Peter Schaefer", i.e., "Peter Kroger", i.e., Morris Cohen) which aired in the U.S. on CBS in 1987. The plot centered on the neighbors (and seeming friends) whose house was used as a base from which the security services could spy on the Cohens, and the way paranoia, suspicion and betrayal gradually destroyed their lives during that time.

The Cohens' cover as antiquarian book dealers Peter and Helen Kroger is mentioned in Helene Hanff's The Duchess of Bloomsbury Street because they were friends of London book dealer Frank Doel, recipient of the letters and book orders that inspired the bestseller 84 Charing Cross Road.

== See also ==
- List of female Heroes of the Russian Federation

== Cited sources ==
- Carr, Barnes (2016) Operation Whisper: The Capture of Soviet Spies Morris and Lona Cohen. Lebanon NH: The University Press of New England. ISBN 9781611688092
- Lee, Sabine (Winter 2002). "The Spy that Never Was". Intelligence and National Security. 17 (4): 77–99. doi:10.1080/02684520412331306650. ISSN 0268-4527. S2CID 154260723.
- Peierls, Rudolf (1985). Bird of Passage: Recollections of a Physicist. Princeton, New Jersey: Princeton University Press. ISBN 0-691-08390-8. OCLC 925040112.
