= Jane Sissmore =

British MI5 and SIS officer

Jane Archer MBE
- Jane Sissmore in 1924
- Born: Kathleen Maria Margaret Sissmore; 11 March 1898; Bengal, British India
- Died: September 1982 (aged 84); Dorset, England
- Other name: Jane Archer
- Occupations: MI5 Security Service officer Secret Intelligence Service officer
- Spouse: John Oliver Archer

Kathleen Maria Margaret Sissmore, MBE (1898–1982), was known as Jane Sissmore and then Jane Archer after her marriage in 1939. In 1929 she became the first woman of officer rank in Britain's Security Service, MI5, and was still their only woman officer at the time of her dismissal for insubordination in 1940. She had been responsible for investigations into Soviet intelligence and subversion. She then joined the Secret Intelligence Service (MI6), but when Kim Philby, later to be exposed as a double agent, became her boss he reduced her investigative work because he feared she might uncover his treachery.

In his memoirs, Philby wrote, "After Guy Liddell, Jane was perhaps the ablest professional intelligence officer ever employed by MI5". Following management changes in MI5, she returned there in 1945 or 1946.

== Personal life ==
Jane Sissmore, the daughter of Colonel John Edmund Angelo Sissmore and Kathleen Maud Forbes-Smith was born in Bengal on 11 March 1898 and moved to London in her early childhood with her parents and elder brother. Her father became a tea merchant. Sissmore became head girl at Princess Helena College, Ealing and was recruited to MI5 in 1916 as an eighteen-year-old clerk after her head-teacher was asked to send suitable school leavers to MI5. She has been described as "one of MI5's most remarkable wartime recruits". In her spare time she trained to be a barrister, becoming the fifth woman to be admitted to Gray's Inn, and, after obtaining first-class exam results, was called to the bar in 1924. The day before World War II broke out Sissmore, still MI5's only woman of officer rank, married Wing Commander John Oliver "Joe" Archer, CBE, who became the liaison officer between MI5 and the Royal Air Force. Jane Archer died in Dorset in September 1982.

=== John Archer ===
John Oliver Archer (22 September 1887 – 15 September 1968) was born in Walton-on-the-Naze. In 1916 he married Esther Chilton and they had two children born in 1917 and 1922. Esther died in 1930. Their son, John Chilton Archer, became, like his father, a wing commander in the RAF but he was killed in action in 1943.

In the Great War Archer started serving in the ranks of the Seaforth Highlanders with whom he gained the Mons Star. In the Royal Field Artillery he gained his pilot's licence in 1915 and served in the Royal Air Force in South Russia. This continued after the war had ended and in 1919 he was awarded the OBE, followed by the CBE in 1920. Upon taking command in India he was in 1926 promoted to wing commander and he returned to Britain in 1931 to work in the Air Ministry. He retired from military duty in 1935 but continued in a civilian role. In 1940 he was re-commissioned as a group captain to serve throughout the war in the Directorate of Intelligence as liaison officer with MI5.

== MI5 – clerk and officer ==
Appointed to MI5 in 1916 as typist/clerk, by 1929 Sissmore had become Controller of the Registry, within 'H' Branch, and of women staff. At the time, and until 1940, Vernon Kell was director of MI5. Sissmore was appointed a Member of the Order of the British Empire (MBE) in the 1923 Birthday Honours as an "Administrative Assistant, General Staff, War Office" and in 1929 moved to B Division (investigations and inquiries) where she was in charge of investigating Soviet intelligence and subversion activity. This made her MI5's first woman of officer rank and she was to become what Christopher Andrew has described as a "formidable interrogator".

In 1937 Roger Hollis applied to join MI5 and Kell asked Sissmore to make an informal assessment of him which she did at her tennis club, also involving the then still junior Dick White. The formal interview panel rejected Hollis but he was nevertheless employed on Kell's decision provided Sissmore took responsibility for him. Thus Hollis became Sissmore's assistant (and went on to become MI5 Director-General in 1956).

Jane Archer's 1940 debriefing of Walter Krivitsky was done using the name "Mrs Moore" and it has been described by Christopher Andrew as "the first really professional debriefing of a Soviet Intelligence officer on either side of the Atlantic". Krivitsky had been a Soviet agent in continental Europe who had defected to the West in 1937 and whose revelations in the United States in September 1939 had created a press sensation. In particular from a British point of view he revealed that two Soviet agents were currently working in Britain – the one whose surname he was able to give was quickly identified, tried and convicted of spying. His description of the other agent (cryptonym homer) was more elusive. Archer suggested Krivitsky should be invited to Britain to be interviewed and he agreed to this.

The debriefing by Archer took four weeks and, to let Krivitsky feel he was highly valued, at the start she was accompanied by Valentine Vivian, head of counter-espionage at SIS, and Jasper Harker, head of B Division and Archer's boss. Then Archer took over the lead role and elicited a great deal of information. Archer's report (a "masterly analysis" according to Nigel West) was 85 pages long and much of it subsequently became incorporated in an MI5 overall review of Soviet intelligence activity.

Krivitsky's disclosures might have made it possible to work out that both Donald Maclean and Kim Philby were Soviet agents but this opportunity was missed. Andrew argues that the clues were too slight to have been usable. Chapman Pincher considers (Note: Chapman Pincher's account of the history of MI5 and SIS differs from those written with official involvement, including Christopher Andrew's. Pincher (an investigative journalist specialising in intelligence) claims the book written by Andrew (a Cambridge University professor of history, also specialising in intelligence) deliberately omits important material. On the other hand, Andrew has reviewed documents unavailable to Pincher. Generally, this article follows Andrew's account and cites him. Where the claims are irreconcilable this article gives an inline citation to Pincher alone. A major difference is Pincher's claim that Hollis was a "mole" and that official information about him has been obfuscated to support denial. Informed commentators differ in how much to believe of Pincher's claims.) that Archer and Hollis were at fault but largely absolves Archer because she was almost immediately moved to completely different work. Hollis then filled her old post. Archer's debriefing completely transformed the understanding of the top echelons of MI5 about current Soviet espionage activity in Britain – they now realised it was extensive whereas only a year earlier it had wrongly been thought non-existent. In January 1941 one such Soviet agent Anthony Blunt, who was working within MI5, passed Archer's entire report to his Soviet controller.

In October 1940, MI5 moved offices from unlikely temporary premises at Wormwood Scrubs Prison to the even less likely Blenheim Palace. At a top-level meeting at that venue in November Archer criticised Brigadier Harker, recently appointed acting director of MI5, for incompetence. Harker, who had previously been her head of division, then dismissed her. Concerning this Guy Liddell, director of counter-espionage, wrote of Harker "but for his incompetence, the situation would never have arisen" but he also thought that Archer had "unfortunately gone too far". Shortly afterwards David Petrie was appointed as the next director general and Harker was made his deputy – indeed Andrew's view is that Harker's dismissal of Archer probably contributed to Harker being put out to grass. (Note: Andrew concludes Harker was "not up to the job".) For the rest of the war MI5 employed no other women as officers although several did work at this level of seniority but without formal recognition.

== Secret Intelligence Service ==
Archer straight away took up a post in the Secret Intelligence Service (SIS) and was placed in charge of Irish section, within Section V, involved in analysing intelligence about suspect Irish political organisations. Espionage was not involved but an information service was provided to Whitehall of "events of political or public interest in Eire" – SIS had become involved because MI5 had refused to take this on.

Later during the war, in 1944, Archer transferred to Section IX which was concerned with Soviet and communist counter-intelligence with Kim Philby as head of section. It was unfortunate for both Archer and SIS that Philby, later to be unmasked as a Soviet "mole", recognised her considerable abilities. In his memoirs My Silent War Philby wrote:

I was in the middle of my recruiting campaign when Vivian [Valentine Vivian] told me that Jane Archer had become available, suggesting that she would make an excellent addition to Section IX. The suggestion came as a nasty shock, especially as I could think of no plausible reason for resisting it. After Guy Liddell, Jane was perhaps the ablest professional intelligence officer ever employed by MI5. She had spent a big chunk of a shrewd lifetime studying Communist activity in all its aspects. It was she who had interrogated General Krivitsky, the Red Army intelligence officer who defected to the West in 1937, only to kill himself a few years later in the United States – a disillusioned man. From him, she had got a tantalising scrap of information about a young English journalist whom the Soviet intelligence had sent to Spain during the Civil War. And here she was pluncked down in my midst!

— Kim Philby, My Silent War (2003), Chapter VII. From War to Peace (Note: A preview of Philby's book is available online.)

Philby (who had himself been "the young English journalist") made efforts to guard against the threat of her uncovering his background and his current role as a Soviet agent. He later wrote "Jane would have made a very bad enemy". He therefore sidelined her and gave her the task of analysing intercepted radio traffic from Eastern Europe.

Archer's step-daughter Jean Collard has said that after Archer had started expressing suspicions about Philby she was "eased out of the intelligence services". So in 1944 things were not going well for Archer. Liddell wrote in his diary

Lunched with Jane (Archer) – she will lose her pensions if not reinstated. Certainly it would be a scandal if after her many years of service she was given nothing. I advised her to stick at SIS until re-org sorted and if worst comes to worst. I'll try and get back to her what she is really due.

— Guy Liddell, Second World War Diaries (1944), 6 September 1944

== Return to MI5 ==
Archer was encouraged to move back to MI5 and she was located in C Division which was concerned with security clearance. (Note: Archer had certainly returned to MI5 by November 1946 and her move back was probably earlier in the same year. Andrew in his authorised history of MI5 does not mention Archer returning nor her involvement in any subsequent activities. Other sources are not clear about when she returned.) Petrie and Harker retired during 1946 to be replaced by Percy Sillitoe as director general and Liddell as his deputy.

Igor Gouzenko, a cipher clerk in Soviet embassy in Ottawa, defected in 1945 with a mass of documents, one of which led to the arrest of Alan Nunn May for spying. Philby recommended that Hollis rather than Archer should be sent to Canada to interview Gouzenko although he knew Archer would be better able to do the job. (Note: It is unclear whether or not Archer had returned to MI5, more likely she had not.) Agreeing this, MI5 sent Hollis and yet it was Philby at SIS who was apprised of progress and who altered, delayed and omitted messages before passing them on to MI5. By these means, Philby stopped Archer from having any involvement in the case.

In 1947 Klaus Fuchs was vetted by MI5 for work at Harwell on the British post-war atomic project. MI5 had only been informed that Fuchs was to do "Atomic Energy work of extreme importance", not that Britain was starting an independent atomic bomb development programme. C Division considered he should be removed from such work but B Division (counter-espionage) supported giving security clearance because of weak evidence against him and strong scientific references. Archer wrote a memo advising that the Atomic Energy Directorate should be warned that "Fuchs is a possible Russian agent ... [who] ... should be divorced from all contact with atomic energy". However, B Division's view prevailed. In 1949, in the aftermath of the test explosion of the Soviet Union's first atomic bomb, new United States Venona decrypts led the FBI to conclude that Fuchs had been a spy on the Manhattan Project and, although subsequent MI5 surveillance produced little evidence of his still being a spy, Fuchs confessed to espionage in both countries and he was sentenced to 14 years' imprisonment. Archer also recommended that Rudolf Peierls should not be allowed to continue as a consultant to Harwell but he went on to have a highly distinguished scientific career.

Archer was involved in following up further leads from the Venona decryption being carried out in the US at Arlington Hall. Early in 1951 MI5 were told that Krivitsky's homer was actually Donald Maclean and they investigated him to try to find evidence that could be used in court. (Note: Maclean worked in the Foreign Office.) On account of his position in SIS Philby was kept apprised and so, as well as warning Moscow, he invented a pretext for requiring Guy Burgess, who was with Philby at the embassy in Washington, to be recalled to London so he could warn Maclean. (Note: Burgess had worked in the Foreign Office and was posted at the British embassy in Washington, D.C. when Philby arranged for his recall.) A few days before Maclean was due to be arrested he and Burgess absconded to Russia. Burgess had not been under serious suspicion but the idea that the men had been warned led MI5 to suspect Philby for the first time. Archer and Arthur Martin were asked to compile a résumé of Philby's past – the coincidence with the "young English journalist" was noticed and Archer uncovered a slim MI5 file on him dating back to 1939. Presented with MI5's evidence and under pressure from Washington, the head of SIS still did not doubt Philby's loyalty but asked him to retire with a golden handshake. (Note: Philby eventually fled to Russia in 1963.)

In 1952, while examining the papers left in Burgess's flat, Archer found documents describing secret meetings that were then discovered to have been written by John Cairncross. (Note: Cairncross had worked at Bletchley Park.) Cairncross was tailed going to a meeting with his controller, Yuri Modin, but the actual meeting did not take place when the controller spotted the surveillance. Although Cairncross would not fully admit he was a spy, he was forced to resign and he moved to the United States. (Note: So successful had Soviet intelligence been in infiltrating MI5 and SIS with the Cambridge Five that many at the KGB headquarters in Moscow believed that the Five were part of a "fiendishly clever" British plot and doubted the reliability of what they were being told. Because of this, and the need to tell Stalin what he wanted to hear, poor use was made of the high quality information they were receiving.)

In the 1960s Peter Wright and Arthur Martin conducted their own private enquiry into whether Hollis, director of MI5 or Graham Mitchell, deputy director, were traitors. (Note: This was quite separate from an official investigation (fluency) going on at the same time about MI5 penetration.) In Spycatcher, Wright says that Martin interviewed Archer and that later when Wright spoke to her she said she considered both men unreliable but suggested Hollis was more likely to be a spy. However, Christopher Andrew comments on an anecdote about Anthony Blunt (Note: Gouzenko had claimed that a Soviet agent (elli) was working within MI5. Anthony Blunt worked for MI5 during World War II and confessed to having been a Soviet spy in 1964, although this had been suspected within MI5 as early as 1951. Blunt was recognised as being the "fourth man" in 1974 and his actions were made public in 1979.)

Blunt recalled one particularly dramatic example of Hollis's suspicions. After Gouzenko had revealed the existence of an unidentified Soviet agent codenamed elli, Hollis turned to Blunt and said, "Isn't that so ELLI?" It was sadly ironic that Wright and Martin, the most damaging conspiracy theorists in the history of the Security Service, should later try and persuade themselves that the unidentified agent was Hollis himself.

— Christopher Andrew, The Defence of the Realm. The Authorized History of MI5 (2009), p. 282
