= Phoebe Pool =

Art historian and spy

- Born: 1913; London, United Kingdom
- Died: November or December 1971
- Education: Somerville College, Oxford
- Occupations: Art historian, Soviet spy
- Notable work: Impressionism (1967)
- Parents: Gordon Desmond Pool (father); Agatha Eleanor Burrows (mother)

Phoebe Pool (1913–1971) was a British art historian and spy for the Soviet Union.

== Life ==
Pool was born in London in 1913, the daughter of Gordon Desmond Pool and Agatha Eleanor Burrows. She suffered from depression at an early age, something which affected her education and output.

In 1931 Pool won a scholarship to Somerville College, Oxford, entering in 1932 to study history. While at Somerville, she joined the Communist Party of Great Britain (CPGB) in 1933. In 1934, Pool was awarded the Deakin History Essay Prize, but her mental illness prevented her from taking her degree. After leaving university, she lectured for the Workers' Educational Association (WEA) before working at Westminster Tutors in London from 1942. She also wrote reviews for The Spectator. During the Second World War she worked for Air Raid Precautions. In 1945 she edited a poetry anthology, Poems of Death.

=== Art historian ===
In 1954 Pool began studying art history as an external student at the Courtauld Institute of Art, University of London. She received a BA in 1957 with first class honours and two years later she obtained her PhD with her thesis on the literary and philosophical background to the early work of Pablo Picasso. Her supervisor was Anthony Blunt, who was also a spy for the Soviet Union. Blunt and Pool wrote a book together, Picasso: The Formative Years: a Study of his Sources (1962).

In 1964 she began lecturing part-time at the University of Reading. Her book on Impressionism from 1967 became a popular success. Pool used the library of the Courtauld Institute of Art for most of her research. Her writing style has been described as "simple, but not simplistic".

=== Soviet spy ===
In January 1934 Arnold Deutsch, an NKVD agent, was sent to London. Peter Wright, the author of Spycatcher (1987), claims that Deutsch established a spy network based around the University of Oxford. This included Phoebe Pool, Jenifer Hart, Bernard Floud and Goronwy Rees.

In 1963, Michael Straight faced a background check in response to an offer of government employment in Washington, D.C., and decided voluntarily to inform family friend and presidential special assistant Arthur M. Schlesinger, Jr. about his communist connections at Cambridge. This led directly to the exposure of Blunt as the recruiter of the Cambridge Five spy ring, who on 23 April 1964 admitted to Arthur S. Martin being a Soviet agent and named twelve other associates as spies including Phoebe Pool. Blunt told Martin that Pool had worked as his courier in the 1930s. MI5 arranged for Anita Brookner, another member of the Courtauld staff, to interview Pool. Pool confirmed Blunt's story and admitted passing messages with Hart to the Floud brothers from "Otto", identified as Arnold Deutsch. John Costello pointed out in his Mask of Treachery (1988) that "[t]his suggested that the Cambridge ring had spread its tentacles to Oxford."

Phoebe Pool died by suicide in December 1971 by throwing herself under a train.

== Selected bibliography ==
- Pool, Phoebe and Stephenson, Flora. Plan for Town and Country. London: Pilot Press, 1944.
- Pool, Phoebe (ed.). Poems of Death. London: Frederick Mueller, 1945.
- Pool, Phoebe and Blunt, Anthony. Picasso: The Formative Years: a Study of his Sources. Greenwich, CT: New York Graphic Society, 1962.
- Pool, Phoebe. Degas. London: Spring Books, 1963.
- Pool, Phoebe. John Constable. Blandford, 1964.
- Pool, Phoebe. Impressionism. New York: Praeger, 1967.
- Pool, Phoebe. Delacroix. London: Hamlyn, 1969.
- Pool, Phoebe. Paul Gauguin. New York: Funk & Wagnalls, 1978.
