= Graham Russell Mitchell =

British MI5 officer

Graham Mitchell CB, OBE
- Born: 4 November 1905; Kenilworth, Warwickshire, England
- Died: 19 November 1984 (aged 79); Sherington, Buckinghamshire, England
- Other name: Graham Russell Mitchell
- Education: Magdalen College, Oxford
- Occupations: MI5 Security Service officer and deputy director general

Graham Russell Mitchell OBE, CB (4 November 1905 – 19 November 1984), was an officer of MI5, the British Security Service, between 1939 and 1963, serving as its deputy director general between 1956 and 1963. In 1963 Roger Hollis, the MI5 director general, authorised the secret investigation of Mitchell following suspicions within the Secret Intelligence Service (MI6) that he was a Soviet agent. It is now thought unlikely that Mitchell ever was a "mole". Mitchell was an International Master of correspondence chess who represented Great Britain.

== Early life, family, and education ==
Graham Mitchell, the eldest child of Alfred Sherrington Mitchell, a captain in the Royal Warwickshire Regiment, and Sibyl Gemma Mitchell, née Heathcote, was born on 4 November 1905 in Kenilworth, Warwickshire.

He attended Winchester College, and later Magdalen College, Oxford to read politics, philosophy, and economics, earning his degree. In 1934, he married Eleonora Patricia Robertson (1909–1993), daughter of James Marshall Robertson, and the couple had two children.

== Sporting interests ==
As a child he had contracted poliomyelitis, which left him with a pronounced limp, but he nevertheless went on to become an accomplished golfer. He sailed for Oxford University. In lawn tennis, he was a partner in the men's doubles winning team of the Queen's Club Championships in 1930.

He represented Oxford University at over-the-board chess. He later represented Great Britain at correspondence chess. He placed fifth in the first International Correspondence Chess Federation (ICCF) World Championship tournament (1950–1953), and inflicted the only defeat on the eventual champion, Australian Cecil Purdy. From that result, scoring (+6 =4 -3), he earned the title of International Master of Correspondence Chess (IMC), in 1953.

== Early career ==
After graduation in 1927, Mitchell was briefly a journalist for the Illustrated London News. In the mid-1930s, he joined the research department of Conservative Central Office, led by Sir George Joseph Ball; Mitchell served as a statistician.; The "research department" was actually an intelligence service which had infiltrated Labour Party Headquarters.

== Joins MI5 ==
Unfit for military service because of his polio, he joined MI5 in November 1939, two months after the start of World War II, upon Ball's recommendation. Chapman Pincher and Nigel West both suggest that it was Ball's influence that enabled Mitchell to be accepted into that organisation; Ball himself had been in MI5 until 1927, and was later appointed to the highly secret home defence security executive.

=== World War II ===
Mitchell spent most of the war at Blenheim Palace, in Oxfordshire, to which most of MI5 was evacuated in 1940 due to bombing threats in London. Mitchell was a member of F Division, which was for monitoring subversion, and which was headed by Roger Hollis, who had joined just before Mitchell. His subsection's role was to maintain surveillance on suspected Nazi sympathizers and right-wing nationalist organisations such as the British Union of Fascists as well as German and Austrian political bodies. Mitchell assisted Francis Aiken-Sneath in investigating Sir Oswald Mosley's activities and in organising the case for his wartime detention.

=== After World War II ===
After the war Mitchell became director of F Division, and in 1953 moved to become head of D Division (counter-espionage). In May 1951 diplomats Guy Burgess and Donald Maclean had defected to Moscow, and Mitchell led the MI5 team investigating what Soviet penetration there might have been in Britain's intelligence services. He had a major role in introducing "positive vetting" for civil servants with access to highly classified information. Mitchell was the principal author of the 1955 White Paper concerning the disappearance of Burgess and Maclean, under the close supervision of Hollis. This document made no mention of Kim Philby, and led to Harold Macmillan exonerating Philby after he had been named in the House of Commons. Chapman Pincher, an investigative journalist specialising in the intelligence services, wrote of the paper "it was strewn with statements now proven to be false – as they were known to be inside MI5 at the time".

After the war Mitchell was responsible for the surveillance of fascist John Beckett. Beckett's son Francis studied the MI5 records of his family's case, including Mitchell's memoranda, when they were released in 2016. While not defending or agreeing with his father or supporting his detention, Francis Beckett said of Mitchell "the satisfaction in the covert control he exerted over other people shines through his flat prose", and that the memoranda show signs of reluctance to later give up the arbitrary power over the freedom of others that had been granted in 1940.

In 1956 Roger Hollis became director general of MI5, and appointed Mitchell to be his deputy.

=== Suspicions of Soviet penetration and the "Fluency" investigation ===
MI5's performance in counterespionage had been notably unsuccessful in the 1950s. Its own investigations had led to only one spy being caught and no Soviet defectors having been recruited. This was in stark contrast to its highly effective performance during WWII. This led to suspicions within the Secret Intelligence Service that MI5 had become infiltrated by a Soviet "mole". Suspicion fell on both Hollis and Mitchell although any evidence was highly circumstantial.

A few years later, it seemed highly likely that Kim Philby, in the SIS at the time of the Burgess–Maclean defections, had been tipped off that he was about to be confronted with conclusive evidence of his treachery, and this led to his decampment from Beirut to Moscow in 1963. A complicating factor was that Sir Dick White had been director general of MI5 between 1953 and 1956 before he became director general of the SIS in 1956.

With White's authority, Arthur S. Martin approached Hollis in early 1963, shortly after Philby defected, to get permission to investigate the possible tip-off of Philby, without naming any suspects. Hollis agreed to this if White also approved. Martin then told White that Mitchell and Hollis himself were the main suspects. White contacted Hollis but only to mention Mitchell as a suspect, and the molehunt, codenamed "Fluency", was officially started.

In September 1963, Mitchell unexpectedly took early retirement for health reasons at age 58, after 24 years service. He had announced that he would do so before he came under suspicion. But he was later interrogated in 1968, and seemingly was able to answer the charges successfully. The main suspicion then fell on Hollis and, although the matter has never been completely resolved, Christopher Andrew in his Authorized History of MI5 comes to a firm conclusion that neither were traitors. Pincher, conversely, believes that Hollis was the most likely culprit, if there was one.

== Public discussion about investigations into Hollis and Mitchell ==
In 1975 Lord Trend, the former Cabinet Secretary, was asked by the government to review the internal fluency investigation;– his Inquiry's report has never been published.

Andrew states that Harold Wilson wrote on Trend's review of the Hollis and Mitchell cases: "This is very disturbing stuff, even if concluding in 'not proven' verdicts". In 1981 Chapman Pincher claimed in his book Their Trade is Treachery that the Inquiry had cleared Mitchell and had concluded that Hollis was the "likeliest suspect". On the day of publication of Pincher's book, Prime Minister Margaret Thatcher made a statement in the House of Commons disclaiming Pincher, not mentioning Mitchell, but saying of Hollis that while the investigation "did not conclusively prove his innocence" that "Lord Trend, with whom I have discussed the matter, agreed with those who, although it was impossible to prove the negative, concluded that Sir Roger Hollis had not been an agent of the Russian intelligence service".

Peter Wright, author of Spycatcher, and a former senior MI5 officer was involved in the internal investigation with both Mitchell and Roger Hollis. Wright's suspicions had originally centred on Mitchell but eventually the evidence against Hollis appeared to be much stronger.

The accuracy of various allegations made in the book by Wright was questioned in a review of Spycatcher published by the Center for the Study of Intelligence, an in-house think tank for the CIA. While admitting (on page 42) that the book included "factual data", the document stated that it was also "filled with [unspecified] errors, exaggerations, bogus ideas, and self-inflation".

In 2010, Stephen de Mowbray who worked for MI6 until 1979, stated that Mitchell was exonerated. "We followed Mitchell all over the place ... Even after his retirement, Mitchell was still monitored. Nothing was found. Next Hollis was investigated but eventually also cleared. But somebody was doing it"

The 2014 MI5 website addresses the matter specifically, stating that the original investigation lasted from 1964 to 1971 but "came to no firm conclusions" and that Trend's report concluded "there was no evidence to show that either Hollis or Mitchell had been Soviet agents". It continues that there was a 1988 internal review which concluded the original case was "so insubstantial that it should not have been pursued".

In 2011, Pincher still considered that Hollis was a Soviet agent but that the case against Mitchell was "trivial". However, in his 1987 book Molehunt Nigel West had considered that either Hollis or Mitchell were proven to be moles but that Mitchell was the more likely candidate to have been "the betrayer". That opinion has been challenged and, in his brief 2004 Oxford Dictionary of National Biography biography of Mitchell, West does not make such a suggestion against him.

== Honours, death ==
Mitchell was awarded the OBE in 1951, and Companion of the Order of the Bath in 1957.

Long after his retirement from MI5, Mitchell died on 19 November 1984, at age 79.

== See also ==
There is a collection of 16 of Mitchell's best chess games at chessgames.com, including his exceptional win over Purdy.
