= Roger Hollis =

British intelligence officer, Director General MI5

Sir Roger Hollis KBE CB
- Born: 2 December 1905; Wells, Somerset
- Died: 26 October 1973 (aged 67); Catcott, Somerset
- Education: Worcester College, Oxford
- Occupation: Intelligence officer
- Awards: KBE, CB
- Espionage activity
- Allegiance: United Kingdom
- Service branch: MI5
- Service years: 1938–1965
- Rank: Director General of MI5

Sir Roger Henry Hollis KBE CB (2 December 1905 – 26 October 1973) was a British intelligence officer who served with MI5 from 1938 to 1965. He was Director General of MI5 from 1956 to 1965.

Some commentators, including the journalist Chapman Pincher and intelligence officer Peter Wright, suggested that Hollis was a Soviet agent. In his book The Defence of the Realm: The Authorized History of MI5 (2009), the Cambridge historian Christopher Andrew rejects this theory.

The government's official position, first stated by Margaret Thatcher, is that there was no evidence that Hollis was a traitor.

== Early years, family, and education ==
Hollis's father, the Right Reverend George Hollis, was Bishop of Taunton. His mother was the daughter of a Canon of Wells Cathedral. Hollis was educated at Clifton College, Bristol. From 1924 to the spring of 1926, he attended Worcester College, Oxford, where he read English, but left without completing his degree. At Oxford he was part of the Hypocrites' Club.

== Professional career ==
From the spring of 1926 into 1927, he was a clerk for the Standard Chartered Bank in London. In early 1927, he went to Hong Kong as a freelance journalist, then moved to Shanghai. From 1 April 1928, he worked for British American Tobacco. In 1930, he transferred to Beijing.

In June 1938, he joined MI5 F Division (Countersubversion). Many departments of MI5, including F Division, moved from London to Blenheim Palace, Oxfordshire, during World War II, due to threat of bombing. From 1953 to 1956, Hollis was MI5 Deputy Director General under Dick White, succeeding White in 1956 as Director General and remaining in that post until his retirement in 1965.

== Mole suspicions ==
=== During his life ===
After Kim Philby's flight from Beirut to Moscow in 1963, rumours began to circulate that Hollis had alerted him to his impending arrest. Hollis was criticised for not alerting John Profumo, the War Secretary in Prime Minister Harold Macmillan's Conservative government, that he might have become entangled with a Soviet spy ring through his friendship with Stephen Ward and his affair with showgirl Christine Keeler, who was introduced by Ward to Profumo. Soviet Naval Attache Eugene Ivanov was also involved with Keeler at this time, in the early 1960s, and sought to learn the date of American plans to arm nuclear warheads in West Germany, from Profumo through Keeler. Profumo had to resign in mid-1963, and the resulting scandal did much to bring the Labour Party to power in the October 1964 General Election.

During the 1950s and 1960s, a large number of MI5 operations failed in circumstances that suggested the Soviets had been tipped off. Although many such failures were subsequently blamed on the actions of such self-confessed or defected agents as Philby, Guy Burgess and Anthony Blunt, a number of failures occurred after all three had lost their access to secret information. Some in MI5 concluded the Soviets had an agent in a very senior position within the organisation. Peter Wright, Arthur S. Martin, Jane Sissmore and others became convinced that either Hollis or his deputy, Graham Mitchell, could be the only ones responsible, eventually confiding their suspicions to Dick White, director general of MI6. White instructed Martin to inform Hollis that Mitchell was a suspect, and Hollis instructed Martin (after due consideration) to keep Mitchell under surveillance. Author Nigel West implies that this was a deliberate ploy to keep tabs on both Mitchell and Hollis.

Martin eventually became so disgruntled and outspoken about Hollis's attitude toward the investigation that Hollis suspended Martin for a fortnight, and the case was turned over to Wright. Much of the investigation was centred around interviews with Anthony Blunt at that time, and Wright had amassed a sizeable amount of taped evidence from Blunt when Martin returned from suspension. After 1964, Blunt gradually confessed his double-agent role in exchange for immunity from prosecution.

Eventually the operation wound down. By then, some time after Hollis had retired, suspicion had shifted from Mitchell to Hollis. New Director General Martin Furnival Jones refused to sanction an investigation into Hollis. Mole Hunt (Chapter 3, page 45) noted that the investigative team known as FLUENCY had been disbanded before any conclusions had been reached.

=== Posthumous ===
In 1984, investigative journalist Chapman Pincher published Too Secret Too Long, a book which examined the early life of Hollis and his MI5 career drawing upon new sources and upon many interviews with retired intelligence personnel. Pincher published a revised edition in 2009. Pincher also accused Hollis of being a Soviet agent, although separate from the Cambridge Five spy ring. Pincher claims Hollis was recruited by Richard Sorge in China in the early 1930s to spy for the GRU. Evidence has been advanced to support these assertions by Pincher in his book, Treachery: Betrayals, Blunders, and Cover-ups: Six Decades of Espionage Against America and Great Britain, which is devoted to positing that Hollis was "Elli", the highly placed mole within MI5 identified by Igor Gouzenko, and operating as a Soviet agent from the 1940s until retiring from MI5. In its obituary of Pincher, The Times discredited the journalist's conspiracy theory ("Paranoia Hollisiensis") and specified that Hollis had not been a Soviet spy.

Under Furnival Jones, the higher management of MI5 expressed indignation and loss of morale about the Hollis affair. Hollis was asked to come in and clear up the allegations. Having been the director, Hollis was aware of the procedures of the interrogation and investigation. He remained calm and composed throughout, denying all allegations. Martin and Wright and the team were unable to convince anyone else in MI5 or MI6 that they were right about Hollis. Wright retired in January 1976, upon reaching age 60 and, by his own account, was enraged at being denied a pension for his 30 years of service, on highly legalistic and technical grounds. He emigrated to Tasmania, Australia, where he wrote an account of his work at MI5. Despite attempts by Margaret Thatcher's government to suppress the publication and distribution of Spycatcher, it was finally published in 1987 and eventually sold over two million copies around the world.

Wright alleges in Spycatcher that Gouzenko, who had worked for the GRU, himself deduced later that his interviewer might have been a Soviet double agent and was probably afraid that he might recognise him from case photos that Gouzenko might have seen in KGB or GRU files, hence the disguise. Gouzenko also admitted that he, being a lower level clerk, had no access to such files.

The accuracy of various allegations made in the book by Wright was questioned in a review of Spycatcher published by the Center for the Study of Intelligence, an in-house think tank for the CIA. While admitting that the book included "factual data", the document stated that it was also "filled with [unspecified] errors, exaggerations, bogus ideas, and self-inflation". The review added that "Gen. Oleg Kalugin, former Chief of Counterintelligence" had confirmed to the author that Hollis had not worked for the KGB.

Peter Wright had given a televised interview in 1984 during the dispute with Thatcher's government. Following the interview, in July 1984, Martin wrote a letter to The Times. In it, he stated that while Wright exaggerated the certainty with which they regarded Hollis's guilt, Wright was justified in saying that Hollis was the most likely candidate, for the reasons Wright had cited. In her 2001 autobiography, Christine Keeler (John Profumo's mistress), alleged, without supporting evidence, that Hollis and Stephen Ward were part of a spy ring with Sir Anthony Blunt. Ward had committed suicide on 3 August 1963 as the Profumo scandal progressed. In Keeler's updated book, Secrets and Lies, published in 2012, Keeler stated she saw Hollis visiting Ward five times at the house she shared with Ward.

In his book, The Defence of the Realm: The Authorized History of MI5, a Cambridge professor, Christopher Andrew, used access to 400,000 MI5 files to compile an official history of the service. He claims he has proved conclusively that Hollis was not a double agent and that Wright was misguided at best.

Paul Monk, an Australian former senior intelligence analyst and author of the argument maps used in the Institute of World Politics panel, provides a counterpoint to the Authorized History. He believes Andrew dismisses Wright's claims almost ad hominem but fails to address the specific points made by Pincher in his final (2009) book on the subject. He describes Andrew's description of Hollis's background as – in light of the allegations made against him – "insouciant". Monk feels that as Andrew is arguing that Hollis is innocent, he should have given Hollis the vetting he did not receive when he entered MI5, particularly in light of Hollis's relationships with confirmed Soviet assets, regardless of whether he was one of them. Monk discusses at length the flaws of the book, for example, the notion that Leo Long was definitely ELLI. This is supposedly disproved by KGB archives – Long is thought to be RALPH – and solely supported by the later questioned testimony of Gordievsky. He surmises with the following "Christopher Andrew treads a well-worn path in failing utterly to address that case, much less refute it once and for all." In the 2009 ITV programme, Inside MI5: The Real Spooks, Oleg Gordievsky recounted how he saw the head of the British section of the KGB expressing surprise at the allegations that he read in a British newspaper about Hollis being a KGB agent, saying "Why is it they are speaking about Roger Hollis, such nonsense, can't understand it, it must be some special English trick directed against us."

In 2010, Stephen de Mowbray who worked for MI6 until 1979, stated that both Hollis and Mitchell had been exonerated. "We followed Mitchell all over the place ... Nothing was found. Next Hollis was investigated but eventually also cleared. There were suspicions with both of them. There are not suspicions now. But somebody was doing it."

On 21 April 2015, the Institute of World Politics held a panel debating whether or not Hollis was a mole. They published a report and chronology. One panel member, later wrote that "our panel solved nothing" perhaps because "facts have gradually blurred with supposition and theory."

Oleg Gordievsky, a former KGB head of station in London who defected to Britain in 1985, had said that Hollis was innocent and said of Wright's book, "there was a lot of fantasy in it and malicious speculation".

The official MI5 website denies that Hollis was a Soviet agent, adding: "Hollis' non-involvement with the Soviets was confirmed in the 1980s by a senior KGB defector, Oleg Gordievsky. He has described how the Soviets themselves were baffled by the allegations against Hollis."

== Family ==
Hollis married Evelyn Swayne on 17 July 1937 at Wells Cathedral, with his father performing the ceremony. She was the daughter of a solicitor from Burnham-on-Sea in Somerset. The couple had one son, Adrian Hollis.

Hollis's son, Adrian (1940–2013), was a classical scholar and Grandmaster of correspondence chess, and was British Correspondence Chess Champion in 1966, 1967 and 1971. Philosopher Martin Hollis (1938–1998) was his nephew. His elder brother, Christopher Hollis (1902–1977), was a Conservative MP for Devizes from 1945 to 1955. His nephew, Rt Rev Crispian Hollis, a Catholic convert, is the Bishop Emeritus of Portsmouth.

== Honours ==
Hollis was appointed Officer of the Order of the British Empire (OBE) in the 1946 Birthday Honours, Companion of the Order of the Bath (CB) in the 1956 New Year Honours, knighted as a Knight Bachelor in the 1960 New Year Honours, and promoted to Knight Commander of the Order of the British Empire (KBE) in the 1966 New Year Honours.

== Sources ==
- Keeler, Christine (2012). Secrets and Lies. John Blake Publishing. ISBN 978-1843587552.
- Knightley, Phillip; Kennedy, Caroline (1987). An Affair of State: The Profumo Case and the Framing of Stephen Ward. London: Jonathan Cape. ISBN 978-0-224-02347-4.
- Pincher, Chapman (1984). Too Secret Too Long. Smithmark Publishing. ISBN 978-9997626370.
- Pincher, Chapman (2009). Treachery: Betrayals, Blunders, and Cover-ups: Six Decades of Espionage Against America and Great Britain. New York: Random House. ISBN 978-1-4000-6807-4.
- Wright, Peter (1987). Spycatcher. New York and London: Viking Penguin Inc. ISBN 978-0440201328.

Government offices
Preceded by Sir Dick White	Director General of MI5; 1956–1965	Succeeded by Sir Martin Furnival Jones
