= The Defence of the Realm =

2009 nonfiction book by Christopher Andrew

- Author: Christopher Andrew
- Language: English
- Genre: Non-fiction
- Publisher: Allen Lane
- Publication date: 5 October 2009
- Publication place: United Kingdom
- Media type: Print (hardback)
- Pages: 1032 pp
- ISBN: 0-7139-9885-7

The Defence of the Realm: The Authorized History of MI5, published in the United States as Defend the Realm, is an authorised history of the British Security Service (MI5), written by historian Christopher Andrew. Andrew was commissioned in December 2002 to write the history for MI5's 100th anniversary in 2009. He was given "virtually unrestricted access" to much of MI5's files, and "no restriction" on whatever conclusions he decided to draw from them. The book reported, amongst other things, that MI5 kept a file (under a pseudonym) on Prime Minister Harold Wilson (as revealed by Peter Wright decades before in Spycatcher), as well as noting how many of Wilson's MP's were spying for the Soviet bloc. The book's title was derived from MI5's Latin motto, Regnum Defende. Historian Keith Jeffery was commissioned to write a similar authorised history of the Secret Intelligence Service (MI6) for release in 2010.

== Reception ==
The book received generally positive reviews from major newspapers. The Daily Telegraph called it "magisterial, authoritative, balanced, readable ... full of wry humour and with an eye for the absurd", declaring that "MI5 could not have wanted a better historian than him. This book is unlikely to be surpassed for another 100 years". More tempered praise came from The Sunday Times, where Max Hastings found the account "weighty, measured and compelling", regretting only a bit of occasional overenthusiasm on the part of the author and a lack of reflection on "the relationship between the service, ministers and the public".

Ben Macintyre reviewed Defend the Realm for The New York Times Book Review, calling it "not only a work of meticulous scholarship but also a series of riveting and true spy stories", though recognising that such an account on a secretive organisation will necessarily be incomplete in certain areas. The Los Angeles Times found it "as complete and thorough as such a history may be and as engrossing as any spy novel".

The book was criticised in Quadrant magazine in an article by Paul Monk for almost non-existent use of meaningful citation, bias in favour of MI5's "official" line, and for glossing over the issue of whether Roger Hollis was a Soviet agent.

== Editions ==
=== United Kingdom ===
- The Defence of the Realm: The Authorized History of MI5. Allen Lane. 2009. ISBN 978-0-7139-9885-6. (hardcover)
- The Defence of the Realm: The Authorized History of MI5. Penguin. 2010. ISBN 978-0-14-102330-4. (paperback)

=== United States ===
- Defend the Realm: The Authorized History of MI5. Knopf. 2009. ISBN 978-0-307-26363-6. (hardcover)
- Defend the Realm: The Authorized History of MI5. Vintage. 2010. ISBN 978-0-307-27581-3. (paperback)
