= Lee Johnson (art historian) =

Professor Lee Frederick Johnson (7 September 1924 – 6 July 2006) was an art historian and specialist in the works of the French nineteenth-century painter Eugène Delacroix.

== Early life and scholarship ==
Born in 1924 in London, Johnson emigrated to the US in 1940 and served with the US Army in the Pacific. Between 1952 and 1958 he was a student at the Courtauld Institute of Art. During this period, he fortuitously discovered four unattributed Delacroix decorative paintings in the town house of François-Joseph Talma in Paris.

== Publications ==
In 1954 Johnson wrote a five-page piece in The Burlington Magazine about the exhibitions in London and Dublin of Géricault's The Raft of the Medusa. This was the first of his published works. He completed his doctoral thesis in 1958 under the supervision of Anthony Blunt, and this thesis was to be the basis of his first book, Delacroix, published in 1963—the centenary of the artist's death. By this time he had been made a lecturer at the Department of Fine Art, Toronto, where he was appointed a professor in 1973.

== Exhibition curator ==
The centenary of Delacroix's death was the occasion of a 1962–63 exhibition at the Art Gallery of Toronto (renamed in 1966 as the Art Gallery of Ontario) which Johnson curated and catalogued. The director of the gallery noted in the preface that the catalogue contained a "considerable amount of material which not only appears for the first time but also corrects previous errors." He went on to curate and catalogue the Delacroix exhibition at the Edinburgh Festival of 1964 where 201 works were displayed.

== The Catalogue ==
Johnson's Catalogue of the works of Delacroix is one of his most significant contributions to art scholarship. The first volume of this catalogue was released in 1981, and the final supplement was released in 2002. The entire catalogue consists of six large books, with four supplements. The catalogue was highly acclaimed, two of the volumes winning the Mitchell Prize for the History of Art.

== Retirement and legacy ==
After having worked extensively on Delacroix, and to a lesser degree on Géricault, Bonington and Anglo-French artistic links in the 1820s, Johnson retired in 1984. He was appointed Chevalier de la Légion d'Honneur in 2000. He had by this time written a number of scholarly books, and his writing had appeared in journals including 45 articles between 1954 and 2003 in The Burlington Magazine, as well as other articles in Apollo, The Journal of the Warburg and Courtauld Institutes, The Art Bulletin, Gazette des Beaux-Arts, Revue du Louvre, Bulletin de la Société de l'Histoire de l'Art Français and The J. Paul Getty Museum Journal. Many of these articles contained new or clarificatory information.

University of Glasgow art historian Ronald Pickvance, commenting on the work of Lee Johnson, said "The way we comprehend Delacroix will never be the same because of the contribution he has made."
