= John Cairncross =

British intelligence officer and Soviet spy (1913–1995)

- Born: 25 July 1913; Lesmahagow, Lanarkshire, Scotland
- Died: 8 October 1995 (aged 82); Herefordshire, England
- Education: University of Glasgow; University of Paris; Trinity College, Cambridge
- Spouses: Gabriella Oppenheim (m. 1951; died 1995) Gayle Brinkerhoff (m. 1995)
- Espionage activity
- Allegiance: Soviet Union
- Service branch: Foreign Office; The Government Code and Cypher School, Bletchley Park
- Codename: Liszt

John Cairncross (25 July 1913 – 8 October 1995) was a British civil servant who became an intelligence officer and spy during the Second World War. As a Soviet double agent, he passed to the Soviet Union the raw Tunny decryptions that may have influenced the Battle of Kursk. He was alleged to be the fifth member of the Cambridge Five. He was also notable as a translator, literary scholar and writer of non-fiction.

The most significant aspect of his work was helping the Soviets defeat the Germans in battle during the Second World War; he may also have told Moscow that the US was developing an atomic bomb. Cairncross confessed in secret to MI5's Arthur S. Martin in 1964 and gave a limited confession to two journalists from The Sunday Times in December 1979. He was never prosecuted for his espionage activities.

According to The Washington Post, the suggestion that John Cairncross was the "fifth man" of the Cambridge ring was not confirmed until 1990, by Soviet double-agent Oleg Gordievsky. This was re-confirmed by former KGB agent Yuri Modin's book published in 1994, My Five Cambridge Friends Burgess, Maclean, Philby, Blunt, and Cairncross by Their KGB Controller.

== Childhood and education ==
Cairncross was born at Pine Cottage, Lesmahagow, in Lanarkshire, the youngest of four girls and four boys, of Elizabeth Andrew Wishart (1875–1958), a primary schoolteacher, and Alexander Kirkland Cairncross (1865–1947), an ironmongery manager. His three brothers became professors, one of whom was the economist Sir Alexander Kirkland Cairncross (a.k.a. Alec Cairncross). The journalist Frances Cairncross is his niece.

Cairncross grew up in Lesmahagow, a small town on the edge of moorland, near Lanark in the Central Belt of Scotland, and was educated at Lesmahagow Higher Grade School (where his name appears as the 1928 winner of the Dux prize), Hamilton Academy, the University of Glasgow, the Sorbonne and Trinity College, Cambridge. Cairncross spent two years at Glasgow studying Modern Languages before acquiring a licence-ès-lettres from the Sorbonne in Paris, which enabled him to win a Cambridge scholarship and also to bypass the first year of the Modern and Medieval Languages Tripos. Viewed as a savant while at Cambridge – his college's undergraduate magazine remarked that he had the ability to learn "a new language every fortnight" – he graduated with first-class honours in French and German in 1936.

Christopher Andrew and Oleg Gordievsky believe Cairncross to have been an "open communist" when he came up to Cambridge in autumn 1934. According to his biographer, Geoff Andrews, he joined the Communist Party of Great Britain (CPGB) soon afterwards, at a time when the republican cause in the Spanish Civil War received great international sympathy. And yet his brother Alec, who was also at Cambridge until 1935, did not recall any political activity back then, commenting in addition that John "was a prickly young man, who was difficult to argue with and resented things rather easily". Certainly, Cairncross's unsympathetic personality may have frustrated any chance he had of forming a political connection with his French literature supervisor at Trinity, Anthony Blunt, who by then was a convinced Marxist and was soon to become a talent-spotter for the Comintern. "I didn't like him," Cairncross later remarked of Blunt, "and he didn't like me." He developed a more amiable relationship with Guy Burgess, the other member of the Cambridge Five aside from Blunt whom he knew personally at university, but claimed decades later not to have even known that Burgess was a communist at that time. Indeed, in Cairncross's autobiography he describes his political orientation at Cambridge as discreetly and unobtrusively anti-Nazi rather than overtly left-wing, finding communist doctrine unrealistic and its policies too "anti-employer [and] pro-worker". He also insists in his book that he had no inkling of any "KGB operations" going on at the university while he was there.

== Early professional career and recruitment as a spy ==
After graduating, Cairncross took the British Civil Service exam and won first place in both the "home civil service" and the "foreign office and diplomatic service" competitions. An article in the Glasgow Herald on 29 September 1936 noted that Cairncross had scored an "outstanding double success of being placed 1st in the Home List and 1st in the competition for the Foreign Office and the Diplomatic Service" and that he had been placed fifth in the University of Glasgow bursary competition of 1930 and was also a Scholar and Bell Exhibitioner at Trinity College, Cambridge. Andrew and Gordievsky later revealed that in the Foreign Office entrance exam Cairncross was one hundred marks ahead of the next candidate, who was a fellow of All Souls.

Cairncross worked initially in the Foreign Office before transferring to the Treasury and then the Cabinet Office, where he worked as a private secretary to Lord Hankey, the Chancellor of the Duchy of Lancaster. In 1937, while working at the Foreign Office, he was recruited as a spy for the Soviets. Initial attempts to bring him on side were made by Burgess and Blunt on the orders of Arnold Deutsch, the Soviet Union's leading spymaster in Britain, but without success. Deutsch then turned to James Klugmann of the Communist Party of Great Britain, an acquaintance of Cairncross at Cambridge and a fellow graduate in modern languages, who managed to 'bounce' Cairncross into becoming a spy by arranging to meet him in Regent's Park and then slipping away once Deutsch appeared from behind a tree. According to Richard Davenport-Hines, Cairncross was "largely inactive" as a Soviet agent until after the collapse of the Molotov-Ribbentrop Pact in 1941.

== Second World War ==
In 1942 and 1943 Cairncross worked at the Government Code and Cypher School signals intelligence agency, abbreviated GC&CS, at Bletchley Park in Hut 3, on Ultra ciphers. He had access to communications of the German military and intelligence services. In June 1943, he left Bletchley Park for a job in MI6.

=== Government Code and Cypher School, Bletchley Park ===
Cairncross passed decrypted documents through secret channels to the Soviet Union. Codenamed Liszt by the Russians because of his love of music, Cairncross had been instructed to get into Bletchley Park, known to the KGB as Kurort.

From 1942, the Oberkommando der Wehrmacht (German Armed Forces High Command), or OKW, communicated with Army group commanders in the field using a machine that the British codenamed Tunny. Cairncross smuggled Tunny decrypts due to be destroyed out of Hut 3 in his trousers, transferring them to his bag at the railway station before going to meet his NKVD contact in London, Anatoli Gorsky. The Soviets were particularly interested in traffic between Berlin–Pskov, Berlin–Helsinki, Berlin–Lisbon, Trebizond–Istanbul, Berlin–Bucharest, and Kirkenes–Oslo. They were also interested in British efforts to decipher Soviet ciphers and in the joint effort by German and Japanese cipher experts to decipher Soviet signals including military ones, which the combined German–Japanese effort failed to achieve with the Soviet diplomatic ciphers.

The raw transcripts decrypted by Colossus were passed to intelligence officers at Bletchley Park, who created reports based on this material by disguising its origin as signals traffic. By providing verbatim transcripts, Cairncross showed the Soviets that the British were breaking German ciphers. It was considered to be in the British interest for the Soviet Union to be made aware of German military plans, but not of how they were obtained. The Lubianka originally suspected a "trap" because of the amount of high-grade material supplied, but it was acted on and found to be accurate. Because of "defective and leaky" internal security in the Soviet Union, "Cairncross jeopardised the entire Bletchley Park operation […] for the sake of his ideological beliefs". Information based on decrypts was passed to the Soviets through official channels as from Agent "Boniface"; Stalin distrusted unsourced intelligence presented to him by Britain and the United States.

==== Operation Citadel ====
Operation Citadel was the codename given by Nazi Germany to their offensive which led to the Battle of Kursk. After being defeated at Kursk, the Wehrmacht retreated steadily until Berlin was taken. Tunny decrypts (transcripts) gave the British advance intelligence about Operation Citadel. Almost all raw transcripts were destroyed at the end of the war but a surviving transcript dated 25 April 1943 from Army Group South signed by Maximilian von Weichs shows the high level of detail available to British intelligence officers. Analysts deduced the northern and southern attack routes, and a report based on this transcript was passed through official channels to Stalin. During this period, Cairncross provided a second, clandestine channel, supplying raw Tunny transcripts directly.

==== Tito and the Yugoslav partisans ====
Axis occupation forces in Yugoslavia used radio communication extensively. In addition to German Abwehr, Sicherheitsdienst (SD), Luftwaffe, naval, railway, Army group and OKW messages, GC&CS intercepted and decrypted Yugoslav partisan communications with Comintern and with the Soviet Union. Cairncross first in Hut 3, then later at MI6 HQ, had access to raw decrypts. Communications from Comintern to Tito supplying some of this intelligence, strongly suggest that he passed decrypts concerning Yugoslavia to the KGB.

== Work as a spy ==
Between 1941 and 1945, Cairncross supplied the Soviets with 5,832 documents, according to Russian archives. In 1944, Cairncross joined MI6, the foreign intelligence service. In Section V, the counter-intelligence section, Cairncross produced under the direction of Kim Philby an order of battle of the SS. Cairncross later suggested that he was unaware of Philby's connections with the Russians. In October 1944, he wrote to his Soviet leaders in foreign intelligence "I am delighted that our friends found my help worthy of attention, and I am proud that I contributed something to the victory, which led to the almost complete cleansing of the Soviet land from the invaders". In March 1945, he was awarded a £1,000 per year pension but he refused to accept it.

Yuri Modin, the Russian MGB (later KGB) Controller in London, claims that Cairncross gave him details of nuclear arms to be stationed with NATO in West Germany. He gives no date for this message. Cairncross was at the Ministry of Supply in 1951 and NATO was established in April 1949. There was no such plan at this time and it was only much later that NATO obtained tactical nuclear weapons under US control in Germany. This appears to have been a disinformation exercise, although it is not clear whether Cairncross, whose loyalty was aready under suspicion, was aware that the documents he passed to Modin had been falsified in order to deceive Moscow.

In September 1951, he was questioned by British counterintelligence about his relationship with Maclean and the Communist Party. Cairncross had been trained by the Soviets on how to behave during a counterintelligence interrogation. On 23 October 1951, Cairncross informed his Soviet controller that he had merely explained to the interrogator that he did not hide his membership with the party and that he would merely greet Maclean when he worked at the Ministry of Foreign Affairs but did not maintain any contact with him after graduation. For security, the residence (or rezidentura, the local Soviet intelligence station) temporarily stopped contact with him, allowed him to continue to report monthly his situation with appropriate signals, and planned a follow-up meeting on 23 January 1952. The Soviets developed an exfiltration plan for Cairncross including funds, documents, and communication methods while living in other countries. Cairncross did not signal his controller until an early March 1952 meeting during which Cairncross stated that he had been interrogated again. The residency did not have any more contact with Cairncross and instructed Kim Philby to determine Cairncross's whereabouts. Philby could not determine the whereabouts of Cairncross.

Cairncross admitted to some impropriety in 1951 after MI5 found papers in Guy Burgess's flat with a handwritten note from him, after Burgess's flight to Moscow. This included a 15-page report about international affairs and policy obtained from nine officials. Cairncross claimed that this was the only document that he had ever provided to Burgess. No evidence of his spying for the Soviets during the war was produced. The official report concluded that the interrogations in 1951 and 1952 had "failed to produce evidence on which a charge of espionage could be based". Philby had also informed the residency of this.

Evidence from the Soviet archives strongly indicates that Cairncross supplied to his Soviet handlers early information about British intentions to develop an atomic weapons programme. In September 1940 Cairncross was assigned to the office of Maurice Hankey, a minister without portfolio who sat on numerous scientific committees including the MAUD Committee and later the Tube Alloys Consultative Committee. While this did not include technical data, it provided the Soviet Union evidence that the British were considering the production of atomic weapons. He was never prosecuted, which later led to charges that the government engaged in a conspiracy to cover up his role.

The identity of the infamous 'fifth man' in the Cambridge Five remained a mystery outside intelligence circles until 1990, when KGB defector Oleg Gordievsky confirmed Cairncross publicly. Cairncross worked independently of the other four and did not share their upper-middle-class backgrounds or tastes. Although he knew Anthony Blunt at Cambridge, Guy Burgess socially (and had a dislike of both of them), Donald Maclean from the Foreign Office and Kim Philby from MI6, he claimed not to have been aware that they were also passing secrets to the Russians.

Cairncross had resigned from the civil service in late 1952 and forfeited his pension. In 1964, he admitted to interrogator Arthur Martin that he had spied for the Soviets. In December 1979, Cairncross was approached by journalist Barrie Penrose and confessed to him. The news was widely publicized leading many to surmise that he was in fact the "fifth man", a designation which would be confirmed in 1989 by Gordievsky, who had defected to Britain.

While Cairncross is now widely considered to be the "fifth man", a few sources previously believed that the designation should go to Victor Rothschild, 3rd Baron Rothschild. In his 1994 book The Fifth Man, Roland Perry asserted this claim. After the book was published, former KGB controller Yuri Modin denied ever having named Rothschild as "any kind of Soviet agent". Modin's own book's title clarifies the name of the fifth man: My Five Cambridge Friends: Burgess, Maclean, Philby, Blunt, and Cairncross.

Cairncross did not view himself as one of the Cambridge Five, insisting that the information he sent to Moscow was not harmful to Britain and that he had remained loyal to his homeland. He believed that he had been doing a favour to an ally who was being refused information by a "right-wing clique", according to one news item. His link to the Cambridge ring is tenuous since his truly valuable spy work had concluded by the end of the war. A review of the 2019 book by Chris Smith, The Last Cambridge Spy: John Cairncross, Bletchley Park Codebreaker and Soviet Double Agent, proposes this view. The review adds that unlike the other four, described as "privileged" and as "haute bourgeois" by another book (A Spy Named Orphan: The Enigma of Donald Maclean), he was "lower middle class" with a heavy Scottish accent. "It was mere happenstance that he was at Cambridge with the others".

== Later life ==
At the end of the war, Cairncross joined the Treasury; he claimed that he ceased working for the MGB (later to become the KGB). KGB reports, published subsequently, contradict this. After his first confession (1952), Cairncross lost his civil service job and was penniless and unemployed. With some financial assistance from his previous handler, Modin, he moved to the US, where he taught at universities in Chicago and as a lecturer in Romance Languages at Case Western Reserve University in Cleveland, Ohio. Cairncross was an expert on French authors and translated the works of many 17th century French poets and dramatists such as Jean Racine, Jean de La Fontaine and Pierre Corneille, as well as writing three of his own books, Molière bourgeois et libertin, New Light on Molière and After Polygamy was Made a Sin.

This career was ended following further investigation into Cairncross by MI5 investigative officer Arthur S. Martin. After Philby fled to Moscow in 1963, Martin reopened the files to hunt for the fourth and fifth men in 1964. To Martin's surprise, Cairncross made a full confession. Martin also received a denunciation which led to Blunt's confession. Despite his confession to Martin, Cairncross was never prosecuted for his espionage activities. The confession, conducted in Cleveland, Ohio, was not made under police caution and would therefore have been inadmissible in court. Despite MI5 enquiries regarding extradition, the FBI did not view Cairncross as a danger to US security and had no grounds to deport him to Britain. MI5 asked Cairncross if he would be willing to voluntarily return to Britain to provide his confession again, this time under caution. He declined.

In 1967, Cairncross moved to Rome, where he worked for the United Nations Food and Agriculture Organization as a translator, also taking on work for the Research Office of Banca Nazionale del Lavoro (BNL), Banca d'Italia and IMI. In 1970, he moved to France and lived in Provence. In the BNL, a young economist engaged with international scenarios analysis (the Iran–Iraq War of 1980–1988, petroleum's strategic routes in the Middle East and Far East) reported a strong and unusual interest by Cairncross in the bank's role in that area. During his time in Rome, his secret finally reached the public. In December 1979, in the wake of the Blunt scandal, the former civil servant Jock Colville (who attended Trinity at the same time as Cairncross) tipped off Sunday Times journalist, Barrie Penrose, that there had been another spy in the Foreign Office at the same time as Donald Maclean. After searching the Foreign Office lists, Penrose concluded that Cairncross was that spy and confronted him.

Cairncross's third confession became front-page news. In 1981, Prime Minister Margaret Thatcher informed parliament that Cairncross was a Soviet agent and was living with his wife in the west of England while he wrote his memoirs. His status as the "fifth man" was established in 1990 by Oleg Gordievsky, the KGB defector. Cairncross retired to the south of France until 1995 when he returned to Britain and married American opera singer Gayle Brinkerhoff, daughter of John Brinkerhoff. This was one month after the death of his first wife, Gabriella Oppenheim, whom he had married in 1951. Later that year he died after suffering a stroke, at the age of 82. Unlike many other spies, Cairncross was never charged with criminally passing information to Moscow. His only imprisonment was in Rome, after being convicted of charges involving currency.

Cairncross's autobiography, The Enigma Spy, was published in 1997. In 2001, writer Rupert Allason lost a court case in which he claimed to have ghostwritten The Enigma Spy in return for copyright and 50% of the book proceeds. According to the BBC, "John Cairncross denied both that he was the supposed 'fifth man' and that such a person had ever existed. Critics at the time viewed this book as a last attempt to clear his name, though few appear to have been convinced".

Cairncross corresponded with novelist Graham Greene for forty years and that correspondence is held by the John J. Burns Library, at Boston College.

== Cultural representations ==
Cairncross is depicted in part three of the 2003 BBC TV series Cambridge Spies, where he appears reluctant to continue passing Bletchley Park data to the Russians for fear that the Red Army was heavily penetrated by Abwehr (German intelligence) and by Eastern Front military intelligence under General Gehlen. Anthony Blunt is depicted in the drama as pressuring him with threats.

Cairncross appears as a cryptographer at Bletchley Park in the 2014 film The Imitation Game, played by Allen Leech. He is portrayed as an unwitting double agent being used as a back-channel by MI6 to pass information to the Soviets that Churchill is too cautious to provide; no historical basis for this is provided. Historians, and the spy's own autobiography, have confirmed that Cairncross was spying for the Soviets because of his own views, and that this was not discovered by MI6 until long after the end of the war.

== Awards ==
- Order of the Red Banner for his obtaining information about German plans and operations on the Soviet-German front during World War II.

== Bibliography ==
=== Written ===
- New Light on Molière: Tartuffe, Elomire Hypocondre (Librairie Droz, 1956)
- By a lonely sea; translations and poems (Hong Kong University Press 1959) OCLC 3261733
- Molière bourgeois et libertin (Nizet, 1963)
- After Polygamy Was Made a Sin: The Social History of Christian Polygamy (Routledge, 1974)
- Things to come: the world food crisis, the way out (Food and Agricultural Organization of the United Nations, 1974).
- An Approach to Food and Population Planning (Food and Agricultural Organization of the United Nations, 1978)
- Population and Agriculture in the Developing Countries (Food and Agricultural Organization of the United Nations, 1980).
- La Fontaine Fables, And Other Poems (Colin Smythe, 1982)
- L'Humanité de Molière (Nizet, 1988)
- The Enigma Spy: An Autobiography (Century, 1997)

=== Translated ===
- Iphigenia; Phaedra; Athaliah (Racine, Penguin Classics, 1963)
- Andromache; Britannicus; Berenice (Racine, Penguin Classics, 1967)
- The Cid, Cinna, The Theatrical Illusion (Corneille, Penguin Classics, 1975)
- Polyeuctus, The Liar, The Nicomedes (Corneille, Penguin Classics, 1980)
- La Fontaine Fables and Other Poems (La Fontaine, Colin Smythe, 1982)
