= Arthur S. Martin =

British intelligence officer

Arthur S. Martin (died 1 February 1996) was a member of the British intelligence community and a primary investigator in the spy scandals in the post-war era.

== Biography ==
Martin became head of the D1 Section of D Branch (Investigations) of the Security Service (henceforth MI5) in 1960, and worked with Peter Wright on various investigations, including those into Roger Hollis and Anthony Blunt. These events are described in detail in Nigel West's Molehunt and Peter Wright's Spycatcher.

In 1964, Michael Straight admitted to Arthur Martin and the U.S. Federal Bureau of Investigation (FBI) that Anthony Blunt had recruited him in the mid-1930s, while both were at Cambridge University. Straight was an American who had been at Cambridge with several of the Cambridge spies. John Cairncross, alleged by many to be "The Fifth Man", also admitted to Martin that he was an associate of Blunt and that he had passed papers to the Soviet government. Martin set up a meeting with Blunt on 23 April 1964. At that meeting, Blunt admitted that he had worked for the Soviet government. Blunt was later interrogated by Peter Wright.

In 1964, Labour leader Harold Wilson became Prime Minister of the United Kingdom. Prior to the election, the FBI told MI5 they had discovered a KGB or GRU mole working in MI5, while MI5 had been trying to recruit Wilson's campaign manager, George Gaunt, to spy on Wilson. After Blunt confessed, it was clear that his position and his social and political connections posed a serious threat to the credibility of MI5. Compounding this was that MI5 had been informed of the presence of a mole ten years earlier, but had not responded appropriately. The Director General during this time, Roger Hollis, said that he felt Wilson's government would use this information against MI5 if the incoming government found out. Hollis and Martin decided to engage in a cover-up. They offered Anthony Blunt immunity instead, and he confessed when interviewed by Martin. This cover-up was also confirmed by Peter Wright. Later, when Hollis and his deputy, Graham Mitchell, fell under suspicion of being GRU moles, Wilson was not informed.

After retiring from the intelligence service (MI6) in 1970, Martin was a member of the Clerks Department in the House of Commons. He died on 1 February 1996.

== Sources ==
- West, Nigel (1987). "Mole Hunt". Weidenfeld & Nicolson, London
- Wright, Peter (1987). Spycatcher. Viking Penguin Inc., New York and London
