= Stephen de Mowbray =

Stephen de Mowbray (15 August 1925 – 4 October 2016) was a counterintelligence officer in Britain's Secret Intelligence Service (MI6).

== Early life ==
He was born at Lymington on 15 August 1925, the son of Ralph de Mowbray, a surgeon, and was educated at Hordle House School, Milford on Sea, Hampshire (later subsumed into Walhampton School near Lymington) during 1934-1938, followed by Winchester. After serving in the Fleet Air Arm in World War II, he studied for a degree in Politics, Philosophy and Economics (PPE) at New College, Oxford. He was expected to collect a First, but left with a Second (attributed to "exam nerves"). His tutor, the polymath Isaiah Berlin, suggested that he become "a spy" (intelligence officer), because he would find the Foreign Office "too conventional".

== Career ==
In 1950, de Mowbray joined the Secret Intelligence Service, MI6, at first in the Economic Section under George Kennedy Young, later serving variously in Baghdad, Montevideo, and Washington DC. He retired in 1979.

He was a champion of the controversial Soviet defector known as Anatoly Golitsyn.

In 2010, de Mowbray was interviewed by the BBC. He stated that both Roger Hollis and Graham Russell Mitchell, suspected Soviet moles in MI5, were exonerated. "We followed Mitchell all over the place ... Even after his retirement, Mitchell was still monitored. Nothing was found. Next Hollis was investigated but eventually also cleared. But somebody was doing it"

He married twice, firstly to Tamsin Giles, daughter of yachtsman Laurent Giles, and secondly to banker Patricia White.
