= Joseph Ball (British public servant) =

British soldier and lawyer

Sir George Joseph Ball, KBE (1885–1961) was a British barrister, intelligence officer, political operator, government administrator, and industrialist.

== Early years ==
George Joseph Ball originally trained as a barrister and was a member of Gray's Inn.

== MI5 ==
Ball was recruited into MI5 in 1915, after the outbreak of World War I. He served in key operational roles with MI5 until 1927, and was believed to have played a significant role in the creation of the forged Zinoviev letter in 1924, an episode which led to the defeat of the Labour Party government headed by Ramsay MacDonald.

== Conservative Party administrator ==
Ball was a 'fervent political supporter' of the Conservative Party. From his work with MI5, Ball came to the attention of Conservative Party leadership, and was recruited in 1927 to run the Propaganda Department at Conservative Party Central Office. In 1930, he moved to head the Conservative Research Department, staying in that role until 1939, when World War II began. Among the young people associated with him during the 1930s were Guy Burgess and Graham Russell Mitchell. Ball's group infiltrated the Labour Party.

He was knighted in the 1936 New Year Honours for political and public services.

== Political operator ==
During the 1930s, and into the early years of World War II, he developed and coordinated many links among Britons who supported Nazi Germany, and arranged back channels to key leadership figures in the Third Reich, as well as with Fascist Italy. He also was involved with illegal and secret funding operations, including those of Honours trafficker Maundy Gregory; money from this operation helped fund Neville Chamberlain's appeasement policy; among wealthy figures apparently involved was the gold-mining magnate Sir Harry Oakes.

== World War II ==
With the outbreak of World War II, he was hired into the Ministry of Information, being placed in charge of films, but was quickly ousted from that position through film industry pressure.

For several years a strong backer and close associate of the Prime Minister Neville Chamberlain, who came to power in 1937 following the resignation of Stanley Baldwin, Ball had worked from the mid-1930s to secretly undermine anti-Nazi Conservatives, including Winston Churchill, as well as figures in the Liberal and Labour Parties who opposed far-right totalitarian regimes in Europe. Ball was placed by Chamberlain as Deputy of the Security Executive, a powerful position which put him above MI5 and MI6, just as Chamberlain resigned as prime minister in May 1940, being replaced by Churchill. Ball suffered badly from Chamberlain's fall and death later in 1940; he wound up serving in that Security Executive position for two years, until 1942.

From the mid-1930s into the early 1940s, Ball played a key role in secret direction and control of the weekly newspaper Truth, a pro-fascist publication. This paper attacked Leslie Hore-Belisha, the only Jewish cabinet minister, forcing his resignation in 1940.

== Later years, legacy ==
In 1948 Ball was appointed a director of Consolidated Gold Fields. He later joined the South African and Rhodesian mining group Lonrho, which had been founded in 1909. He assumed a leadership role, and brought in Tiny Rowland in 1961, shortly before his own death, to run that company.

Ball was a skilled fly fisherman, who engaged in debate over optimal fishing techniques.

Although Ball made efforts to destroy the papers at Conservative Central Office outlining his own role there, as well as his personal papers; some papers have survived, and have been housed at the Bodleian Library at Oxford University since August 2000. Since 1990, historians and writers have increased the amount of published material available on Ball's life and career.

The character "Joseph Balcombe", from the 2009 film Glorious 39, by Stephen Poliakoff, is based upon Ball; the role was played by actor Jeremy Northam.
