= Anthony Blunt =

British art historian and Soviet spy (1907–1983)

- Born: Anthony Frederick Blunt; 26 September 1907; Bournemouth, Hampshire, England
- Died: 26 March 1983 (aged 75); Westminster, London, England
- Burial place: Putney Vale Cemetery and Crematorium, London, England
- Education: Trinity College, Cambridge
- Occupations: Art historian, professor, writer, spy
- Awards: KCVO, revoked in 1979
- Espionage activity
- Allegiance: Soviet Union
- Codenames: Tony; Johnson; Yan

Anthony Frederick Blunt (26 September 1907 – 26 March 1983), styled Sir Anthony Blunt KCVO from 1956 until November 1979, was a leading British art historian and a Soviet spy.

Blunt was a professor of the history of art at the University of London, the director of the Courtauld Institute of Art and Surveyor of the Queen's Pictures. His 1967 monograph on the French Baroque painter Nicolas Poussin is still widely regarded as a watershed book in art history. His teaching text and reference work Art and Architecture in France 1500–1700, first published in 1953, reached its fifth edition (in a version slightly revised by Richard Beresford) in 1999, at which time it was still considered the best account of the subject.

He was the "fourth man" of the Cambridge Five, a group of Cambridge-educated spies who worked for the Soviets between the 1930s and the 1950s. (Blunt was the fourth member of the group to be discovered.) The height of Blunt's espionage activity was during the Second World War, when he passed intelligence to the Soviets about Wehrmacht plans which the British government had decided to withhold. In 1964, after being offered immunity from prosecution, Blunt confessed to having been a spy for the Soviet Union. His confession was revealed by Prime Minister Margaret Thatcher in November 1979. His knighthood was cancelled immediately and he died a little over three years later.

== Early life ==
Anthony Blunt was born on 26 September 1907 in Bournemouth, Hampshire. He was the third and youngest son of a Church of England priest, the Revd Arthur Stanley Vaughan Blunt (1870–1929), and his wife, Hilda Violet (1880–1969), daughter of Henry Master of the Madras civil service. His siblings included the writer Wilfrid Jasper Walter Blunt and numismatist Christopher Evelyn Blunt. A grandfather was Frederick Blunt, bishop of Hull.

Blunt's father was assigned to Paris with the British Embassy chapel and moved his family to the French capital for several years during Anthony's childhood. Blunt became fluent in French and experienced the artistic culture available to him in Paris, stimulating an interest which formed the basis for his later career.

Blunt was educated at St Peter's School, Seaford and Marlborough College, a boys' public school in Wiltshire. At Marlborough he joined the college's secret "Society of Amici", in which he was a contemporary of Louis MacNeice (whose unfinished autobiography The Strings Are False contains numerous references to Blunt), John Betjeman and Graham Shepard. He was remembered by historian John Edward Bowle, a year ahead of Blunt at Marlborough, as "an intellectual prig, too preoccupied with the realm of ideas". Bowle thought Blunt had "too much ink in his veins and belonged to a world of rather prissy, cold-blooded, academic puritanism".

In 1928, Blunt founded a political magazine, Venture, whose contributors were left-wing writers.

== University of Cambridge ==
Blunt won a scholarship in mathematics to Trinity College, Cambridge. At that time, scholars at the University of Cambridge were allowed to skip Part I of the Tripos examinations and complete Part II in two years. However, they could not earn a degree in less than three years, hence Blunt spent four years at Trinity and switched to Modern Languages with a concentration in French and Italian. He graduated in 1930 with a First Class Honours degree. Following graduation, Blunt taught French at Cambridge and became a Fellow of Trinity College in 1932. His graduate research was in French art history, and he travelled frequently to continental Europe in connection with his studies.

Like Guy Burgess, Blunt was homosexual, at a time when homosexual sex was a criminal offence in the United Kingdom. Both were members of the Cambridge Apostles (also known as the Conversazione Society), a clandestine Cambridge discussion group of twelve undergraduates, mostly from Trinity and King's Colleges who considered themselves to be the brightest minds; many were also homosexual as well as Marxist sympathisers. Through the Apostles, Blunt met the future poet Julian Bell (son of Clive and Vanessa Bell) and took him as a lover. Among other members were Victor Rothschild and the American Michael Whitney Straight, the latter also later suspected of being part of the Cambridge spy ring. Rothschild later worked for MI5 and gave Blunt £100 to purchase the painting Eliezer and Rebecca by Nicolas Poussin. The painting was sold by Blunt's executors in 1985 for £100,000 (totalling £192,500 with tax remission) and is now in Cambridge's Fitzwilliam Museum.

== Recruitment to Soviet espionage ==
There are numerous theories of how Blunt was recruited by the Soviet Union. As a Cambridge don, Blunt visited the Soviet Union in 1933 and was possibly recruited in 1934. At a press conference decades later, Blunt claimed that Burgess recruited him as a spy after both had left Cambridge. The historian Geoff Andrews writes that Blunt was "recruited between 1935 and 1936", while his biographer Miranda Carter says that it was in January 1937 that Burgess introduced Blunt to his Soviet recruiter, Arnold Deutsch. Shortly after meeting Deutsch, writes Carter, Blunt became a Soviet "talent spotter" and was given the NKVD codename "Tony". Blunt may have identified Burgess, Straight, Kim Philby, Donald Maclean and John Cairncross – all undergraduates at Trinity College (except Maclean at the neighbouring Trinity Hall) a few years younger than he – as potential spies for the Soviets.

== Joining MI5 ==
With the invasion of Poland by German and Soviet forces, Blunt joined the British Army in 1939. During the Phoney War he served in France in the Intelligence Corps. When the Wehrmacht drove British forces back to Dunkirk in May 1940, Blunt was part of the Dunkirk evacuation. During that same year he was recruited to MI5, the Security Service. Before the war, MI5 employed mostly former members of the Indian Imperial Police.

In MI5, Blunt began passing the results of Ultra intelligence (from decrypted Enigma intercepts of Wehrmacht radio traffic on the Eastern Front) to the Soviets, as well as details of German spy rings operating in the Soviet Union. Ultra was primarily working on the Kriegsmarine naval codes, which helped win the Battle of the Atlantic. As the war progressed, Wehrmacht codes were also broken. Sensitive receivers could pick up transmissions, relating to German war plans, from Berlin. There was a great risk that, if the Germans discovered their codes had been compromised, they would change the settings of the Enigma wheels, blinding the code breakers.

The entirety of Ultra was known by only four people, only one of whom routinely worked at Bletchley Park. Dissemination of Ultra information did not follow the usual intelligence protocol but maintained its own communications channels. Military intelligence officers gave intercepts to Ultra liaisons, who in turn forwarded the intercepts to Bletchley Park. Information from decoded messages was then passed back to military commanders through the same channels. Thus, each link in the communications chain knew only one particular job and not the overall Ultra details. Nobody outside Bletchley Park knew the source.

John Cairncross was posted from MI6 to work at Bletchley Park. Blunt admitted to recruiting Cairncross and may well have been the cut-out between him and Soviet contacts. Although the Soviet Union was now an ally, the Russians were not trusted. Some information concerned German preparations and detailed plans for the Battle of Kursk, the last major German offensive on the Eastern Front. Malcolm Muggeridge, a wartime British agent, recalls meeting Philby and Rothschild in Paris in 1955. He reported that Rothschild argued that much more Ultra material should have been given to Stalin; for once, Philby reportedly dropped his reserve and agreed.

During the war, Blunt attained the rank of major. He was later accused of betraying Operation Market Garden to benefit both the Nazis and the Russians. This defeat was usually attributed to the Dutch traitor Christiaan Lindemans. In The Traitor of Arnhem, premiered by The Times, there is talk of another traitor, a certain "Josephine", who the author believed to be a cover name for Blunt. The aim of the Soviets, and therefore of Blunt, would have been to prevent Allied forces from arriving in Berlin before the Russians. After the war, Blunt's espionage activity diminished, but he retained contact with Soviet agents and continued to pass them gossip from former MI5 colleagues and documents from Burgess. This continued until the defection of Burgess and Maclean in 1951.

== Trips on behalf of the royal family ==
In April 1945, Blunt, who had worked part-time at the Royal Library, was offered and accepted the job of Surveyor of the King's Pictures. His predecessor, Kenneth Clark, had resigned earlier that year. The Royal Librarian, Owen Morshead, who had become friends with Blunt during the two years he worked in the Royal Collection, recommended him for the job. Morshead had been impressed with Blunt's "diligence, his habitual reticence, and his perfect manners". Blunt often visited Morshead's home in Windsor. His student Oliver Millar, who would become his successor as Surveyor, said, "I think Anthony was happier there than many other places." Carter writes: "The royal family liked him: he was polite, effective and, above all, discreet."

In August 1945, during the final days of the Second World War, King George VI asked Blunt to accompany Morshead on a trip to Friedrichshof Castle near Frankfurt to retrieve almost 4,000 letters written by Queen Victoria to her daughter, Empress Victoria, the mother of Kaiser Wilhelm II. The account of the trip in the Royal Archives states that the letters, as well as other documents, "were exposed to risks owing to unsettled conditions after the war". According to Morshead, Blunt was needed because he knew German, which would make it easier to identify the desired material. There was a signed agreement made at the time, since the royal family did not own the documents. The letters rescued by Morshead and Blunt were deposited in the Royal Archives and were returned in 1951.

Carter mentions that other versions of the story, which claim that the trip was to retrieve letters from the Duke of Windsor to Philipp, Landgrave of Hesse, the owner of Friedrichshof Castle, in which the Duke knowingly revealed Allied secrets to Hitler, have some credibility, given the Duke's known Nazi sympathies. Variants of this version have been published by several authors. Carter allows that, while George VI may have also asked Blunt and Morshead to be on the alert for any documents relating to the Duke, "it seems unlikely that they found any". Much later, Queen Victoria's letters were edited and published in five volumes by Roger Fulford, and it was revealed they contained numerous "embarrassing and 'improper' comments about the awfulness of German politics and culture". Hugh Trevor-Roper remembered discussing the trip with Blunt at MI5 in the autumn of 1945, recalling (in Carter's retelling): "Blunt's task had been to secure the Vicky correspondence before the Americans found it and published it."

Blunt made three more trips to other locations over the following eighteen months, mainly "to recover royal treasures to which the Crown did not have an automatic right". On one trip he returned with a twelfth-century illuminated manuscript and the diamond crown of Queen Charlotte. The King had good reason to worry about the safety of the objects he had sent Blunt to retrieve: the senior American officers at Friedrichshof Castle, Kathleen Nash and Jack Durant, were later arrested for looting and put on trial.

== Suspicion and secret confession ==
Some people knew of Blunt's role as a Soviet spy long before his public exposure. According to MI5 papers released in 2002, Moura Budberg reported in 1950 that Blunt was a member of the Communist Party of Great Britain, but this was ignored. According to Blunt himself, he never joined because Burgess persuaded him that he would be more valuable to the Soviet cause by working with Burgess. He was on friendly terms with Sir Dick White, the head of MI5 and later MI6, in the 1960s, and they used to spend Christmas together with Rothschild in the latter's Cambridge residence.

Blunt's KGB handlers had also become suspicious at the sheer amount of material he was passing over, suspecting him of being a triple agent. Later, he was described by a KGB officer as "ideological shit".

With the defection of Burgess and Maclean to Moscow in May 1951, Blunt came under suspicion. Burgess returned on the RMS Queen Mary to Southampton after being suspended from the British Embassy in Washington, D.C. for his conduct. He was to warn Maclean, who now worked in the Foreign Office but was under surveillance and isolated from secret material. Blunt collected Burgess at Southampton Docks and took him to stay at his flat in London, although he later denied that he had warned the defecting pair. Blunt was interrogated by MI5 in 1952 but gave away little if anything. Arthur Martin and Jim Skardon interviewed Blunt eleven times after 1951, but Blunt had admitted nothing.

Blunt was greatly distressed by Burgess' flight and, on 28 May 1951, confided in his friend Goronwy Rees, a fellow of All Souls College, Oxford, who had briefly supplied the NKVD with political information in 1938–39. Rees suggested that Burgess had defected because of his virulent anti-Americanism and belief that the United States would involve Britain in a Third World War, and that he was a Soviet agent. Blunt suggested that this was not sufficient reason to denounce Burgess to MI5, pointing out that "Burgess was one of our oldest friends and to denounce him would not be the act of a friend." Blunt quoted E. M. Forster's belief that country was less important than friendship, arguing that "Burgess had told me he was a spy in 1936 and I had not told anyone".

In 1963, MI5 learned of Blunt's espionage from Straight, whom he had recruited. Blunt confessed to MI5 on 23 April 1964. The Private Secretary to the Sovereign was informed shortly thereafter, but Queen Elizabeth II herself was not officially informed until 1973. Blunt also named Cairncross, Jenifer Hart, Phoebe Pool, Peter Ashby, Brian Simon and Leonard Henry Long as spies. Long had also been a member of the Communist Party and an undergraduate at Trinity College, Cambridge. During the war, he served in MI14 military intelligence in the War Office, with responsibility for assessing German offensive plans. He passed analyses but not original material relating to the Eastern Front to Blunt.

According to his obituary in The New York Times, Blunt acknowledged that he had recruited spies for the Soviets from among young radical students at Cambridge, passed information to the Russians while he served as a high-ranking British intelligence officer during the Second World War and had helped two of his former Cambridge students who had become Soviet moles, Burgess and Maclean, escape in 1951 just as their activities were about to be exposed.

Blunt was convinced that his confession would be kept secret. "I believed, naively, that the security service would see it, partly in its own interest, that the story would never become public", he wrote. In return for a full confession, the British government agreed to keep his espionage an official secret, though only for fifteen years, and granted him full immunity from prosecution. Blunt was not stripped of his knighthood until the Prime Minister, Margaret Thatcher, announced his treachery in 1979.

According to the memoir of MI5 officer Peter Wright, Wright had regular interviews with Blunt from 1964 onwards for six years. Prior to that, he had a briefing with Michael Adeane, the Queen's private secretary, who told Wright: "From time to time you may find Blunt referring to an assignment he undertook on behalf of the Palace – a visit to Germany at the end of the war. Please do not pursue this matter. Strictly speaking, it is not relevant to considerations of national security."

For unknown reasons, the Prime Minister, Alec Douglas-Home, was not informed of Blunt's spying, although the Queen and Conservative Home Secretary Henry Brooke had been fully informed. In November 1979, Margaret Thatcher informed Parliament of Blunt's treachery and the immunity deal that had been arranged.

Blunt's life was little affected by the knowledge of his treachery. In 1966, two years after his secret confession, Noel Annan, provost of King's College, Cambridge, held a dinner party for Labour Home Secretary Roy Jenkins, Ann Fleming (widow of James Bond author Ian Fleming), and Victor Rothschild and his wife Tess. The Rothschilds brought their friend and lodger – Blunt. All had had wartime connections with British intelligence; Jenkins at Bletchley Park.

== Public exposure ==
In 1979, Blunt's role was represented in Andrew Boyle's book Climate of Treason, in which Blunt was given the pseudonym "Maurice", after the homosexual protagonist of E. M. Forster's novel of that name. In September of that year, Blunt had tried to obtain a typescript before the publication of Boyle's book. "Technically there was no defamation, and Boyle's editor, Harold Harris, refused to cooperate." Blunt's request was reported in the magazine Private Eye and drew his attention. In early November excerpts were published in The Observer, and on 8 November Private Eye revealed that "Maurice" was Blunt. In interviews to publicise his book, Boyle refused to confirm that Blunt was "Maurice" and asserted that was the government's responsibility.

Based on an interview with Blunt's solicitor, Michael Rubinstein (who had met Thatcher's Cabinet Secretary, Sir Robert Armstrong), Carter states that Thatcher, "personally affronted by Blunt's immunity, took the bait. She found the whole episode thoroughly reprehensible, and reeking of Establishment collusion."

On 15 November 1979, Thatcher revealed Blunt's wartime role to the House of Commons in reply to written questions put to her by two Labour Party Members of Parliament, Ted Leadbitter, MP for Hartlepool, and Dennis Skinner, MP for Bolsover:

Mr. Leadbitter and Mr. Skinner: Asked the Prime Minister if she will make a statement on recent evidence concerning the actions of an individual, whose name has been supplied to her, in relation to the security of the United Kingdom.

The Prime Minister: "The name which the hon. Member for Hartlepool (Mr. Leadbitter) has given me is that of Sir Anthony Blunt."

In a statement to the press on 20 November, Blunt claimed the decision to grant him immunity from prosecution was taken by the then-prime minister, Sir Alec Douglas-Home. Speaking in the House of Commons on 21 November, Thatcher disclosed more details of the affair.

For weeks after Thatcher's announcement, Blunt was hunted by journalists. Once found, he was besieged by photographers. Blunt had recently given a lecture at the invitation of Francis Haskell, Oxford University's professor of art history. Haskell had a Russian mother and wife and had graduated from King's College, Cambridge. To the press, this made him an obvious suspect. They telephoned Haskell's home in the early hours of the morning, using the names of his friends and claiming to have an urgent message for "Anthony".

Although Blunt was outwardly calm, the sudden exposure shocked him. His former pupil, art critic Brian Sewell, said at the time, "He was so businesslike about it; he considered the implications for his knighthood and academic honours and what should be resigned and what retained. What he didn't want was a great debate at his clubs, the Athenaeum and the Travellers. He was incredibly calm about it all." Sewell was involved in protecting Blunt from the extensive media attention, and his friend was spirited away to a flat within a house in Chiswick, staying with James Joll and John Golding.

In 1979, Blunt said that the reason for his betrayal could be explained by the E. M. Forster adage "if asked to choose between betraying his friend and betraying his country, he hoped he would have the guts to betray his country". In 2002 the novelist Julian Barnes asserted that "Blunt exploited, deceived, and lied to far more friends than he was loyal to ... if you betray your country, you by definition betray all your friends in that country."

The Queen stripped Blunt of his knighthood, and in short order he was removed as an Honorary Fellow of Trinity College. He resigned as a Fellow of the British Academy after a failed effort to expel him; three fellows resigned in protest against the failure to remove him. He broke down in tears during a BBC Television confession at the age of 72.

Blunt died of a heart attack at his London home, 9 The Grove, Highgate, in 1983, aged 75. Jon Nordheimer, the author of his obituary in The New York Times, wrote: "Details of the nature of the espionage carried out by Mr. Blunt for the Russians have never been revealed, although it is believed that they did not directly cause loss of life or compromise military operations."

== Memoirs ==
Blunt withdrew from society after he was exposed and seldom went out, but continued his work on art history. His friend Tess Rothschild suggested that he occupy his time writing his memoirs. Sewell, his former pupil, said they remained unfinished because he had to consult the Newspaper Library in Colindale to check facts, but was unhappy at being recognised.

"I do know he was really worried about upsetting his family", said Sewell. "I think he was being absolutely straight with me when he said that if he could not verify the facts there was no point in going on." Blunt stopped writing in 1983, leaving his memoirs to his partner, John Gaskin, who kept them for a year and then gave them to Blunt's executor, John Golding, a fellow art historian. Golding passed them on to the British Library, insisting that they not be released for twenty-five years. They were made available to readers on 23 July 2009 and can be accessed through the British Library catalogue.

In the typed manuscript, Blunt conceded that spying for the Soviet Union was the biggest mistake of his life.

What I did not realise is that I was so naïve politically that I was not justified in committing myself to any political action of this kind. The atmosphere in Cambridge was so intense, the enthusiasm for any anti-fascist activity was so great, that I made the biggest mistake of my life.

The memoir revealed little that was not already known about Blunt. When asked whether there would be any new or unexpected names, Golding replied: "I'm not sure. It's twenty-five years since I read it, and my memory is not that good". Although ordered by the KGB to defect with Maclean and Burgess to protect Philby, in 1951 Blunt realised "quite clearly that I would take any risk in [Britain], rather than go to Russia". After he was exposed, he claims to have considered suicide but instead turned to "whisky and concentrated work".

The regret in the manuscript seemed to stem from the way that spying had affected his life, and there was no apology. The historian Christopher Andrew felt that the regret was shallow, and that he found an "unwillingness to acknowledge the evil he had served in spying for Stalin".

== Career as an art historian ==
=== Royal Collections ===
Throughout the time of his activities in espionage, Blunt's public career was as an art historian, a field in which he gained eminence. In 1940, most of his fellowship dissertation was published under the title of Artistic Theory in Italy, 1450–1600, which remains in print. In 1945, he was given the distinguished position of Surveyor of the King's Pictures, and later the Queen's Pictures (after the death of George VI in 1952), in charge of the Royal Collection, one of the largest and richest collections of art in the world. He held the position for 27 years, was knighted as a KCVO in 1956 for his work in the role, and his contribution was vital in the expansion of the Queen's Gallery at Buckingham Palace, which opened in 1962, and organising the cataloguing of the collection.

=== University of London and Courtauld Institute ===
In 1947, Blunt became both Professor of the History of Art at the University of London, and the director of the Courtauld Institute of Art, University of London, where he had been lecturing since the spring of 1933, and where his tenure in office as director lasted until 1974. This position included the use of a live-in apartment on the premises, then at Home House in Portman Square. During his 27 years at the Courtauld Institute, Blunt was respected as a dedicated teacher, a kind superior to his staff. His legacy at the Courtauld was to have left it with a larger staff, increased funding, and more space, and his role was central in the acquisition of outstanding collections for the Courtauld Gallery. He is often credited for making the Courtauld what it is today, as well as for pioneering art history in Britain, and for training the next generation of British art historians. While at the Courtauld, Blunt contributed photographs to the Conway Library of art and architecture, which have been digitised.

=== Research and publications ===
In 1953, Blunt published his book Art and Architecture in France, 1500–1700 in the Pelican History of Art (later taken over by Yale University Press), and he was in particular an expert on the works of Nicolas Poussin, writing numerous books and articles about the painter, and serving as curator for a landmark exhibition of Poussin at the Louvre in 1960, which was an enormous success. He also wrote on topics as diverse as William Blake, Pablo Picasso, and the Galleries of England, Scotland, and Wales. He also catalogued the French drawings (1945), G. B. Castiglione and Stefano della Bella drawings (1954) Roman drawings (with H. L. Cooke, 1960) and Venetian (with Edward Croft-Murray, 1957) drawings in the Royal Collection, as well as a supplement of Addenda and Corrigenda to the Italian catalogues (in E. Schilling's German Drawings).

Blunt attended a summer school in Sicily in 1965, leading to a deep interest in Sicilian Baroque architecture, and in 1968 he wrote the only authoritative and in-depth book on the subject in English. From 1962 he was engaged in a dispute with Sir Denis Mahon regarding the authenticity of a Poussin work which rumbled on for several years. Mahon was shown to be correct. Blunt was also unaware that a painting in his own possession was also by Poussin.

After Thatcher had exposed Blunt's espionage, he continued his art history work by writing and publishing a Guide to Baroque Rome (1982). He intended to write a monograph about the architecture of Pietro da Cortona but he died before realising the project. His manuscripts were sent to the intended co-author of this work, German art historian Jörg Martin Merz by the executors of his will. Merz published a book, Pietro da Cortona and Roman Baroque Architecture in 2008 incorporating a draft by the late Anthony Blunt.

Many of his publications are still seen today by scholars as integral to the study of art history. His writing is lucid, and places art and architecture in their context in history. In Art and Architecture in France, for example, he begins each section with a brief depiction of the social, political and/or religious contexts in which works of art and art movements are emerging. In Blunt's Artistic Theory in Italy, 1450–1600, he explains the motivational circumstances involved in the transitions between the High Renaissance and Mannerism.

=== Notable students ===
Notable students who have been influenced by Blunt include Aaron Scharf, photography historian and author of Art and Photography (whom Blunt assisted, along with Scharf's wife, in escaping McCarthy condemnation for their support of communism), Brian Sewell (an art critic for the Evening Standard), Ron Bloore, Sir Oliver Millar (his successor at the Royal Collection and an expert on van Dyck), Nicholas Serota, Neil Macgregor, the former editor of The Burlington Magazine, former director of the National Gallery and former director of the British Museum who paid tribute to Blunt as "a great and generous teacher", John White (art historian), Sir Alan Bowness (who ran the Tate Gallery), John Golding (who wrote the first major book on Cubism), Reyner Banham (an influential architectural historian), John Shearman (the "world expert" on Mannerism and the former Chair of the Art History Department at Harvard University), Melvin Day (former Director of National Art Gallery of New Zealand and Government Art Historian for New Zealand ), Christopher Newall (an expert on the Pre-Raphaelites), Michael Jaffé (an expert on Rubens), Michael Mahoney (former Curator of European Paintings at the National Gallery of Art, Washington, D.C., and former Chair of the Art History Department at Trinity College, Hartford), Lee Johnson (an expert on Eugène Delacroix), Phoebe Pool (art historian) and Anita Brookner (an art historian and novelist).

=== Honorary positions ===
Among his many accomplishments, Blunt also received a series of honorary fellowships, became the National Trust's picture adviser, curated exhibitions at the Royal Academy, edited and wrote numerous books and articles, and sat on many influential committees in the arts.

== Works ==
A festschrift, Studies in Renaissance and Baroque Art presented to Anthony Blunt on his 60th Birthday, Phaidon 1967 (introduction by Ellis Waterhouse), contains a full list of his writings up to 1966.

Major works include:

- Blunt, Artistic Theory in Italy, 1450–1600, 1940 and many later editions.
- Blunt, François Mansart and the Origins of French Classical Architecture, 1941.
- Blunt, Art and Architecture in France, 1500–1700, 1953 and many subsequent editions.
- Blunt, Philibert de l'Orme, A. Zwemmer, 1958.
- Blunt, Nicolas Poussin. A Critical Catalogue, Phaidon, 1966.
- Blunt, Nicolas Poussin, Phaidon 1967 (new edition Pallas Athene, published, London, 1995).
- Blunt, Sicilian Baroque, 1968 (ed. it. Milano 1968; Milano 1986).
- Blunt, Picasso's Guernica, Oxford University Press, 1969.
- Blunt, Neapolitan Baroque and Rococo Architecture, London 1975 (ed. it. Milano 2006).
- Blunt, Baroque and Rococo Architecture and Decoration, 1978.
- Blunt, Borromini, 1979 (ed. it. Roma-Bari 1983).
- Blunt, L'occhio e la storia. Scritti di critica d'arte (1936–38), a cura di Antonello Negri, Udine 1999.

Important articles after 1966:

- Anthony Blunt, "French Painting, Sculpture and Architecture since 1500", in France: A Companion to French Studies, ed. D. G. Charlton (New York, Toronto and London: Pitman, 1972), 439–492.
- Anthony Blunt, "Rubens and architecture", The Burlington Magazine, 1977, 894, pp. 609–621.
- Anthony Blunt, "Roman Baroque Architecture: the Other Side of the Medal", Art history, no. 1, 1980, pp. 61–80 (includes bibliographical references).

== Depictions in popular culture ==
- 1985. Blunt: The Fourth Man is a 1985 television film starring Ian Richardson as Blunt, Anthony Hopkins as Burgess, Michael Williams as Goronwy Rees, and Rosie Kerslake as Margie Rees, covering the events of 1951 when Burgess and Maclean went missing.
- 1989. The Endless Game featured a character based on Blunt. Anthony Quayle played Herbert Glanville, an art critic dubbed the Fifth Man of a Cambridge spy ring who made a deal to get immunity from prosecution.
- 1991. A Question of Attribution is a play written by Alan Bennett about Blunt, covering the weeks before his public exposure as a spy, and his relationship with Elizabeth II. After a successful run in London's West End, it was made into a television play directed by John Schlesinger and starring James Fox, Prunella Scales and Geoffrey Palmer. It was aired on the BBC in 1991. This play was seen as a companion to Bennett's 1983 television play about Guy Burgess, An Englishman Abroad.
- 1996. "I. M. Anthony Blunt" is a poem by Gavin Ewart, published in Gavin Ewart, Selected Poems 1933–1993, Hutchinson, 1996 (reprinted Faber and Faber, 2011).
- 1997. The Untouchable, a 1997 novel by John Banville, is a roman à clef based largely on the life and character of Blunt; the novel's protagonist, Victor Maskell, is a loosely disguised Blunt.
- 1997. A Friendship of Convenience: Being a Discourse on Poussin's "Landscape With a Man Killed by a Snake", is a 1997 novel by Rufus Gunn set in 1956 in which Blunt, then Surveyor of the Queen's Pictures, encounters Joseph Losey, the film director fleeing McCarthyism.
- 2003. Blunt was portrayed by Samuel West in Cambridge Spies, a 2003 four-part BBC television drama concerning the lives of the Cambridge Four from 1934 to the defection of Burgess and Maclean to the Soviet Union. West reprised the role in The Crown (2019), in "Olding", the first episode of the third season. At the end of the episode, a series of on-screen titles simply say, "Anthony Blunt was offered complete immunity from prosecution. He continued as Surveyor of the Queen's Pictures until his retirement in 1972. The Queen never spoke of him again." No mention is made of the Queen stripping him of his knighthood or his removal as an Honorary Fellow of Trinity College.
- 2016. "Fellow Traveller", a track on John K. Samson's studio album Winter Wheat (2016), was inspired by Blunt. The song takes place the day after he was named as a spy.
- 2019. Liberation Square, Gareth Rubin's alternative history of the UK, published in 2019, makes Blunt First Party Secretary of a 1950s Britain divided by US and Russian forces.
- 2022. Blunt is portrayed by Nicholas Rowe in the 2022 ITVX miniseries A Spy Among Friends, an espionage drama based on Ben Macintyre's book of the same name. In the final episode of the series, the first on-screen title reports: "Sir Anthony Blunt's treason was kept secret until 1979, when Margaret Thatcher exposed him in a speech to Parliament, forcing the Queen to strip him of his knighthood."

== Bibliography ==
- Andrews, Geoff (2015). The Shadow Man: At the Heart of the Cambridge Spy Circle. London: I.B. Tauris. ISBN 9781784531669.
- Banville, John (1997). The Untouchable (novel). London: Picador. ISBN 9780330339315.
- Bennett, Alan (1988). A Question of Attribution, first theatre performance as the second part of a double-bill, with An Englishman Abroad about Guy Burgess as the first part, London, 1988; broadcast as television play, 1991; both plays published in one volume as Single Spies, London, Faber, 1989, ISBN 0-571-14105-6.
- Bounds, Philip (2018). "A Spy in the House of Art: The Marxist Criticism of Anthony Blunt", Critique: Journal of Socialist Theory, vol. 46 no. 2, pp. 343–362.
- Boyle, Andrew (1979). The Climate of Treason: Five Who Spied for Russia. London: Hutchinson. ISBN 9780091393403.
- Burlington (1974). "Editorial: Anthony Blunt and the Courtauld Institute". The Burlington Magazine, vol. 116, no. 858 (September 1974), p. 501.
- Carter, Miranda (2001). Anthony Blunt: His Lives, London: Pan (609 pages). ISBN 0-330-36766-8. New York: Farrar, Straus and Giroux (590 pages). ISBN 0-374-10531-6.
- Chastel, André (1983). "Anthony Blunt, art historian (1907–1983)", The Burlington Magazine, vol 125, no. 966 (September 1983), pp. 546–547. JSTOR 881276.
- Costello, John (1988). Mask Of Treachery, London, Collins. ISBN 0-688-04483-2.
- De Seta, Cesare (1991). "Anthony Blunt", in Viale Belle Arti. Maestri e amici, Milano, pp. 111–138.
- Foster, Henrietta (2008). "Unearthing an interview with a spy". Newsnight. (23 January 2008). BBC. Retrieved 23 January 2008.
- Gatti, Andrea (2002). "La critica della ragione. sulla teoria dell'arte di Anthony Blunt", Miscellanea Marciana, vol. 17, pp. 193–205. ISSN 0394-7866.
- Kitson, Michael, rev. Carter, Miranda. "Blunt, Anthony Frederick". Oxford Dictionary of National Biography (online ed.). Oxford University Press. doi:10.1093/ref:odnb/30829. (Subscription, Wikipedia Library access or UK public library membership required.)
- Lenzo, Fulvio (2006). Napoli e l'architettura italiana ed europea negli studi di Anthony Blunt, in Anthony Blunt, Architettura barocca e rococò a Napoli, ed. it. a cura di Fulvio Lenzo, Milano, pp. 7–15.
- MacNeice, Louis (1965). The Strings are False, London, Faber. ISBN 0-571-11832-1.
- Penrose, Barrie and Simon Freeman (1987). Conspiracy of Silence: The Secret Life of Anthony Blunt. New York. ISBN 9780679720447.
- Petropoulos, Jonathan (2006). The Royals and the Reich. Oxford University Press. ISBN 0195161335.
- Sorenson, Lee. "Blunt, Anthony". Dictionary of Art Historians.
- Straight, Michael (1983). After Long Silence: the Man Who Exposed Anthony Blunt Tells for the First Time the Story of the Cambridge Spy Network from the Inside, London, Collins. ISBN 0-00-217001-9.
- Varriano, John (1996). "Blunt, Anthony", vol. 4, p. 182, in The Dictionary of Art (34 volumes), edited by Jane Turner. New York: Grove. ISBN 9781884446009. Also available at Oxford Art Online (subscription required).
- West, Nigel (1999). The Crown Jewels: The British Secrets Exposed by the KGB Archives, London. ISBN 9780300078060.
- Wright, Peter (1987). Spycatcher: The Candid Autobiography of a Senior Intelligence Officer. Toronto: Stoddart Publishers. ISBN 9780773721685.

Court offices
Preceded by Kenneth Clark	Surveyor of the Queen's Pictures; 1945 to 1973	Succeeded by Oliver Millar
Academic offices
Preceded by T. S. R. Boase	Director of the Courtauld Institute of Art; 1947 to 1974	Succeeded by Peter Lasko
Preceded by Kenneth Clark	Slade Professor of Fine Art, Oxford University; 1962	Succeeded by T. S. R. Boase
Preceded by John Pope-Hennessy	Slade Professor of Fine Art, Cambridge University; 1965	Succeeded by John Summerson
