= John Costello (historian) =

British military historian

John Edmond Costello (3 May 1943 – 26 August 1995) was a British military historian, who wrote about World War I, World War II and the Cold War. He was the first foreigner to have access to the operational records of the KGB and its predecessors and was instrumental for opening historical research during the immediate post-perestroika period.

== Birth and early life ==
He was born at Larkfield Hospital, Greenock, Inverclyde, on 3 May 1943, the son of Lieut. Commander Cecil and Suzanne (née Davis) Costello. His father was an engineer officer in the Royal Navy and had been awarded the Distinguished Service Cross in the previous year. After the war the family lived at Gosport, Hampshire, and later at Newbury, Berkshire, where Costello was educated at the local grammar school before proceeding to Fitzwilliam College, Cambridge, to read economics and law.

Naturally opinionated and outspoken, he soon became prominent in student debating and political circles. He was Secretary of the Cambridge Union, Chairman of the University’s Conservative Association, and reputedly one of the founders of the Pest (Pressure for Economic and Social Toryism) initiative. As editor-designate of the undergraduate journal New Radical he readily agreed to amalgamation with its Oxford equivalent, Oxford Tory (which had recently attracted Robert Maxwell’s wrath following comment on his Eastern Bloc connections), and he co-edited the resultant Tory. In later years he was joint-author of a Bow Group paper advocating establishment of a national Broadcasting Council.

== First books ==
Graduating in 1965, he worked as an advertising copywriter before joining London Weekend Television and then the BBC where he was employed in documentary production. In collaboration with Terry Hughes he wrote a succession of books of which the first, published by the provincial Compton Press in 1971, celebrated the British and French technical achievement in developing the world’s first supersonic airliner. This originally appeared under the title The Battle for Concorde and, edited by William F. Waller, was reissued by Macmillan in the following year as Concorde - Flight into the Future. With Hughes he went on to write accounts of the 1916 Battle of Jutland and of the campaign waged by German submariners against British shipping in the Atlantic between 1939 and 1945, and the pair also worked with Warren Tute to tell the story of the 1944 Normandy Landings.

== Move to the United States ==
In 1972 he embarked on a career as a full-time freelance writer. Five years later he moved to live in America, initially basing himself in New York and subsequently relocating to Miami. In 1981 his account of the Pacific War, analysing its complex underlying causes and bringing together accounts of the fighting in its several theatres, won him a reputation in his new home country for authoritative and attractive historical writing. The book soon become a standard university teaching text in America where, in researching it, he had been able to access the kind of documents that in England were closed to public inspection.

== Later focus on espionage ==
His opinion that World War II brought about a major change in British social and sexual attitudes, largely as a result of women’s participation in the war effort, found expression in his 1985 bestseller Love, Sex and War: Changing Values. His assessment that the war had seen a collapse of morals and “hedonism in the shadow of death” was criticised as somewhat sensationalist, but his 1988 account of Anthony Blunt’s central role in formation of the Cambridge spy-ring (Mask of Treachery) was almost uniformly well received. This established him in the field of writing he was to occupy for the rest of his career, Costello’s grasp of the scale and complexity of the espionage directed or facilitated by Blunt being acclaimed as “incomparably the finest yet revealed”.

In 1990, hoping to take advantage of the new spirit of glasnost within the Soviet Union, he wrote to the KGB’s press office asking what information they had on Rudolf Hess’s mysterious solo flight to Britain in 1941. His letter elicited, via the diplomatic bag, decrypted copies of Kim Philby’s contemporary messages to Moscow. Their content contributed to his book Ten Days that Saved the West (1991), in which he concluded that MI5 had lured Hess to Britain in response to an invitation from the Duke of Hamilton - a conclusion subsequently dismissed as one of Costello’s “pet conspiracy theories”.

His approach to the KGB led to his meeting Oleg Tsarev, a senior intelligence officer who had previously spent seven years under TASS cover in London and who, at Costello’s prompting, persuaded Vladimir Kryuchkov that access to the archives of the KGB and its predecessors was a privilege for which western publishers might pay handsomely. As a result Costello became the first foreigner to read KGB operational files and he and Tsarev collaborated in writing an account of the career of Alexander Orlov. This account (Deadly Illusions, 1993) revealed Orlov as a much more pivotal figure in the history of twentieth century intelligence than previously assumed, exposing in particular his key role in recruitment of the original members of the Cambridge spy-ring and of the atom spies in the United States.

== Final work and death ==
Costello next persuaded Crown Publishing Group to pay a considerable sum to the SVR to allow a team of American historians to work alongside KGB officers in examining Soviet intelligence records. This exercise led to the publication of a succession of important books by members of the team, examining matters such as Soviet intelligence gathering in America in the 1930s and ‘40s, rivalry between the KGB and CIA in Berlin before construction of the Wall, and the sequence of events during the Cuban Missile Crisis. Most immediately it resulted in Costello and Tsarev laying bare the extent of Soviet penetration of the British Foreign Office over the course of more than twenty years and the existence in Britain of Soviet spy networks additional to the Cambridge ring.

Costello was in the midst of working with Tsarev on a project to document these latter infiltrations when he died suddenly on a flight from London to Miami on 26 August 1995. The espionage author Nigel West succeeded him in the project with Tsarev, and their resultant book The Crown Jewels was published in 1999.

== Government displeasure ==
Costello’s unexpected death at the age of 52, in somewhat unusual circumstances, attracted initial speculation that it had been contrived by Russian or British interests. There were certainly many, at government or agency level both in Britain and America, who were embarrassed by the security and intelligence failures he revealed. In 1988 he had been subject to a D-Notice; in 1993 British diplomats allegedly urged Russia to cease cooperation with him; and he ruffled feathers by praising the SVR for helping to establish “a new precedent for openness and objectivity in the study of intelligence history” at a time when Britain wished to maintain strict secrecy for intelligence documents.

== Success and criticism ==
Costello’s books were commercial successful and were well received in the United States. He argued that historians should combine thorough research with vivid presentation, and was noted for extensive archival research and for seeking out sources whose knowledge had previously been overlooked.[6]

This flair for research was combined with “a penchant for conspiracy theory” and in his theorising he “used instinct and imagination to buttress his scholarship”. This led to criticism that he was a subjective interpreter rather than a dispassionate recorder of history and was prone to ignore evidence inconsistent with his thesis. He wrote for a general rather than an academic audience and knew that controversy was critical to his popular appeal; as one of his friends and obituarists recalled, “he used controversy throughout his life to draw attention to himself and his causes”.

== Published works ==
- The Battle for Concorde (UK) (1971) with Terry Hughes ISBN 0900193026, or The Concorde Conspiracy (US) (1976) ISBN 0684143747
- D-Day (1974) with Warren Tute & Terry Hughes ISBN 028398144X
- Jutland 1916 (1976) with Terry Hughes ISBN 0860073629
- The Battle of the Atlantic (1977) with Terry Hughes ISBN 000216048X
- The Pacific War (1981) ISBN 9780002160469
- Virtue under Fire: How World War II Changed Our Social and Sexual Attitudes (US) (1985) ISBN 0316739685, or Love, Sex and War: Changing Values 1939–45 (UK) (1985) ISBN 9780002174442
- "And I was There": Pearl Harbor and Midway – Breaking the Secrets (1985) with Rear Admiral Edwin Layton (his story) & Captain Roger Pineau ISBN 0688069681
- Mask of Treachery (1988) about Anthony Blunt ISBN 9780002175364
- Ten Days to Destiny (US) or Ten Days that Saved the West (UK) (1991), about Rudolf Hess ISBN 0688103634
- Deadly Illusions (1993) with Oleg Tsarev, about Aleksandr Mikhailovich Orlov ISBN 0-517-58850-1
- Days of Infamy: MacArthur, Roosevelt, Churchill – the Shocking Truth Revealed (1994) about the defeats at Pearl Harbor and the Philippines ISBN 0-671-76985-5
