= Barrie Penrose =

British journalist (1942–2020)

Barrie Penrose (26 January 1942 – 5 July 2020) was a British investigative journalist, interviewer and trainer.

== Life and career ==
Born in Croydon, Penrose was educated at John Ruskin Grammar School and later at the London School of Economics.

He worked for the New York Herald Tribune in Paris, The Observer, The Sunday Times and BBC Television, initially as Barrie Sturt-Penrose.

In December 1979, John Cairncross – who had secretly admitted to an MI5 interrogator that he had spied for the Soviets – was approached by Penrose and made a full confession to the journalist. The news was widely publicized, leading many to believe that Cairncross was the so-called "fifth man" of the Cambridge Five spy ring. This designation would be confirmed in 1989 by KGB agent Oleg Gordievsky, who defected to Britain.

Penrose was on the diving support vessel Stephaniturm for the recovery of HMS Edinburgh's gold salvage, and had exclusive journalistic access to the salvage. In the course of his reporting and subsequent authorship of the book Stalin's Gold, Penrose claimed salvage expert Keith Jessop was "unprincipled and devious", had secured the contract through nefarious means including bribery, and that the divers routinely messed with and desecrated the bodies entombed in the wreck during the dive. Taken to tribunal by Keith Jessop over those claims, Penrose's words were judged libellous and all copies of Stalin's Gold were ordered pulped.

Penrose wrote The Pencourt File (with BBC colleague Roger Courtiour) based on information recounted by Harold Wilson, shortly after he had resigned as British prime minister. Wilson had requested contact with the journalists about conspiracies that he claimed had occurred during his period in government.

Penrose died on 5 July 2020 due to complications of Parkinson's disease.

== Bibliography ==
- Sturt-Penrose, Barrie (1969). The Art Scene. Hamlyn Ltd. ISBN 978-0600000532.
- Penrose, Barrie; Courtiour, Roger (1978). The Pencourt File. Martin Secker & Warburg Ltd. ISBN 978-0436366406.
- Penrose, Barrie (1983). Stalin's Gold: The Story of HMS Edinburgh and Its Treasure. Little Brown & Co. ISBN 978-0316698771.
- Penrose, Barrie; Freeman, Simon (1996). Rinkagate: The Rise and Fall of Jeremy Thorpe. Bloomsbury Publishing. ISBN 978-0747533399.
