= Chapman Pincher =

English journalist (1914–2014)

- Portrait by Jane Bown, 1987
- Born: Henry Chapman Pincher; 29 March 1914; Ambala, Punjab Province, British India
- Died: 5 August 2014 (aged 100); Kintbury, Berkshire, England
- Education: King's College London
- Occupations: Journalist; historian; novelist
- Spouses: 3, including: Constance Sylvia Wolstenholme (m. 1965)
- Children: 2; several stepchildren from previous marriages
- Writing career
- Subject: Espionage

Henry Chapman Pincher (29 March 1914 – 5 August 2014) was an English journalist, historian and novelist whose writing mainly focused on espionage and related matters, after some early books on scientific subjects.

== Early life ==
Pincher was born in Ambala, India to English parents. His father, Richard Chapman Pincher, originally from Pontefract in Yorkshire, was a major in the British army serving in the Northumberland Fusiliers. His mother Helen (née Foster), had been an actress and the couple had married in 1913 in Pontefract.

The family returned to Pontefract when Pincher was aged three. He attended several different schools before the family settled in Darlington, where his father would later own a sweet shop and a pub on the River Tees. Aged 10, he won a scholarship to Darlington Grammar School where he took an interest in genetics, afterwards studying zoology and biology at King's College London.

Chapman Pincher was married three times. His last wife was Constance Sylvia Wolstenholme whom he married in 1965. Pincher had two children from an earlier marriage.

== Early career: teaching and the Army ==
His first teaching job as a physics master was at the Liverpool Institute High School for Boys where he took pride in writing agricultural journals.

When World War II began, Pincher joined the Royal Armoured Corps, served in tanks and became a Staff Officer. He took a particular interest in the details of weaponry and in intelligence and how it related to military purposes.

Because of his previous journalistic experience, he was contacted by the Daily Express for information about the new explosive RDX that had been developed. He was allowed by the military to give appropriate details about RDX and was later allowed to supply information on other subjects. These included the "V-1 flying bomb, the V-2 rocket and the atom bomb dropped on Hiroshima."

The Daily Express could see the potential in the pieces which he had produced when a serving army officer and when he finished his time in the Army he was recruited by them as a journalist. Pincher believed it was important to keep the media informed on military decisions, and began to specialise in finding angles that nobody else covered.

== Career ==
As a defence correspondent for the Daily Express, Pincher developed his own style of investigative journalism, actively seeking out high-level contacts to obtain secret information. Assigned to cover the stories of physicists Alan Nunn May and Klaus Fuchs, who in the early post-war years were unmasked as Soviet spies, espionage became a particular interest of Pincher's.

Pincher's career as a journalist thereon mainly involved uncovering Cold War secrets in London for the Daily Express. During his career, he had contacts within the British Government that suggested MI5 and MI6 could possibly be providing housing unwittingly for Soviet agents. Pincher always went "above and beyond" for his investigative reporting style, including checking people's personal phone calls and relentlessly importuning important people, such as Prime Minister Harold Wilson, for answers to questions that Pincher thought were being concealed from the public. He regularly provided exclusives that other journalists had missed, which led to his employers calling him "the lone wolf of Fleet Street". He made both friends and enemies in high places. In 1959, Prime Minister Harold Macmillan wrote to his Minister of Defence: "Can nothing be done to suppress or get rid of Chapman Pincher?" Pincher obtained the title "spy catcher" after he exposed several people as spies, including George Blake, an MI6 member who let close to one hundred Soviet spies get jobs at the embassy in London.

According to MI5 files held at the National Archives, Pincher served as a middle-man between his colleague Sefton Delmer and Otto John, the West German spy chief who had 'defected' to the Soviet Union and then escaped back again. John, a member of the German Resistance during the Second World War, wanted to publish his memoirs after his imprisonment in West Germany. Pincher was able to source the manuscript from Delmer, and then passed the material onto the Security Services. It is further speculated that Pincher, then The Daily Express' military correspondent, vouched for Delmer when Winston Churchill launched a secret investigation into the journalist. MI5 cited a source at The Express as part of the probe.

According to the historian E. P. Thompson, "The columns of the Daily Express are a kind of official urinal where high officials of MI5 and MI6 stand side-by-side patiently leaking... . Mr. Pincher is too self-important and light-witted to realize how often he is being used". In reply, Pincher said "If someone wants to come and tell me some news that nobody else knows and I make a lovely scoop of it, come on, use me!".

He won awards as Journalist of the Year in 1964, and Reporter of the Decade in 1966.

== Later life and career ==
Pincher is best known as the author of the book Their Trade is Treachery (1981), in which he publicized for the first time the suspicions that MI5's former Director General Roger Hollis had been a spy for the Soviet Union, and described MI5's and MI6's internal inquiries into the matter. Pincher was at one point close to Peter Wright.

Pincher became ensnared in 1986 in the Spycatcher affair, when Wright tried to publish his own book in Australia, in apparent violation of his oath-taking of the Official Secrets Act when he joined MI5. The matter led to prolonged legal wrangling, with the British government mounting a strong defence against publication, which was ultimately unsuccessful through three levels of the Australian court system. Wright was represented by the barrister Malcolm Turnbull who, in 2015, became the 29th Australian Prime Minister. During his cross-examination, Turnbull exposed the British Cabinet Secretary, Sir Robert Armstrong, in a clear lie. In the meantime, Spycatcher was published in the United States in mid-1987, where it became a best seller. Pincher was investigated and cleared of any wrongdoing, through a police investigation.

== Death ==
Pincher died on 5 August 2014 at Kintbury in West Berkshire, aged 100 years old, having suffered a stroke seven weeks earlier. He died with his family by his side, talking about his time in espionage and the power it gave him in his career.

== Publications ==
- The Breeding of Farm Animals (London: Penguin, 1946)
- Into the Atomic Age (London: Hutchinson, 1948)
- It's Fun Finding Out (with Bernard Wicksteed, 1950)
- "Secrets et mystères du monde animal" (spotlight on animals; London: Hutchinson and Co., 1950. Collection "les livres de la nature", préface de jean Rostand pour l'édition française, chez Stock 1952)
- Not with a Bang (novel, 1965)
- The Giant Killer (novel, 1967)
- The Penthouse Conspirators (novel; London: Michael Joseph, 1970)
- The Skeleton at the Villa Wolkonsky (novel; London: Michael Joseph, 1975)
- The Eye of the Tornado (novel; London: Michael Joseph, 1976)
- The Four Horses (1978)
- Inside Story (1978)
- Dirty Tricks (1980)
- Their Trade is Treachery (1981)
- The Private World of St John Terrapin (1982)
- Too Secret Too Long (1984)
- The Secret Offensive (1985)
- A Web of Deception: The Spycatcher Affair (London: Sidgwick and Jackson, 1987, ISBN 0-283-99654-4)
- Traitors: The Labyrinths of Treason
- The Truth About Dirty Tricks (1990)
- Pastoral Symphony : a Bumpkin's Tribute to Country Joys (1993)
- Tight Lines!: Accumulated Lore of a Lifetime's Angling (1997)
- Treachery: Betrayals, Blunders, and Cover-ups: Six Decades of Espionage Against America and Great Britain (New York: Random House, 2009; as Treachery: Betrayals, Blunders and Cover-Ups: Six Decades of Espionage 2011, Mainstream, UK)
- Chapman Pincher: Dangerous To Know (Biteback, 2014)
