= Peter Wright (MI5 officer) =

English scientist and MI5 intelligence officer

- Born: 9 August 1916; Chesterfield, Derbyshire, England
- Died: 26 April 1995 (aged 78); Cygnet, Tasmania, Australia
- Education: St Peter's College, Oxford
- Occupation: Intelligence officer
- Spouse: Lois Foster-Melliar (m. 1938)
- Children: Three

Peter Maurice Wright CBE (9 August 1916 – 26 April 1995) was a principal scientific officer for MI5, the British counter-intelligence agency. His book Spycatcher, written with Paul Greengrass, became an international bestseller with sales of over two million copies. Spycatcher was part memoir, part exposé detailing what Wright claimed were serious institutional failures he investigated within MI5. Wright is said to have been influenced in his counterespionage activity by James Jesus Angleton, counter-intelligence chief of the US Central Intelligence Agency (CIA) from 1954 to 1975.

== Early life ==
Peter Wright was born at 26 Cromwell Road, Chesterfield, Derbyshire, the son of (George) Maurice Wright CBE, director of research for the Marconi Company, who was one of the founders of signals intelligence during the First World War. Wright was educated at Bishop's Stortford College, an independent boarding school for boys in Bishop's Stortford, Hertfordshire, and St Peter's College, Oxford.

== Career ==
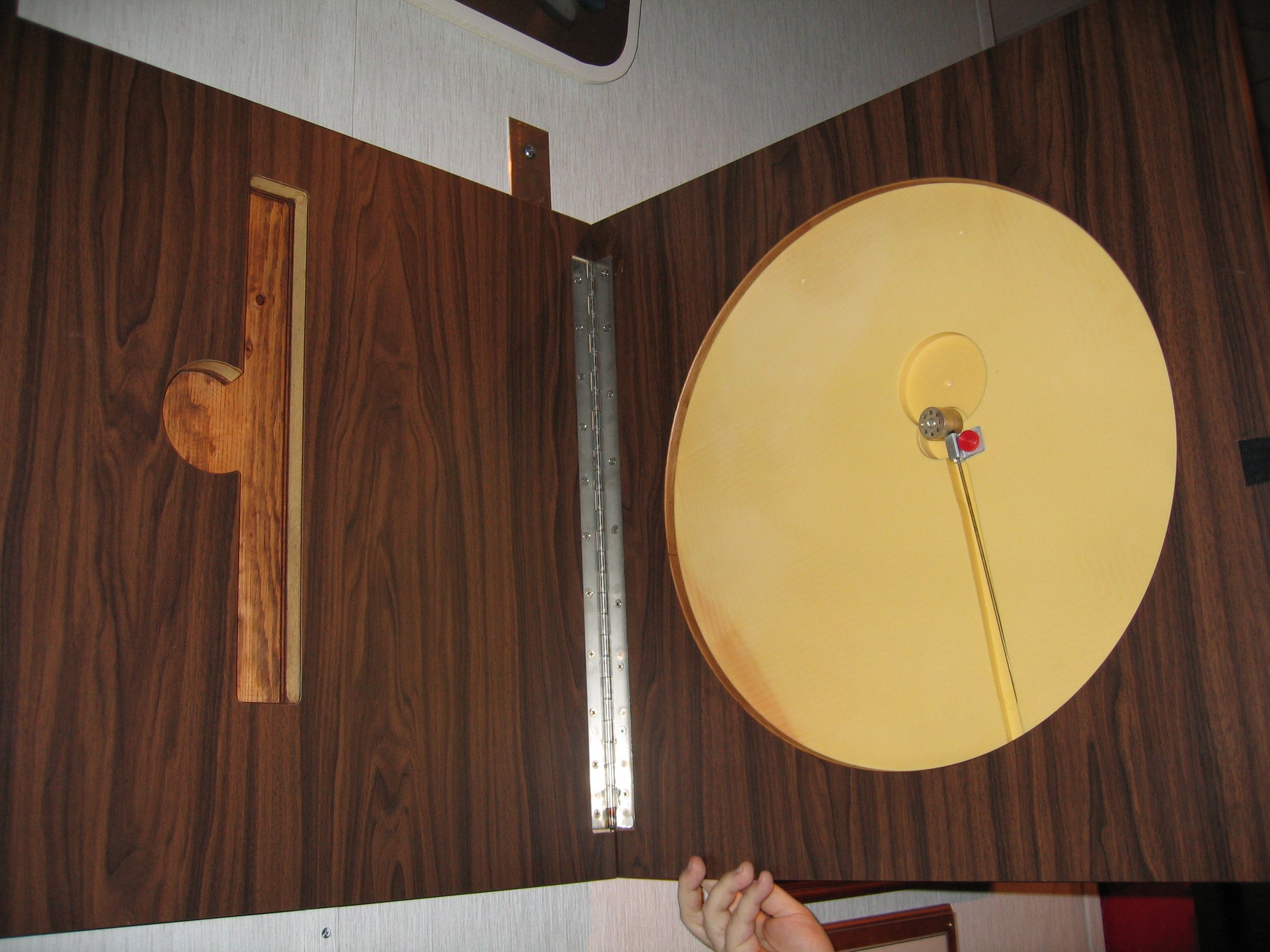
Replica of the Great Seal which contained "The Thing" a Soviet bugging device, on display at the NSA's National Cryptologic Museum

Wright graduated shortly before the Second World War and soon followed in his father’s footsteps, taking a job at the Admiralty's Research Laboratory. He remained there throughout the war and in 1946 began work as a Principal Scientific Officer at the Services Electronics Research Laboratory.

According to his own account, Wright’s work for MI5, initially part-time, started in the spring of 1949 when he was given a job as a Navy Scientist attached to the Marconi Company. According to Spycatcher, during his stint there, Wright was instrumental in resolving a difficult technical problem. The Central Intelligence Agency (CIA) sought Marconi's assistance with a covert listening device (or "bug") that had been found in a replica of the Great Seal of the United States presented to the United States ambassador in Moscow in 1945 by the Young Pioneer organization of the Soviet Union. Wright determined that the bugging device, dubbed The Thing, was actually a tiny capacitive membrane (a condenser microphone) that became active only when 330 MHz microwaves were beamed to it from a remote transmitter. A remote receiver could then have been used to decode the modulated microwave signal and permit sounds picked up by the microphone to be heard. The device was eventually attributed to the Soviet inventor Léon Theremin.

== Intelligence career highlights ==
In 1954, Wright was recruited as principal scientific officer for MI5. According to his memoirs, he then was either responsible for, or intimately involved with, the development of some of the basic methods of ELINT, for example:

- Operation ENGULF (MI5): acoustic cryptanalysis—recording the sound of the settings of Egyptian Hagelin cipher machines in 1956.
- Operation RAFTER (MI5): remote detection of passive radio receivers used by Soviet illegals through detecting emanations from the local oscillator, in 1958 (a technique now more commonly used to enforce payment of television licences). The program eventually expanded into airborne operations, where receivers were detected from transport planes, thus giving the general area where mobile ground detection could be initiated. This was done by flooding the vicinity with vans that at best could pinpoint buildings or blocks. However, the method was less successful against mobile receivers.
- Operation STOCKADE (MI5/GCHQ): analysis of compromising emanation from French cipher machine cables in 1960. They used broad band radio detection of the cables, and were actually able to read the original plain text along the low-grade cipher sequence. Surprisingly, murmurs of high-grade ciphers could sometimes be read from the same cable, which after comparison to the cable fed signal, gave a path to even that cipher's plain text leakage. From 1960 to 1963 the MI5 and GCHQ could read cipher traffic to and from the French embassy in London.

Wright worked as the first chairman of the new Radio Operations Committee (ROC) when it was formed in 1960. The technical staffs from the earlier separate and competitive British intelligence organizations finally began to combine their efforts, thus allowing the methods used in ENGULF and RAFTER to be expanded into domestic and foreign intelligence operations that would last into the late 1960s. According to Wright, MI5, MI6 and GCHQ had not functioned together or shared information as effectively since the war.

In 1964, Wright became chairman of a joint MI5/MI6 committee, codenamed FLUENCY Working Party, appointed to find Soviet agents and moles in Britain. For six years beginning in 1964 he regularly interviewed Anthony Blunt, a member of the Cambridge Five, trying to glean more information from him about other Soviet agents.

== Claims about Roger Hollis, the Wilson Plot et al. ==
While serving in MI5, Wright became aware that, since the 1930s, Soviet espionage agencies had been infiltrating the British government’s military and education establishments with the help of close-knit left-wing homosexual circles at Oxford and Cambridge, especially the Cambridge Apostles. With like-minded MI5 officers, Wright became alert to the fact that some senior figures in the intelligence services, in politics, and in the trade unions had been recruited long ago as Soviet agents.

After Soviet spy Kim Philby's defection to the USSR in 1963, following what Wright refers to as a warning by "a fifth man, still inside", he became convinced that the KGB had penetrated the highest levels of MI5, claiming in Spycatcher that Roger Hollis was the highest-placed Soviet mole within the service. Wright went so far as to begin to make, as he himself put it, "his own 'freelance' inquiries into Hollis's background" shortly before the latter's retirement.

According to Wright, his initial, unspecified suspicion was aroused by his analysis of the KGB's reaction to the arrest of Soviet operative Gordon Lonsdale in January 1961. The KGB appeared to have had foreknowledge of the arrest, and Wright deduced that Lonsdale may have been sacrificed to protect a more important Soviet spy in Britain. His suspicions were further strengthened by Hollis's apparent obstruction of any attempt to investigate information from several defectors that there was a mole in MI5; and his discovery that Hollis had concealed relationships with a number of suspicious persons, including Claud Cockburn, a communist journalist who was at the time suspected of connections to Soviet intelligence; and Agnes Smedley, at a time when Smedley was in a relationship with Soviet spymaster Richard Sorge.

Later during his investigations, Wright examined the debriefings of Soviet defector Igor Gouzenko and found to his surprise that the revelations of that debriefing were neither reported nor recorded. After a lengthy check, he discovered that it had been Hollis who was sent to Canada to interview Gouzenko. Gouzenko had provided Hollis with clear information about Alan Nunn May's meetings with his Soviet handlers and noted that the man who met him seemed to be in disguise, not interested in his revelations, and discouraged him from further disclosures.

Gouzenko had not known about Klaus Fuchs, but he had named a low level suspected GRU agent, Israel Halperin, a mathematician who was later completely cleared of any suspicions of espionage. When the Royal Canadian Mounted Police searched Halperin's lodgings, they found the name of Fuchs in his address book. Fuchs immediately ceased contact with his handler, Harry Gold, and shortly afterwards took a long vacation in Mexico. Wright alleges in Spycatcher that Gouzenko himself deduced later that his interviewer might have been a Soviet double agent and was probably afraid that Gouzenko might recognize him from case photos that Gouzenko might have seen in KGB or GRU files, which would explain why Hollis was disguised.

According to Wright, the FLUENCY Working Party, an inter-agency committee created to examine all the hitherto unsolved allegations about penetration of the British security apparatus, unanimously concluded, among other things, that Hollis was the likely individual for allegations levelled by Gouzenko and fellow defector Konstantin Volkov. The committee submitted its final report shortly after Hollis retired in late 1965 as MI5 Director-General, but an investigation of Hollis was not authorized by his successor, Martin Furnival Jones, who nevertheless authorized the investigation of his deputy, Michael Hanley. A retired civil servant, Burke Trend, later Lord Trend, was summoned during the early 1970s to review the Hollis case. After studying the case for a year, Trend concluded that the evidence was inconclusive for either convicting or clearing Hollis; this was announced in March 1981 by Prime Minister Margaret Thatcher.

On the basis of his interviews with Sir Dennis Proctor and friends, Wright also alleged in Spycatcher that Proctor, former Permanent Secretary at the Ministry of Power, was at the very least, by Proctor's own account, an unwitting source of secret information to the Soviets via his close friend and Soviet spy Guy Burgess, from whom he had kept no secrets. Wright's investigation was also focused on Labour prime minister Harold Wilson, suspicions about whom were initially triggered amongst the MI5 leadership by James Jesus Angleton, chief of counterintelligence for the CIA. The MI5 investigation into Wilson's background, however, failed to produce any conclusive evidence.

When Wright retired in 1976, Wilson was again prime minister. Dame Stella Rimington, MI5 Director-General from 1992 to 1996, later wrote in 2001 that she believed that in a Panorama programme in 1988, Wright had retracted an allegation made in his book about the MI5 group of thirty officers who plotted to overthrow Wilson's government. She also criticised Wright who, according to her, was "a man with an obsession, and was regarded by many as quite mad and certainly dangerous." Rimington alleged that Wright was a disruptive and lazy officer, who as special advisor to the Director-General had a habit of taking case files that interested him from other officers, failing to return them to their proper place, and failing to write up any interviews he conducted.

Wright's case against Hollis was re-stated by Chapman Pincher in his book, Treachery: Betrayals, Blunders, and Cover-ups: Six Decades of Espionage Against America and Great Britain (2009). But in its obituary of Pincher in 2014, The Times discredited the journalist's theory ("Paranoia Hollisiensis") and asserted that Hollis had not been a Soviet spy.

== Retirement, Spycatcher publication, and later life ==
Upon his retirement in 1976, Wright was denied a full pension on a technicality and emigrated to the town of Cygnet, Tasmania, Australia, where he bred Arabian horses.

In a bid to quell rumours that he had been the "fifth man" of the Cambridge Five, Victor Rothschild, 3rd Baron Rothschild paid Wright's airfare from Australia to meet with Pincher in writing Their Trade Is Treachery (1982). Wright received royalties of £30,000 for this collaboration.

After Heinemann announced the release of Spycatcher in 1985, the British government in 1985 attempted to ban its publication in Australia. In 1987, the Supreme Court of New South Wales ruled against the British government, Wright being represented in court by Malcolm Turnbull, later prime minister of Australia. Turnbull's tough questioning of Robert Armstrong, Thatcher's cabinet secretary, led Armstrong to admit in court that a letter he had written that was presented in Wright's book was ″economical with the truth″. The subsequent appeals against the decision were definitively dismissed in 1988, the High Court of Australia concluding in its decision on the case: ″[...] The appellant's claim for protection (whether injunctive or by way of accounts or damages) ought to have been refused simply on the ground that the Court would not, in the absence of statutory direction, protect the intelligence secrets and confidential political information of the United Kingdom Government.″ By then, the US edition of Spycatcher was already an international best-seller. The book sold nearly two million copies and made Wright a millionaire.

According to the documents released in 2015, the Australian government, then led by Bob Hawke, heeded the advice from British counterparts and lent support to the UK government's bid to suppress publication, despite being aware that Australia's national security was not ″directly threatened″ by Wright's manuscript. A memorandum prepared by the Department of the Prime Minister and Cabinet said among other things: ″The British are seeking to avoid discussion of any of Wright's specific allegations, arguing that, for the purposes of the trial, they can all be assumed to be true and even then Wright's breach of confidentiality would be a breach of contract and inequitable.″

In the opinion of the official historian of MI5, Christopher Andrew, Turnbull's ″brilliant″ conduct of the Spycatcher case humiliated the British establishment and triggered much-needed reform in the intelligence services. In 2011, Turnbull said that ″Margaret Thatcher's iron will made Spycatcher a global bestseller″. The affair influenced the enactment of the official secrets legislation of 1989 by hastening it and probably making its provisions more severe. In 1991, the European Court of Human Rights found that the attempts of the British government to ban the book had violated the right of the author to freedom of speech.

The accuracy of various allegations made in Spycatcher was questioned in a review published by the Center for the Study of Intelligence, an in-house think tank for the CIA. While admitting (on page 42) that the book included "factual data", the document stated that it was also "filled with [unspecified] errors, exaggerations, bogus ideas, and self-inflation". The review added (on page 45) that "Gen. Oleg Kalugin, former Chief of Counterintelligence" had confirmed to Wright that Hollis had not worked for the KGB but did not include a discussion of the possibility that Hollis might have worked with the GRU.

Wright went on to publish The Encyclopaedia of Espionage in 1991 and reportedly was writing a fictional spy thriller at the time of his death on 26 April 1995, aged 78. The obituary in The Independent opined: ″No British intelligence officer other than Kim Philby caused more mayhem within Britain's secret services and more trouble for British politicians than Peter Wright.″

== See also ==
- Julia Pirie

== Works cited ==
- Penrose, Barrie & Freeman, Simon (1987), Conspiracy of Silence: The Secret Life of Anthony Blunt, New York: Farrar Straus Giroux.
- Pincher, Chapman (2009). Treachery: Betrayals, Blunders, and Cover-ups: Six Decades of Espionage Against America and Great Britain. New York: Random House. ISBN 978-1-4000-6807-4. 2011, Revised edition in the UK by Mainstream. ISBN 978-1-84596-769-7.
- Turnbull, Malcolm (1989), The Spycatcher Trial: The Scandal Behind the #1 Best Seller, Topsfield, Massachusetts: Salem House Publishers, Mass Market Paperback; ISBN 1863300082.
- West, Nigel (1987). Mole Hunt. London: Weidenfeld & Nicolson ISBN 0340419849. Nigel West is the pen-name of Rupert Allason.
- Wright, Peter (1987). Spycatcher: The Candid Autobiography of a Senior Intelligence Officer. New York and London: Viking Penguin. ISBN 0670820555.
