= Christopher Andrew (historian) =

British historian (born 1941)

Christopher Andrew FRHistS
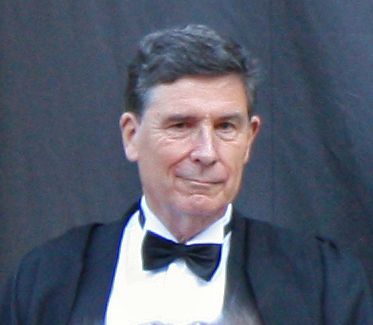
- Andrew in 2008
- Born: Christopher Maurice Andrew; 23 July 1941 (age 84)
- Education: Corpus Christi College, Cambridge (MA, PhD)
- Occupation: Secret Intelligence Historian
- Known for: Official Historian of the Security Service (MI5)

Christopher Maurice Andrew (born 23 July 1941) is an Emeritus Professor of Modern and Contemporary History at the University of Cambridge with an interest in international relations and in particular the history of intelligence services.

Andrew is a former Chair of the History Faculty at Cambridge University, Official Historian of the Security Service (MI5), Honorary Air Commodore of 7006 (VR) Intelligence Squadron in the Royal Auxiliary Air Force, Chairman of the Cambridge Intelligence Seminar, and former Visiting Professor at Harvard, Toronto and Canberra. Andrew served as co-editor of Intelligence and National Security, and a presenter of BBC radio and TV documentaries, including the Radio Four series What If?. His twelve previous books include a number of studies on the use and abuse of secret intelligence in modern history.

== Life ==
Andrew was educated at Norwich School, where he is now a governor. He read history at Corpus Christi College, Cambridge, graduating with MA and PhD degrees. He has been a fellow of the college since 1967.

Andrew studied under the historian and wartime cryptanalyst Sir Harry Hinsley, in common with fellow historian Peter Hennessy. Former students of Andrew, including Peter Jackson, Tim Edwards, David Gioe, Larry Valero and Wesley Wark, now staff the intelligence studies and intelligence history posts in universities around the English-speaking world, and many others such as Thomas Maguire and Christian Schlaepfer continue to work in intelligence related positions in both government and private industry.

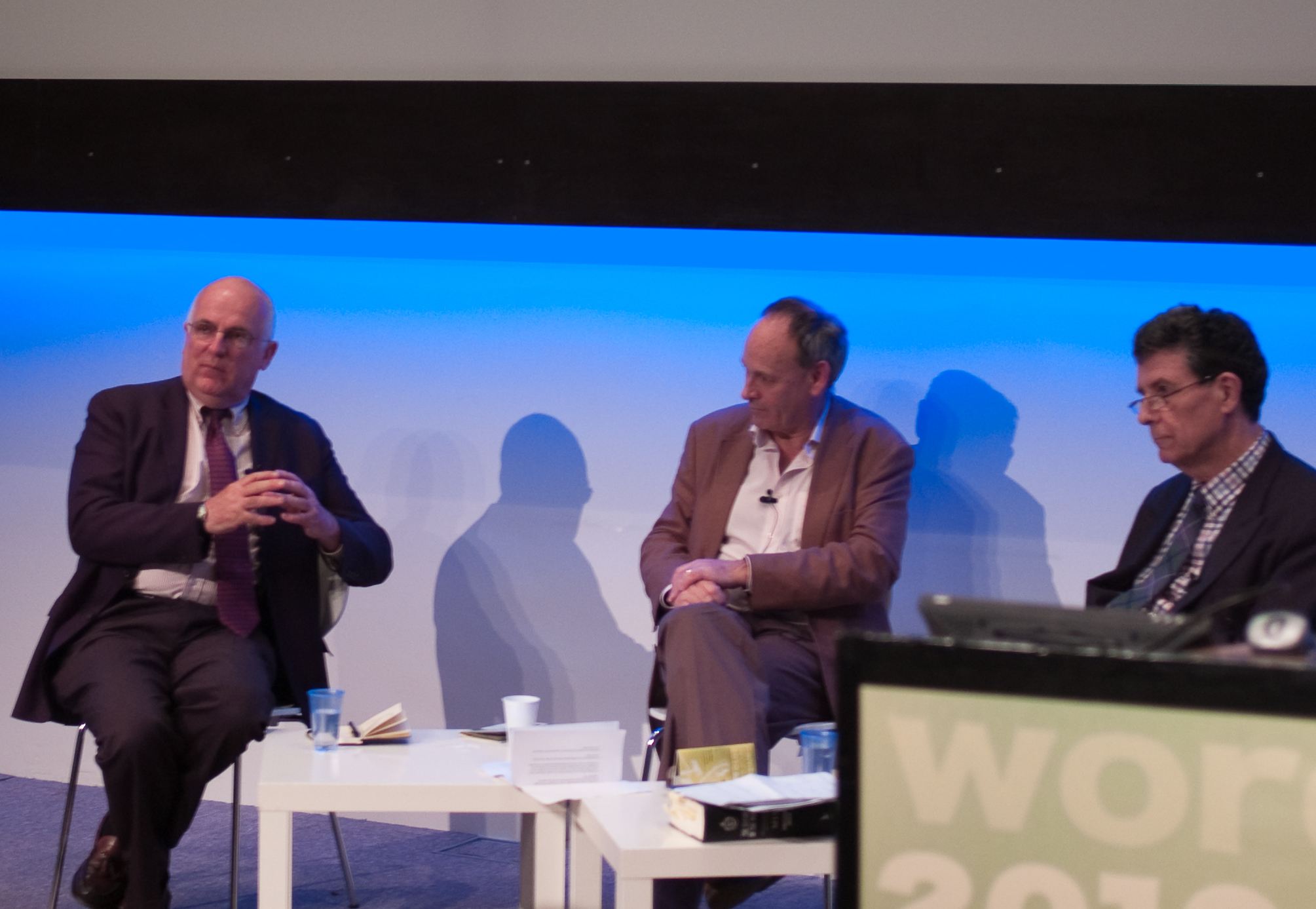
Andrew (right) with Sir Richard Dearlove (left), former Chief of MI6

Andrew produced two studies in collaboration with two defectors and former KGB officers: Oleg Gordievsky and Vasili Mitrokhin. The first of these works, KGB: The Inside Story was a scholarly work on the history of KGB actions against Western governments produced from archival and open sources, with the critical addition of information from the KGB defector Gordievsky.

Andrew's two most detailed works about the KGB were produced in collaboration with the KGB defector and archivist Mitrokhin, who over the course of several years recopied vast numbers of KGB archive documents as they were being moved for long storage. Exfiltrated by the Secret Intelligence Service in 1992, Mitrokhin and his documents were made available to Andrew after an initial and thorough review by the security services. Both volumes, the 1999 The Sword and the Shield: The Mitrokhin Archive and the Secret History of the KGB and the 2005 edition The World Was Going Our Way: The KGB and the Battle for the Third World (both volumes were simply titled The Mitrokhin Archive during their UK publication), resulted in some public scandal as they revealed the names of former KGB agents and collaborators in government, industry and private life around the world. A revelation in 1999 was that Melita Norwood, then long retired, had passed information about the development of nuclear weapons and other intelligence to the KGB for several decades.

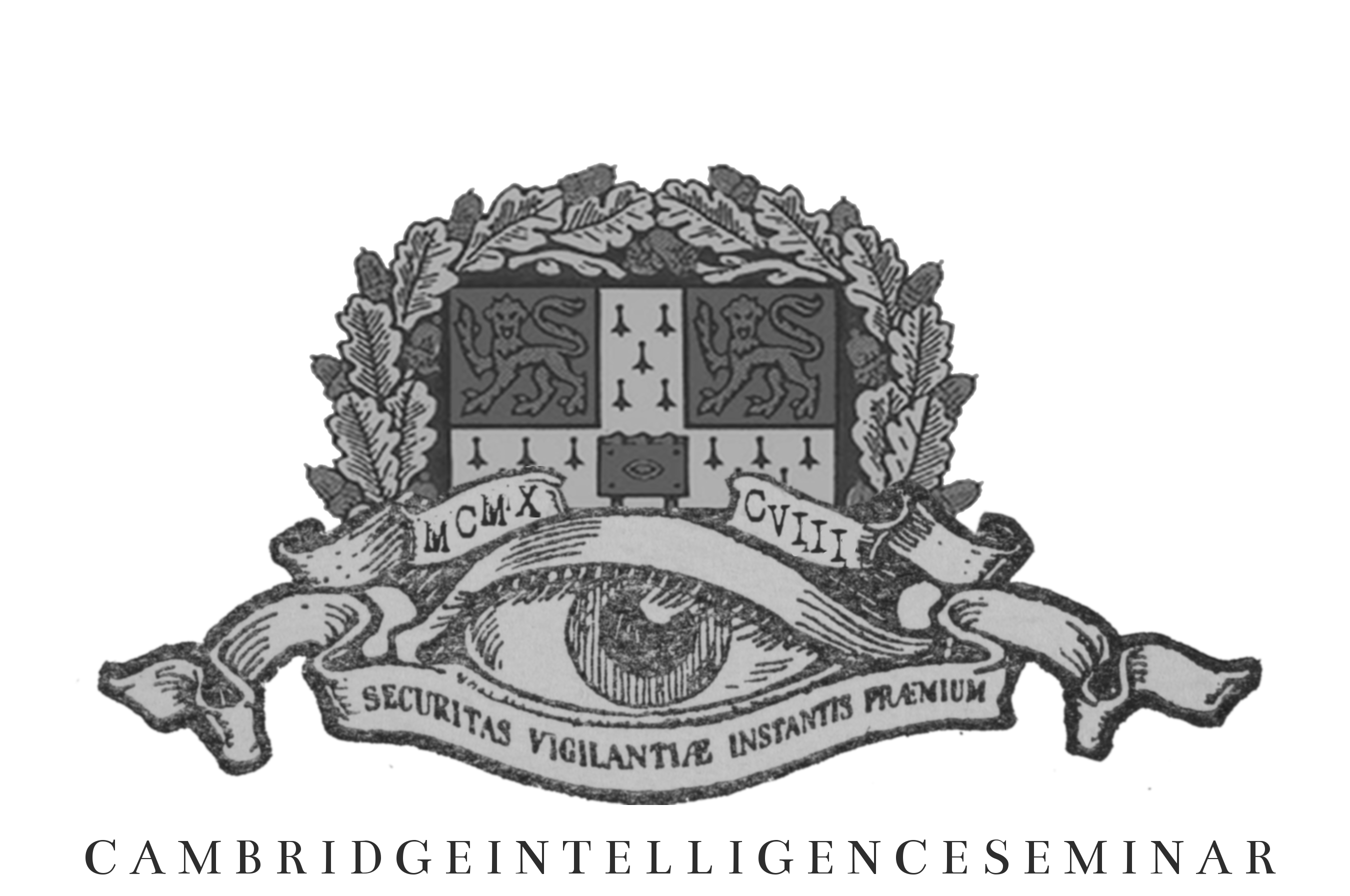
The Cambridge Intelligence Seminar

The Cambridge Intelligence Seminar, chaired by Andrew (and founded by his late mentor Harry Hinsley), convenes regularly at Corpus Christi College, Cambridge. Active and former senior members of various intelligence services around the world participate in the discussions, with most participants made up of Andrew's graduate students, fellow historians and other academics. At these meetings, detailed analysis of various past and present intelligence affairs is discussed under the Chatham House Rule with the confidence that it will not be attributed to a person or organisation. Andrew is on the editorial board of the Journal of Intelligence and Terrorism Studies.

In February 2003, Andrew accepted the post of official historian for the Security Service MI5 to write an official history of the service due for its centenary in 2009. The appointment, which entailed Andrew's enrolment into the Security Service, was criticised by some historians and commentators, that he was too close to MI5 to be impartial and that his link with the Service (formalised with his privileged access to the defectors Gordievsky and Mitrokhin) made him a "court historian", instead of an objective scholar. Persistent, if unfounded, rumours that Andrew was "MI5's main recruiter in Cambridge" have done little to quieten critics. Andrew's response to the criticisms has been that he cannot afford to be biased towards the service. He said, "Posterity and postgraduates are breathing down my neck".

== Honours, decorations, awards and distinctions ==
- Fellow of the Royal Historical Society
- Chair of the British Intelligence Study Group
- Co-founding editor of Intelligence and National Security
- Honorary doctorate in strategic intelligence from the US National Defense University

== Select bibliography ==
- Théophile Delcassé and the Making of the Entente Cordiale (1968)
- France Overseas: The Great War and the Climax of French Imperial Expansion (1981) (with A.S. Kanya-Forstner)
- The Missing Dimension: Governments and Intelligence Communities in the Twentieth Century (1984) (with David Dilks)
- Secret Service: The Making of the British Intelligence Community (1985)
- Her Majesty's Secret Service:The Making of the British Intelligence Community (American Edition 1986,1987)
- Codebreaking and Signals Intelligence (1986)
- Intelligence and International Relations 1900–1945 (1987) (with Jeremy Noakes)
- KGB: The Inside Story of its Foreign Operations from Lenin to Gorbachev (1990) (with Oleg Gordievsky)
- Instructions from The Centre: Top Secret Files on KGB Foreign Operations 1975–1985 (1991) (published in the USA as: Comrade Kryuchkov's Instructions) (with Oleg Gordievsky)
- More Instructions from The Centre: Top Secret Files on KGB Global Operations 1975–1985 (1992) (with Oleg Gordievsky)
- Comrade Kryuchkov's Instructions: Top Secret Files on KGB Foreign Operations, 1975–1985 (1994)
- For The President's Eyes Only: Secret Intelligence and the American Presidency from Washington to Bush (1995)
- Eternal Vigilance? Fifty Years of the CIA (1997) (with Rhodri Jeffreys-Jones)
- —; Mitrokhin, Vasili (27 July 2000). The Mitrokhin Archive: The KGB in Europe and the West. Allen Lane History. Vol. 1. Penguin Books. ISBN 0-14-028487-7. OCLC 42606302. OL 7352280M – via Internet Archive.
- The Mitrokhin Archive. Vol. II: The KGB and the World (2005) (with Vasili Mitrokhin)
- The Defence of the Realm: The Authorized History of MI5 (2009) ISBN 978-0-307-26363-6
- The Secret World: A History of Intelligence (2018) ISBN 978-0-300-23844-0
- The Spy Who Came in From the Circus: The Secret Life of Cyril Bertram Mills (2024) ISBN 978-1-785-90821-7
