= Cambridge Five =

British ring of spies for the Soviet Union

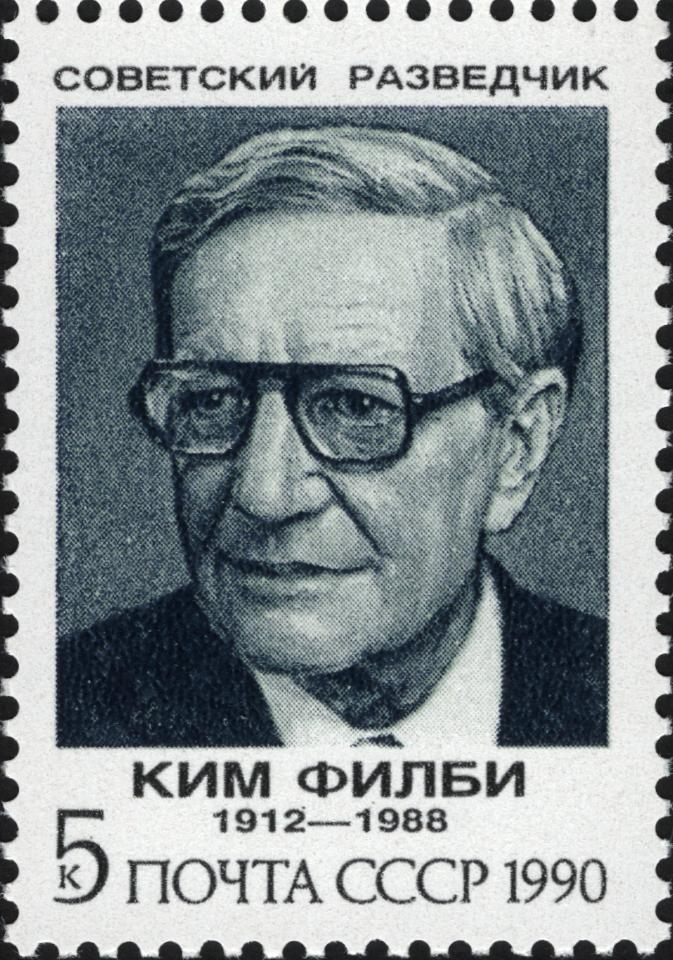
Kim Philby, as depicted on a Soviet Union stamp

The Cambridge Five was a spy ring in the United Kingdom that passed information to the Soviet Union during the Second World War and the Cold War and was active from the 1930s until at least the early 1950s. None of the known members were ever prosecuted for spying. The number and membership of the ring emerged slowly, from the 1950s onwards.

The general public first became aware of the conspiracy in 1951 after the sudden flight of Donald Maclean (1913–1983, codename Homer) and Guy Burgess (1911–1963, codename Hicks) to the Soviet Union. Suspicion immediately fell on Kim Philby (1912–1988, codenames Sonny, Stanley), who eventually fled to the Soviet Union in 1963. Following Philby's flight, British intelligence obtained confessions from Anthony Blunt (1907–1983, codename Johnson) and then John Cairncross (1913–1995, codename Liszt), who have come to be seen as the last two of a group of five. Their involvement was kept secret for many years: until 1979 for Blunt, and 1990 for Cairncross. The moniker "Cambridge Four" evolved to become the Cambridge Five after Cairncross was added.

The group were recruited by the NKVD during their education at the University of Cambridge in the 1930s, but the exact timing is debated. Blunt claimed they were not recruited as agents until after they had graduated. A Fellow of Trinity College, Blunt was several years older than Burgess, Maclean and Philby; he acted as a talent-spotter and recruiter.

The five were drawn to the Marxist–Leninist ideology of Soviet communism. All pursued successful careers in branches of the British government. They passed large amounts of intelligence to the Soviets, so much so that the KGB became suspicious that at least some of it was false. Perhaps as important as the specific state secrets was the demoralising effect to the British establishment of their slow unmasking and the mistrust in British security this caused in the United States.

== Membership ==
The five supplied intelligence to the Soviet Union under their NKVD controller, Yuri Modin, who later reported that Soviet intelligence mistrusted the Cambridge double agents during the Second World War and had difficulty believing that the men would have access to top secret documents; they were particularly suspicious of Harold "Kim" Philby, wondering how he could have become a British intelligence officer given his communist past. According to one later report, "About half the documents the British spies sent to Moscow were never even read" due to this distrust. Nonetheless, the Soviets received a great deal of secret information—1,771 documents from Blunt, 4,605 from Burgess, 4,593 from MacLean and 5,832 from Cairncross—from 1941 until 1945.

=== Donald Maclean and Guy Burgess ===
Donald Maclean and Guy Burgess met as students at the University of Cambridge in the early 1930s. Both of them being ideologically opposed to capitalism, they were recruited by Soviet intelligence operatives and became undercover agents. Maclean began delivering information to the Soviet operatives as a member of the Foreign Office in 1934. Burgess also began supplying information from various positions between 1936 and 1944, first as a BBC correspondent, then as an active member of British intelligence, and then finally as a member of the Foreign Office.

Maclean and Burgess were reportedly seen by their Soviet handlers as "hopeless drunks" as they had a hard time keeping their secret occupations to themselves. It is said that Burgess, while leaving a pub highly intoxicated, accidentally dropped one of the secret files he had just taken from the Foreign Office, thereby potentially jeopardizing his secret identity. Maclean was also known to have leaked information about his secret activities to his brother and to close friends. Although they struggled to keep secrets, that did not stop them from delivering information; Burgess reportedly handed about 389 top secret documents over to the Soviets within the early part of 1945, along with an additional 168 documents in December 1949.

Between 1934 and 1951, Maclean passed numerous secrets to Moscow. The lack of detection was due to the refusal of British intelligence to listen to warnings from the US, "even after the FBI had established that an agent code-named Homer had been operating inside the British embassy in Washington during the war", according to a review of MacLean's biography by Roland Philipps.

Philby, when he was posted in the British embassy in Washington after the war, learned that American and British authorities were searching for a mole (cryptonym Homer) in the British embassy who was passing information to the Soviets, relying on material uncovered by the Venona project. He further learned one of the suspects was Maclean. Realizing he had to act fast, he ordered Burgess, who was also on the embassy staff and living with Philby, to warn Maclean in England. Burgess was recalled from the US because of "bad behaviour" and, upon reaching London, warned Maclean.

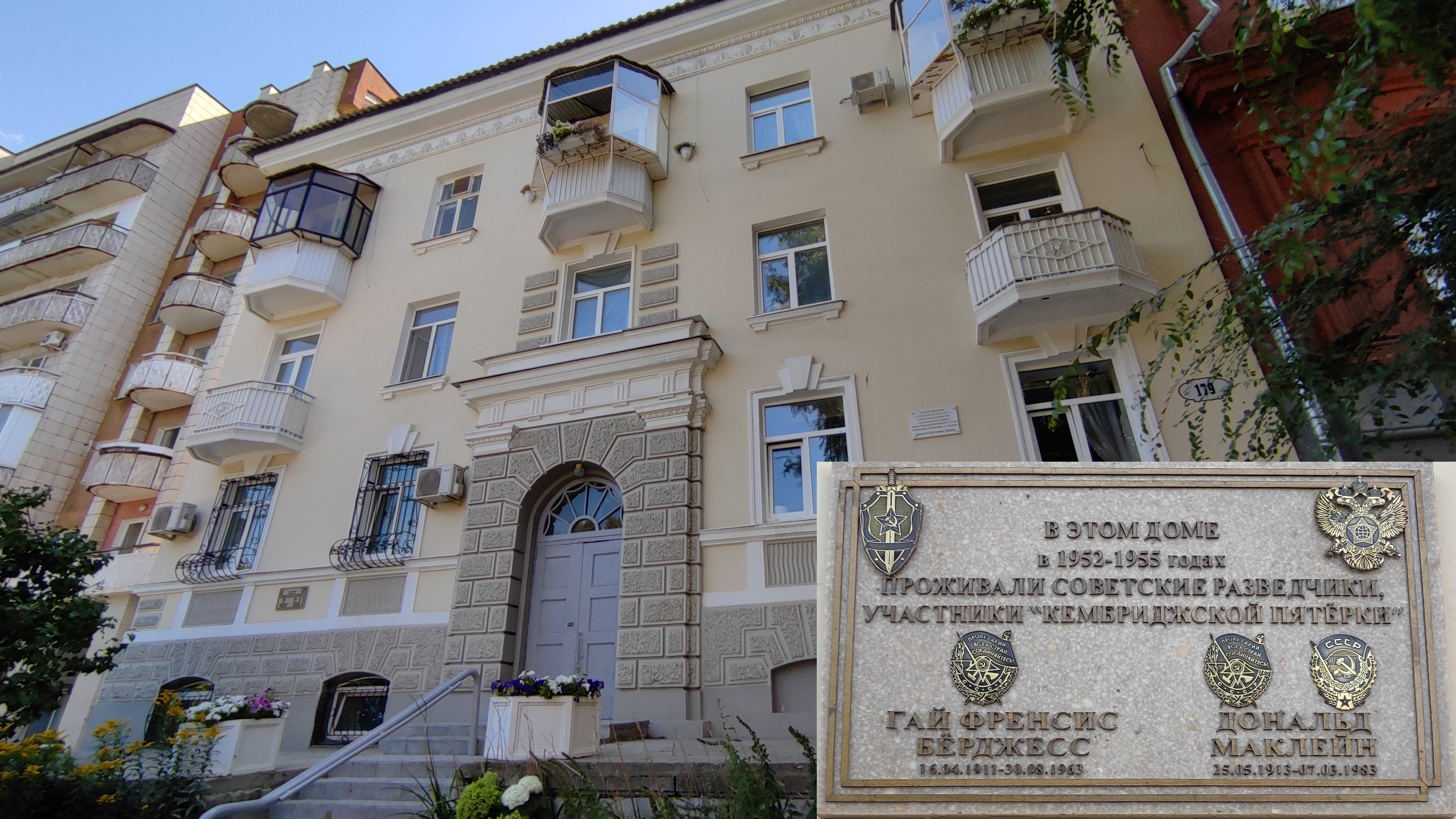
House 179 at Frunze Street, Samara, where Burgess and Maclean lived covertly in 1952–1955, commemorative plaque later installed

Burgess and Maclean disappeared in the summer of 1951 and spent most of the next four years living covertly in Kuybyshev, Russian SFSR. Their whereabouts were unclear for some time and their defection was not confirmed until 1956 when the two appeared at a press conference in Moscow. Though Burgess was not supposed to defect at the same time as Maclean, it has been claimed that he had been ordered to do so by his controllers in Moscow. The move immediately cast suspicion upon Philby because of his close association with Burgess; many speculate that had the defection proceeded differently, Philby could have climbed even higher within British intelligence.

In 2019, Russia honoured Burgess and Maclean in a ceremony; a plaque was attached to the building where they had lived in the 1950s. The head of Russia's Foreign Intelligence Service (SVR) praised the duo on social media for "having supplied Soviet intelligence with the most important information for more than 20 years, [making] a significant contribution to the victory over fascism, the protection of our strategic interests and ensuring the safety of our country".

A book review in The Guardian of Stewart Purvis and Jeff Hulbert's biography of Burgess included this conclusion: "[leaving] us all the more astonished that such a smelly, scruffy, lying, gabby, promiscuous, drunken slob could penetrate the heart of the establishment without anyone apparently noticing that he was also a Soviet masterspy". Andrew Lownie's biography of Burgess, Stalin's Englishman: The Lives of Guy Burgess, argues that he was perhaps the most influential of all the members of the Cambridge Five.

=== Kim Philby ===
Harold "Kim" Philby was a senior officer in Britain's Secret Intelligence Service, known as MI6, who began to spy for the Soviet Union in 1934. He was known for passing more than 900 British documents over to the NKVD and its successor, the KGB. He served as a double agent.

After the flight of Maclean and Burgess, an investigation of Philby found several suspicious matters but nothing for which he could be prosecuted. Nevertheless, he was forced to resign from MI6. In 1955 he was named in the press, with questions also raised in the House of Commons, as chief suspect for "the Third Man" and he called a press conference to deny the allegation. That same year, Philby was ruled out as a suspect when British Foreign Secretary Harold Macmillan cleared him of all charges.

In the later 1950s, Philby left the Secret Service and began working as a journalist in the Middle East, writing for The Economist and The Observer. MI6 then re-employed him at around the same time to provide reports from that region.

In 1961, defector Anatoliy Golitsyn provided information which pointed to Philby. An MI6 officer and friend of Philby from his earlier MI6 days, Nicholas Elliott, was sent in 1963 to interview him in Beirut and reported that Philby seemed to know he was coming (indicating the presence of yet another mole in MI6). Nonetheless, Philby allegedly confessed to Elliott.

Shortly afterwards, apparently fearing he might be abducted in Lebanon, Philby defected to the Soviet Union under cover of night aboard a Soviet freighter. For the first seven years in Moscow, he was under virtual house arrest since the Soviets were concerned that he might defect back to the West. According to an article in The New York Times, he was given no rank nor an office. In fact, "for the most part, Philby was frozen out, his suggestions ignored ... This ruined his life". After his death, however, Philby was awarded a number of medals by the Soviets.

=== Anthony Blunt ===
Anthony Blunt was a former Surveyor of the King's Pictures and later Queen's Pictures for the royal art collection. He served as an MI5 member and supplied secret information to the KGB, while also providing warnings to fellow agents of certain counterintelligence that could potentially endanger them.

In 1964, MI5 received information from the American Michael Whitney Straight pointing to Blunt's espionage; the two had known each other at Cambridge some thirty years before and Blunt recruited Straight as a spy.

Blunt was interrogated by MI5 and confessed in exchange for immunity from prosecution. As he was – by 1964 – without access to classified information, he had secretly been granted immunity by the Attorney General, in exchange for revealing everything he knew. Peter Wright, one of Blunt's interrogators, describes in his book Spycatcher how Blunt was evasive and only made admissions grudgingly, when confronted with the undeniable.

By 1979, Blunt was publicly accused of being a Soviet agent by investigative journalist Andrew Boyle, in his book Climate of Treason. In November 1979, Prime Minister Margaret Thatcher admitted to the House of Commons that Blunt had confessed to being a Soviet spy fifteen years previously.

The term "Five" began to be used in 1961, when KGB defector Anatoliy Golitsyn named Maclean and Burgess as part of a "Ring of Five", with Philby a "probable" third, alongside two other agents whom he did not know.

Of all the information provided by Golitsyn, the only item that was ever independently confirmed was the Soviet affiliation of John Vassall. Vassall was a relatively low-ranking spy who some researchers believe may have been sacrificed to protect a more senior one.

At the time of Golitsyn's defection, Philby had already been accused in the press and was living in Beirut, Lebanon, a country with no extradition agreement with Britain. Select members of MI5 and MI6 already knew Philby to be a spy from Venona project decryptions. Golitsyn also provided other information, such as the claim that Harold Wilson (then Prime Minister) was a KGB agent.

Golitsyn's reliability remains a controversial subject and as such, there is little certainty of the number of agents he assigned to the Cambridge spy ring. To add to the confusion, when Blunt finally confessed, he named several other people as having been recruited by him.

Blunt wrote his memoirs but insisted they not be released until 25 years after his death. They were made public by the British Library in 2009. The manuscript indicated that he regretted having passed information to the Soviets because of the way it eventually affected his life, that he believed that the government would never reveal his treachery and that he had dismissed suicide as "cowardly". Christopher Andrew felt that the regret was shallow, and that he found an "unwillingness to acknowledge the evil he had served in spying for Stalin".

=== John Cairncross ===
John Cairncross was known as a British literary scholar until he was later identified as a Soviet atomic spy. While a civil servant in the Foreign Office, he was recruited in 1937 by James Klugmann to become a Soviet spy. He moved to the Treasury in 1938 but transferred once again to the Cabinet Office in 1940 where he served as the private secretary of Sir Maurice Hankey, the Chancellor of the Duchy of Lancaster at that time. In May 1942, he transferred to the British cryptanalysis agency, the Government Code and Cypher School, at Bletchley Park and then, in 1943, to MI6. Following World War II, it is said that Cairncross leaked information regarding the new NATO alliance to the Soviets.

On the basis of the information provided by Golitsyn, speculations raged on for many years as to the identity of the "Fifth Man". The journalistic popularity of this phrase owes something to the unrelated novels The Third Man and The Tenth Man, written by Graham Greene who, coincidentally, worked with Philby and Cairncross during the Second World War.

Cairncross confessed to having been a spy for the Soviets in a 1964 meeting with MI6 that was kept secret for some years. He was given immunity from prosecution.

The public became aware of his treachery in December 1979, however, when Cairncross made a public confession to journalist Barrie Penrose. The news was widely publicized leading many to surmise that he was in fact the "fifth man"; that was confirmed in 1989 by KGB agent Oleg Gordievsky who had defected to Britain.

His designation as the fifth man was also confirmed in former KGB agent Yuri Modin's book published in 1994: My Five Cambridge Friends: Burgess, Maclean, Philby, Blunt, and Cairncross.

Cairncross is not always considered to have been part of the "Ring of Five". Though a student at the University of Cambridge, he knew only Blunt, who by then was teaching modern languages. By 1934, when Cairncross arrived at Cambridge, the other three members of the ring had already graduated.

The most important agent talent spotted by Blunt was the Fifth Man, the Trinity undergraduate John Cairncross. Together with Philby, Burgess, Blunt and Maclean, he is remembered by the Center (Moscow KGB Headquarters) as one of the Magnificent Five, the ablest group of foreign agents in KGB history. Though Cairncross is the last of the five to be publicly identified, he successfully penetrated a greater variety of the corridors of power and intelligence than any of the other four.

— Christopher Andrew and Oleg Gordievsky, KGB, The Inside Story. "Chapter 6: Sigint, Agent Penetration, and the Magnificent Five from Cambridge (1930–39)"

This reference suggests the KGB itself recognized Cairncross as the fifth man (found by Gordievsky while doing research on the history of the KGB).

A few sources, however, believe that the "fifth man" was Victor Rothschild, 3rd Baron Rothschild. In his book The Fifth Man, Roland Perry asserts this claim. After the book was published, former KGB controller Yuri Modin denied ever having named Rothschild as "any kind of Soviet agent". Modin's own book's title clarifies the name of all five of the Cambridge spy group: My Five Cambridge Friends: Burgess, Maclean, Philby, Blunt, and Cairncross by Their KGB Controller. Since Rothschild had died prior to the publication of the Perry book, the family was unable to start a libel action.

In a 1991 interview with The Mail on Sunday, Cairncross explained how he had forwarded information to Moscow during WWII and boasted that it "helped the Soviets to win that battle (the Battle of Kursk) against the Germans". Cairncross did not view himself as one of the Cambridge Five, insisting that the information he sent to Moscow was not harmful to Britain and that he had remained loyal to his homeland. Unlike many other spies, he was never charged with passing information to Moscow.

=== Attempted coverup ===
For unknown reasons, Prime Minister Alec Douglas-Home was not advised of Anthony Blunt's spying, although the Queen and Home Secretary Henry Brooke were informed. It was only in November 1979 that the PM Margaret Thatcher formally advised Parliament of Blunt's treachery and the immunity deal that had been arranged 15 years earlier.

A 2015 article in The Guardian discussed "400 top-secret documents which have been released at the National Archives" and indicated that MI5 and MI6 had worked diligently to prevent information about the five from being disclosed, "to the British public and even to the US government". A 2016 review of a new book about Burgess added that "more than 20% of files relating to the spies, most of whom defected more than 50 years ago, remain closed". In conclusion, the review stated that "the Foreign Office, MI6 and MI5 all have an interest in covering up, to protect themselves from huge embarrassment" and that "more taxpayers' money is spent by Whitehall officials in the futile attempt to keep the files under lock and key for ever".

Under the 30-year rule, the 400 documents should normally have been made available years earlier. It was particularly surprising that 20 percent of the information was redacted or not released. A news item at the time stated that "it is clear the full story of the Cambridge Spies has not yet emerged". A summary of the documents indicated that they showed that "inaction and incompetence on the part of the authorities enabled Guy Burgess and Donald Maclean to make their escape to Moscow".

Additional secret files were released to the National Archives in 2020. They indicated that the government had intentionally conducted a campaign to keep Kim Philby's spying confidential "to minimise political embarrassment" and prevented the publication of his memoirs, according to a report by The Guardian. Nonetheless, the information was publicized in 1967 when Philby granted an interview to journalist Murray Sayle of The Times. Philby confirmed that he had worked for the KGB and that "his purpose in life was to destroy imperialism". This revelation raised concerns that Blunt's spying would also be revealed to the public.

=== Alleged additional members ===
Blunt and Burgess were both members of the University Pitt Club as well as the Cambridge Apostles, exclusive secret societies at Cambridge University. Other Apostles have been suspected of having spied for the Soviets.

Some researchers believe the spy ring had more than five, or different, members. Several of the following have been alleged to be possible Soviet spies:

- Roger Hollis, the Director-General of MI5 from 1956 to 1965, was accused of being the (then) Fifth Man by his subordinate Peter Wright in his notorious tell-all autobiography Spycatcher in 1987, 14 years after Hollis's death. Journalist Chapman Pincher had made the same allegation in 1981. These allegations have been dismissed by some other journalists and historians, although the issue remains debated and has not been settled.
- Baron Rothschild was named by Roland Perry in his book The Fifth Man. According to Spycatcher, Rothschild had been friendly with Burgess as an undergraduate, and had originally owned the lease on a house off Welbeck Street, No. 5 Bentinck Street, where Blunt and Burgess both lived during the war. This was supposedly confirmed by Yuri Modin, the alleged controller of the five, who—according to Perry—had claimed Cairncross was never part of the group. However, in reviewing Perry's book, commentator Sheila Kerr pointed out that as soon as the book came out, Modin denied Perry's version of their discussions (having already stated that the fifth man was Cairncross), and concluded that "Perry's case against Rothschild is unconvincing because of dubious sources and slack methods".
- Michael Straight was a suspected Cambridge Apostle and self-confessed spy.
- Leonard Henry (Leo) Long was accused by Blunt in 1964. Blunt claimed to have recruited Long to the Communist cause while Blunt was his tutor at Cambridge. Long served as an intelligence officer with MI14 from 1940 to 1945, and later with the British element of the Allied Control Commission in Occupied Germany from 1945 to 1952. Long passed analyses but not original material relating to the Eastern Front to Blunt. Blunt also was associated with other Cambridge persons subsequently involved in espionage (Michael Straight, Peter Ashby, Brian Simon) but they are generally considered as minor figures compared to the "Cambridge Five".
- Guy Liddell was an MI5 officer and nearly rose to become director of the service but was passed over because of rumours he was a double agent; he took early retirement from MI5 in 1953 after he was investigated for his personal links to Philby. He was accused of having been the "fifth man" by Goronwy Rees as part of Rees' confession in 1979. The academic consensus is that he was naïve in his friendships rather than a spy.
- Andrew Gow: in his memoirs published in 2012, Brian Sewell suggested that Gow was the "fifth man" and spymaster of the group. This suggestion, however, had already been rebutted by Anthony Powell.
- Wilfrid Basil Mann: Mann had been accused on several occasions of being the "fifth man", based on rumoured former work at the Embassy and the resemblance between his name and the "Basil" of Boyle's codename. In his memoirs, Mann argued using contemporary correspondence, publications, and verified passport entries that he was incapable of having worked with Donald Maclean in the British Embassy. As part of his hiring at the Bureau of Standards, Mann underwent intense security screening and received a top-level "Q" clearance from the U.S. Atomic Energy Commission.

== In popular culture ==
Books

- From Russia with Love (1957) by Ian Fleming contains several references to Burgess and Maclean while Soviet characters discuss then-contemporary espionage-related scandals. In Chapter 11, James Bond himself says that what is needed in the atomic age is the 'intellectual spy', before mentioning the treacherous pair directly, though admits to only doing so in order to annoy a superior.
- Tinker Tailor Soldier Spy (New York 1974); John le Carré's novelisation of his experiences of the revelations in the 1950s and the 1960s which exposed the Cambridge Five traitors.
- The Fourth Protocol, a 1984 novel by Frederick Forsyth, uses a fictionalised Kim Philby as a central character, who conspires to smuggle a portable nuclear weapon into Britain.
- A Perfect Spy, by John le Carré (New York 1986). Events in the life of the character Magnus Pym are partly based upon the life and career of Kim Philby.
- The Untouchable (1997) by John Banville. The character Victor Maskell seems to be a combination of Anthony Blunt and poet Louis MacNeice.
- Burgess, Maclean and Philby appear in the Doctor Who Eighth Doctor Adventures novel Endgame (2000) dealing with their defection to Russia.
- Kim Philby appears as one of the central antagonists in William F. Buckley's 2005 novel Last Call for Blackford Oakes.
- In Alan Moore's 2007 graphic novel The League of Extraordinary Gentlemen: Black Dossier, there appears a Cambridge Five analogue consisting of the Famous Five from Greyfriars School, including Harry Wharton, who became Big Brother; Bob Kim Cherry (named after Kim Philby), who was also known as Harry Lime and subsequently M or Mother; Francis Alexander Waverly (possibly formerly known as Frank Nugent); and Sir John Night (possibly formerly known as John Bull).
- The plot of Charles Cumming's 2011 novel, The Trinity Six, is built on the premise that there was a sixth spy and that his existence is being covered up by MI6.
- Philby appears in The Other Woman (2018) of the Gabriel Allon series by novelist Daniel Silva.

Television

- Dennis Potter's television play Traitor (1971) is a spy drama television film that features a central character called Adrian Harris (John Le Mesurier) being interviewed in his Moscow flat by western newspaper reporters, eager to get the story on his defection. Harris appears to be a composite of Philby, Burgess and Maclean. Potter later returned to similar territory with Blade on the Feather (1980), inspired by the unmasking of Anthony Blunt, although in this drama the protagonist Jason Cavendish (Donald Pleasence) is clearly modelled after Philby. Philby is later name-checked as the sports reporter on The Daily Telegraph in Potter's Lipstick on Your Collar (1993), and appears to be giving inside tips on horse-races to officials at the War Office.
- Philby, Burgess and Maclean was a 1977 Granada Television drama-documentary for ITV, re-broadcast on BBC Four in 2007, with Derek Jacobi as Burgess.
- Tinker Tailor Soldier Spy, 1979 miniseries adaptation of John le Carré's novel
- "The Death List", episode 3 of series 2 (1981) of Yes Minister mentions Burgess, Maclean and Philby as civil servants who betrayed the country.
- An Englishman Abroad, 1983 dramatisation of Burgess in Russia by Alan Bennett and directed by John Schlesinger. Alan Bates plays Burgess.
- Blunt: the Fourth Man, 1987 television drama with Anthony Hopkins as Guy Burgess and Ian Richardson as Anthony Blunt.
- The Endless Game (1989) featured a character based on Blunt. Anthony Quayle plays Herbert Glanville, an art critic dubbed the Fifth Man of a Cambridge spy ring who made a deal to get immunity from prosecution.
- Cambridge Spies, 2003 BBC drama with Toby Stephens as Kim Philby, Tom Hollander as Guy Burgess, Rupert Penry-Jones as Donald Maclean, Samuel West as Anthony Blunt, and Alastair Galbraith as John Cairncross.
- The Channel 4 education show KNTV (premiered 2006) features a character called Burgess MacPhilbin, who provides information for teenagers in the form of a spy dossier.
- The Hour (2011-12 BBC series of two six-episode seasons)
- Kim Philby: His Most Intimate Betrayal, 2014 BBC docudrama miniseries, produced by Francis Whately, and narrated by Ben Macintyre.
- Samuel West reprises his role as Anthony Blunt from Cambridge Spies in The Crown in 2019, in the season three episode titled "Olding".
- A Spy Among Friends is a fictionalised adaptation of Ben Macintyre's non-fiction book of the same name, a six-part series initially streamed on ITVX in 2022 and broadcast on ITV in 2023. The story, which has been enlarged with imagined scenarios over and above the known history, centres around the 1963 escape by Kim Philby and depicts Macintyre's speculation that Philby was allowed to escape by his friend Nicholas Elliott in return for telling MI6 about Blunt; also that after Philby arrived in Moscow, the CIA's James Jesus Angleton initially believed him to be working for him, Angleton, as a "triple agent". With Guy Pearce as Philby, Damian Lewis as Elliott, Nicholas Rowe as Blunt and Adrian Edmondson as Sir Roger Hollis.

Film

- The Jigsaw Man, 1983 film starring Laurence Olivier and Michael Caine. Caine plays a character named Philip Kimberley who returns to England after his defection.
- Another Country, 1984 adaptation of the play by Julian Mitchell
- A Different Loyalty, 2004 film directed by Marek Kanievska, is inspired by Kim Philby's affair and subsequent marriage to Eleanor Brewer, as well as events leading up to his defection.
- Tinker Tailor Soldier Spy, 2011 adaptation of John le Carré's novel
- The Imitation Game, 2014 biopic of Alan Turing, includes Allen Leech as John Cairncross; Burgess and Maclean are mentioned in passing.

Theatre

- The Old Country, a 1977 play about a fictional Philby-esque spy in exile by Alan Bennett
- Another Country, 1981 play loosely based on Guy Burgess's life by Julian Mitchell
- A Question of Attribution, 1988 dramatization of Blunt's term as Keeper of the Queen's Pictures by Alan Bennett
- Single Spies by Alan Bennett is a 1988 one-volume publication containing An Englishman Abroad and A Question of Attribution, the former adapted for the stage from the television film with its screenplay by Bennett.
- In 2009, Michael Dobbs wrote a short play, Turning Point, for a series of live broadcast TV plays on Sky Arts channel. Based on a 1938 meeting between a young Guy Burgess and Winston Churchill, the play sees Burgess urging Churchill to fight the appeasement policy of the British government. In the live broadcast, Burgess was played by Benedict Cumberbatch.

Music

- "Philby", a 1979 composition from Irish blues-rock musician Rory Gallagher and his album Top Priority.
- "Fellow Traveller", the tenth track from John K. Samson's 2016 second solo album Winter Wheat
- "Cambridge Three", a 2021 single and the fifth track from The Whitlams' 2022 seventh album Sancho; the song is about McLean, Burgess and Philby, as if sung by Blunt.

== See also ==
- Arnold Deutsch
- Theodore Maly
- Yuri Modin
- Portland spy ring
- Jim Skardon
- Bob Stewart
