= The KNTV Show =

UK educational television programme

The KNTV Show is an educational television programme that was broadcast on Channel 4 in the United Kingdom beginning in 2006, which taught about science, and philosophy (on its sister show KNTV - Philosophy).

The show is presented by two animated fictional teenagers from Eastern Europe (specifically the fictional state of "Slabovia", the "last remaining communist state in Europe"), called Kierky and Nietschze, named after Søren Kierkegaard and Friedrich Nietzsche. Among the other recurring characters is the suave English gentleman Burgess MacPhilbin, who presents a series of reports on the given subject of that week's episode in the form of a spy's dossier: his name is actually a reference to 'Cambridge' spies Guy Burgess, Donald Maclean and Kim Philby.

The show is divided between animated parts in which the two teenagers discuss ideas in a humorous manner, and running commentary about science and philosophy over home video clips of people in comical situations, similar to those on You've Been Framed. In this way, the show melds comedy and education into one as form of edutainment.

The show won a BAFTA award in 2006.

== External links and sources ==
- The People's Republic of Slabovia official website
- The SlabPlayer - slabovia.tv Media Player
- Slabovia.tv Wiki site (Not Yet Created)
- IMDB listing for The KNTV Show
- Description of the programme
- Another description
- The KNTV Show - BAFTA award results
- C4 description of KNTV - Philosophy
