= Goronwy Rees =

Welsh journalist, academic and writer (1909–1979)

- Born: Morgan Goronwy Rees; 29 November 1909; Aberystwyth, Wales, United Kingdom
- Died: 12 December 1979 (aged 70); London, United Kingdom
- Education: New College, Oxford; All Souls College
- Occupation: writer
- Years active: 1931–1979
- Employer: The Spectator
- Parent(s): Richard Jenkyn Rees; Apphla Mary James
- Relatives: Richard Geraint Rees (brother)

Morgan Goronwy Rees (29 November 1909 – 12 December 1979) was a Welsh journalist, academic and writer.

== Background ==
Rees was born in Aberystwyth, the son of Apphla Mary James and Richard Jenkyn Rees, a minister of the Tabernacle Calvinistic Methodist Church, and a younger brother of judge Richard Geraint Rees. The family later moved to Roath, Cardiff, and Goronwy was educated at Cardiff High School for Boys. He received three scholarships in 1927 to attend New College, Oxford, where he studied History. In 1931, he became a Fellow of All Souls College.

== Career ==
After leaving university, Rees wrote first for the Manchester Guardian. In 1936, he became assistant editor of The Spectator, for which he travelled to Germany, Russia, Spain, and Czechoslovakia. Though a Marxist during most of the 1930s, the Hitler-Stalin Pact turned him from communism and led him to enlist before the UK entered the war. During World War II, he joined the Royal Artillery and rose to second lieutenant in the Royal Welch Fusiliers. By 1943 he had risen further to the rank of Major on the staff of Lieutenant General Sir Frederick Morgan, COSSAC (Chief of Staff to the Supreme Allied Commander), the office responsible for planning Operation Overlord. After the army, he resumed work at The Spectator. In 1946, he became an administrator for H. Pontifex & Son and may have started working for MI6. Rees's daughter confirms that he worked for MI6 then and until at least 1949: "and in the afternoons he went to 54 Broadway, next door to St. James's Park tube station, the offices of SIS (or MI6), where he worked for the Political Section which [...] assessed and evaluated information".

In 1953, Rees became principal of the University College of Wales in Aberystwyth. In 1956, a series of articles appeared in The People that described their anonymous author as a "Most intimate friend, a man in a high academic position". Guy Burgess appeared in them as a corrupt man, spy, blackmailer, homosexual, and drunk. The Daily Telegraph then revealed Rees was author. The university held an inquiry into the matter. Despite student support, university staff did not support him. Rees resigned before the inquiry ended, thus also ending his academic career. The inquiry's report was very critical of Rees. Moreover, "It turned out that a great many old acquaintances of Burgess and [Donald] Maclean were much more horrified – felt, indeed, much more betrayed – by the fact that the late Goronwy Rees gave a version of their flight to the People than by the flight itself. When Stephen Spender showed the Daily Express a friend’s letter about Burgess, he was held to have disgraced himself."

Rees sat on the Departmental Committee on Homosexual Offences and Prostitution and played an influential role in getting gay men's testimony heard. He spent the last years of his life in Aberystwyth. He wrote a column (signed "R") on current political affairs for Encounter. He also wrote two autobiographies, A Bundle of Sensations (1960) and A Chapter of Accidents (1972).

Rees appears under the name "Eddie" in Elizabeth Bowen's 1938 novel The Death of the Heart (Victoria Glendinning Elizabeth Bowen: Portrait of a Writer).

Michael Williams portrays Rees in the 1985 television movie Blunt: The Fourth Man.

Rees died of cancer on 12 December 1979 at Charing Cross Hospital in London.

== Communism and anti-communism ==
During the 1930s, Rees was a Marxist intellectual. He came into contact with the Cambridge Five spy ring through his friend Guy Burgess.

The Hitler-Stalin Pact led him to take a strong anti-communist stance, which he put into writing by 1948:

"A spectre is haunting Europe." The words are more true today than they were when two hopeful young men wrote them almost exactly one hundred years ago. Today the spectre has ceased to be a bogy. It is a solid, established fact, ruling some 250,000,000 people and preparing, with admirable thoroughness, advanced positions from which it can reach out to extend its rule over Western Europe.

In her memoir, Rees's daughter Jenny Rees wrote that her father was fascinated by the Hiss–Chambers case, which marked a sharp divide intellectually between him and Burgess:

'Hiss was certainly guilty; he was precisely the sort of person who was capable of carrying out the systematic program of espionage which Whittaker Chambers, so improbably as it seemed, had accused him; and only a communist could be capable of such a feat...' But according to Guy, it was Hiss, not Chambers, who deserved the admiration.

Rees seemed acutely conscious of the parallels between Hiss's case and that of the Cambridge Five (specifically Burgess) when he wrote, "I have no intention to be the British Whittaker Chambers". (Others have made the comparison.) He reviewed Chambers's 1952 memoir Witness favorably for The Spectator. At the end of his life he admitted spying for the USSR for a short time, and accused MI5 man Guy Liddell of also being a spy. His son Thomas has said that his father did not admit to being a communist spy, even when he was dying in hospital in 1979. Rees told Andrew Boyle, author of The Climate of Treason, his reflections on his conversations with Burgess at All Souls College. He said he had ridiculed Burgess's claim to be a spy. He also told Boyle that Anthony Blunt was the man to follow. Boyle's revelations in the Daily Mail led Prime Minister Margaret Thatcher to announce to the House of Commons in 1979 that the security services had long known that Blunt was a spy, due to Rees's warnings to the security services the weekend that Burgess and Maclean fled to Russia. Blunt had still been knighted.

In 1999, Vasili Mitrokhin, former KGB member, published the Mitrokhin archives, which included a file on Rees, documenting his recruitment by Burgess at Oxford during the mid-1930s and two code names, "Fleet" and "Gross". The file also says that he supplied no information to the Soviets and abandoned his communist affiliation at the outbreak of World War II.

In her memoir, Jenny Rees writes that while she was visiting Moscow, Oleg Tsarev told her:

"[Rees] did not cooperate. Nothing happened actually." [...] My father was supposed to provide political hearsay but he did not co-operate, and after the Soviet-German pact nothing more was heard from him.

== Works ==
Books

- The Summer Flood (1932)
- Where No Wounds Were (1950)
- A Bundle of Sensations: Sketches in Autobiography (1961)
- Multimillionaires: Six Studies in Wealth (1961)
- The Rhine (1967)
- St Michael: A History of Marks & Spencer (1969)
- The Great Slump: Capitalism in Crisis 1929–1933 (1970) (review)
- Conversations with Kafka by Gustav Janouch (1970) (translator)
- A Chapter of Accidents (1972)
- Brief Encounters (1974)

Articles

New York Review of Books:

- "Inside the Aquarium" (1967)

The Spectator:

- "Pity" (1936)
- "Children From Spain" (1937)
- "In Defence of Welsh Nationalism" (1937)
- "The Unpeopled Spaces" (1937)
- "Standards of Greatness" (1938)
- "The Spectre" (1948)
- "Supreme Commander" (1949)
- "The Informer and the Communist" (1953)

== See also ==
- Guy Burgess
- Whittaker Chambers
- The Spectator
- Aberystwyth University

== Sources ==
- Christopher, Andrew; Vasili Mitrokhin (1999). The Sword and the Shield: The Mitrokhin Archive and the Secret History of the KGB. New York: Basic Books. ISBN 978-0-465-00310-5.
- Rees, Jenny (2000). Looking for Mr. Nobody: The Secret Life of Goronwy Rees. New Brunswick, NJ: Transaction Publishers.

Academic offices
Preceded by Ifor Leslie Evans	Principal of the University College of Wales Aberystwyth; 1953–1957	Succeeded by Sir Thomas Parry
