= Richard Geraint Rees =

British judge

His Honour Judge Richard Geraint Rees
- Born: 5 May 1907; Aberystwyth, Wales
- Died: 27 March 1986 (aged 78); Weybridge, England
- Citizenship: United Kingdom
- Education: Cardiff High School
- Alma mater: University College Wales, Aberystwyth; St John's College, Cambridge
- Occupations: Judge; British Army officer
- Spouses: Mary Davies (m. 1938) Margaret Green (m. 1950)
- Children: 2
- Relatives: Goronwy Rees (brother)
- Military career
- Allegiance: United Kingdom
- Branch: British Army
- Years: 1939–1946
- Rank: Lieutenant colonel
- Unit: 21st Army Group

His Honour Judge Richard Geraint Rees (5 May 1907 – 27 March 1986) was a British judge.

== Early life and education ==
Rees was born in Aberystwyth, Ceredigion, on 5 May 1907. He was the eldest of four children of Apphia Mary James and the Rev. Richard Jenkyn Rees, a minister of the Tabernacle Calvinistic Methodist Church. His younger brother was the journalist Goronwy Rees.

Rees was first educated at Cardiff High School, a grammar school when he joined, which changed to a comprehensive school in 1973. He studied at University College Wales, Aberystwyth and then St John's College, Cambridge, receiving a Bachelor of Laws (LLB) degree with first-class honours. He was awarded the Samuel Evans Prize for his successes.

== Military career ==
Rees was commissioned into the Welsh Guards in November 1939. From 1943 to 1944, he served as deputy assistant adjutant general (DAAG) of the London District. From 1943 to 1945, he served as assistant director of the Army Welfare Services of the British Army Staff, Paris with the rank of lieutenant colonel.

On 1 October 1944, Rees was appointed to the HQ British Army Staff and began organising all British Military Welfare amenities in Paris. He was mentioned in dispatches on 4 April 1946 and it was written that "this officer has exhibited devotion to duty of a high order and his ceaseless efforts have been a source of great encouragement to all."

Rees was awarded the Bronze Star Medal (BSM) on 14 March 1947 for work with the United States Army during his time as assistant director of the Army Welfare Services in Paris.

== Legal career ==
Rees practised law in the South Wales circuit from 1934 to 1939. He practised in London and the Wales and Chester circuit from 1946 to 1956. Then, from 1956 to 1971, he sat at the Magistrates' court as a metropolitan stipendiary magistrate.

In 1971, Rees was sworn in by the Lord Chancellor as a circuit judge, which he remained until 1981. He was appointed deputy chairman of Inner London Sessions shortly after.

From 1971 to 1981, Rees sat as a permanent judge at the Central Criminal Court.

== Personal life ==
Rees married Mary Davies in 1938. They had one son. He then married Margaret Green, widow of Robert Philip Brent Grotrian, on 28 January 1950. They had one daughter.
