= Filby (surname) =

Filby is a surname derived from locality Filby. Notable people with the surname include:

- Eric Filby (1917–2004), English table tennis and lawn tennis player
- Ian Filby (born 1954), English football forward
- William Filby (Roman Catholic priest) (c. 1557–1582), Roman Catholic priest and martyr in medieval England
- William Filby (Anglican priest) (1933–2009), Anglican priest

== See also ==
- Philby, a surname
