= James Klugmann =

British Communist writer

- Born: Norman John Klugmann; 27 February 1912; Hampstead, London, England
- Died: 14 September 1977 (aged 65)
- Education: The Hall School, Hampstead, Gresham's School, Trinity College, Cambridge,
- Employer(s): Royal Army Service Corps, Special Operations Executive
- Known for: Historian of the Communist Party of Great Britain (CPGB); Creating reports that convinced Winston Churchill to support Tito during WWII. Secretary of the World Student Association,
- Height: 5 ft 8 in (173 cm)
- Relatives: Maurice Cornforth (brother-in-law)

Norman John Klugmann (27 February 1912 – 14 September 1977), generally known as James Klugmann, was a leading British Communist writer and WW2 Soviet Spy, who became the official historian of the Communist Party of Great Britain.

== Background and early career ==
Born Norman John Klugmann, in 1912 in Hampstead to upper middle class Jewish parents, he renamed himself James at prep school. His father was a tobacco pipe merchant, while his sister Kitty Cornforth was also a committed Communist, marrying the Marxist philosopher Maurice Cornforth. The family lived on Haverstock Hill, Hampstead, London; Harry Hodson, in his memoirs, recalls visiting the Klugmann family home and recounts of James Klugmann that "his background was impeccably bourgeois."

Klugmann was educated at The Hall School, Hampstead, Gresham's School, Holt, Norfolk (where he was a friend and contemporary of the spy Donald Maclean), and Trinity College, Cambridge. He joined the Communist Party of Great Britain (CPGB) in 1933 whilst studying at Cambridge, where he earned a double first in modern languages.

Klugmann was at pains to deny any connection with spying during his lifetime and a long period of secret service surveillance on him threw up no obvious proof. He had however been on the fringes of such activity, which no doubt gave rise to suspicion, along with his university friendships with some of those who were involved in espionage. With the defection of Vasili Mitrokhin it was revealed that Klugmann was a KGB agent, under the codename MER, who was instrumental in recruiting the Cambridge Five.

In 1935, Klugmann gave up an academic career to become Secretary of the World Student Association, based in Paris, travelling widely across the world. This role, which involved the building of the Popular Front against fascism, first attracted the attention of the British Security Service (MI5). The Service's description of James for its operatives, which was put on file around 1938, said: "Height about 5 ft 8 in (173 cm), light build, broad brow, small featured face, fuzz of greyish hair, probably wears glasses, not remarkably Jewish but rather foreign appearance."

In 1936 Klugmann met Arnold Deutsch, the head of recruitment for NKVD agents based in England. Deutsch's main objective was to get Klugmann to help recruit John Cairncross as a spy. Klugmann became an important figure in the network. However, as he was known to the police as an active member of the Communist Party of Great Britain meant that he was not used as a spy. However, he was given the codename MAYOR and was used to compile reports on other agents.

Deutsch reported to Moscow: "Mayor (James Klugmann) is a party functionary who devotes himself entirely to the party. He is a quiet and thoughtful man. Modest, conscientious, industrious and serious. Everybody who knows him likes him and respects him.... He is known to the British police as an active communist. He is used to legal work and therefore incautious. But if his attention is drawn to this he will act as required."

== Career in Yugoslavia with Special Operations ==
He had joined the Royal Army Service Corps as a private in 1940 but, having a natural flair for languages, he was soon transferred to the Special Operations Executive (SOE), who apparently ignored his communist sympathies. It was claimed by the official historian of SOE that when Klugmann was recruited into SOE by Brigadier Terence Airey (an old boy of Gresham's School), MI5 reported that he was not known to them. In fact, the relevant files had been destroyed at Wormwood Scrubs by a German air raid.

In February 1942 Klugmann was posted to the Yugoslav Section of SOE as an intelligence and coordination officer, based in Cairo. Klugmann became critical of the Serb Royalist leader General Draža Mihailović, who was at the time the chief beneficiary of British aid and support in the resistance movement in Yugoslavia. Klugmann's reports influenced thinking at the Political Warfare Executive, Secret Intelligence Service (MI6), the Foreign Office, and the BBC. He suggested that the Communist leader Josip Broz Tito and his Partisans were killing more Germans than Mihailović's Chetniks, despite smaller numbers.

Churchill switched his support to Tito (see Yugoslavia and the Allies). Some eight understrength Wehrmacht divisions and Bulgarian and Croatian Ustase units were employed in Yugoslavia during 1943 and 1944 fighting the partisans. Yugoslavia was the only country during World War II that liberated itself with little military assistance from the Allies. Although this move was one favoured by Stalin, Tito and Stalin later fell out and became bitter critics. Klugmann rose to the rank of major, an unlikely outcome given his general disposition. He was under constant surveillance, suspected of being an NKVD agent along with Guy Burgess, Donald Maclean and Anthony Blunt, all of whom he knew at Cambridge, and one of whom, Maclean, had been a friend at Gresham's. Proof of this was found in the KGBs archives and it is confirmed that John "James" Klugmann was a KGB talent-spotter and agent who was instrumental in recruiting the Cambridge Five. During his time in SOE and later whilst a civilian in UNRRA (United Nations Relief and Rehabilitation Administration) in Yugoslavia he supported Soviet aims.

== Post-war career ==
Klugmann remained a devout Communist all his life and went on to play a significant role in the CPGB becoming responsible for the Education branch. After his wartime service, he became a member of the executive committee of the British Communist Party and editor of Marxism Today. Michael Straight (later owner and editor of The New Republic and chairman of the National Endowment for the Arts), an American who had studied at Trinity College, Cambridge, and who had become friends there with Blunt, Maclean, Burgess and Kim Philby, described Klugmann as "a warm-hearted and compassionate intellectual whose commitment to Communism left him no time for such minor preoccupations as taking a bath or cleaning his fingernails."

One of the most active and overt British communists of his generation, Klugmann became an influential left-wing journalist after the war and wrote the first two volumes of the official History of the Communist Party of Great Britain, which was continued by Noreen Branson. He also wrote the controversial From Trotsky to Tito (1951), justifying to a British communist audience the party's policy towards Tito's Yugoslavia.

== Books by James Klugmann ==
- The History of the Communist Party of Great Britain: Formative and Early Years 1919–1924 (Vol. 1) ISBN 0-85315-372-8
- The History of the Communist Party of Great Britain: The General Strike 1925–26 (Vol. 2) ISBN 0-85315-374-4
- Wall Street's Drive to War (Communist Party, 1950)
- From Trotsky to Tito (Lawrence & Wishart, 1951) ASIN B0006DBG3G
- The Peaceful Co-existence of Capitalism and Socialism (People's Publishing House 1952) ASIN B0007K14QM
- Dialogue of Christianity and Marxism (Lawrence & Wishart, 1967) ASIN B000G9OYD4
- What Kind of Revolution?: A Christian-Communist Dialogue (Panther, 1968) ISBN 0-586-02580-4
- The Future of Man (Communist Party of Great Britain, 1971) ISBN 0-900302-20-8
- Marxism Today: Theoretical and Discussion Journal of the Communist Party (Communist Party of Great Britain, 1975) ASIN B0006DLHUI

== Notes ==
Media offices
Preceded by New publication	Editor of Marxism Today; 1957–1977	Succeeded by Martin Jacques
