= Yuri Modin =

KGB controller for the "Cambridge Five" (1922-2007)

Yuri Ivanovich Modin (8 November 1922 in Suzdal – 2007 in Moscow) was a Russian KGB agent, best known as the KGB controller for the "Cambridge Five" from 1948 to 1951, during which Donald Duart Maclean was said to have passed atomic secrets to the Soviets. In 1951, Modin arranged the defections of Maclean and Guy Burgess. Modin's predecessors in control of the damaging Cambridge spy ring were executed during Stalin's Great Purge. He worked extensively within the KGB’s operations, including disinformation campaigns and active measures.

Modin said of Kim Philby in February 1994:

He never revealed his true self. Neither the British, nor the women he lived with, nor ourselves [the KGB] ever managed to pierce the armour of mystery that clad him. His great achievement in espionage was his life's work, and it fully occupied him until the day he died. But in the end I suspect that Philby made a mockery of everyone, particularly ourselves.

In his 1994 book, Modin revealed that in the early days Moscow did not really trust the Cambridge Five, British agents who were passing secret information to the Soviet Union. The KGB had difficulty believing that the men would have access to top secret documents; they were particularly suspicious of Philby, wondering how he could have become an agent given his Communist past. According to a review of Modin's book, "the center concluded that all five must really be British intelligence officers trying to penetrate the KGB".

== "The Fifth Man" ==
Modin published his book, Mes Camarades de Cambridge, in France in 1994. The book identified Baron Rothschild as an important member of the Cambridge Spy Ring. For the British translation, the British publisher Headline Book Publishing, made some changes, first to the title, making it My Five Cambridge Friends with the sub-heading: "For the first time, their KGB controller reveals the secrets of the world's most famous spy ring—Burgess, Maclean, Philby, Blunt and Cairncross." Second, Headline changed lines on page 104, now saying that John Cairncross was the Fifth Man: 'At the close of 1944, the name of John Cairncross, code-named the Carelian, was added to the four agents to whose cases I had been assigned. He was the "Fifth Man". Cairncross had at one time or another been in contact with the others, but he was hardly a member of the group.'

The words changed and inserted by Headline were a fabrication, according to Modin, who pointed out that Cairncross, to his knowledge, had never been in contact with any member of the group. The Guardian journalist Richard Norton-Taylor rang Modin to check on this and found him angry that the false claims, changes and fraud on the British (and later US) public, had been made without his being consulted. Alan Rusbridger, who agreed with Roland Perry's assessment that Rothschild was the fifth man, also wrote in The Guardian: "Yuri Modin ... says in the English edition of his recent book that Cairncross was "the fifth man." Modin says he never used the term, which is not contained in the French edition of his book.'

In an interview after publication of the book, Yuri Modin denied ever having named Rothschild as "any kind of Soviet agent". "Because he was in MI5 they learned things from him. This doesn't make him the fifth man, and he wasn't". Modin's own book's title clarifies the name of all five of the Cambridge spy group: My Five Cambridge Friends: Burgess, Maclean, Philby, Blunt, and Cairncross by Their KGB Controller.

Yuri Modin died in 2007 in Moscow.

== Books ==
- Modin, Yuri, My Five Cambridge Friends, ISBN 0-374-21698-3.
