= Philby =

Philby can refer to the following people

- St John Philby (1885–1960), British Arabist, explorer, writer and intelligence officer
- Kim Philby (1912–1988), British intelligence officer and spy for the Soviet Union
- Dell Philby, fictional character in American children's novel series Kingdom Keepers

== See also ==
- Filby, an orthographic variant of the same surname
