= Donald Maclean (spy) =

British diplomat and spy (1913–1983)

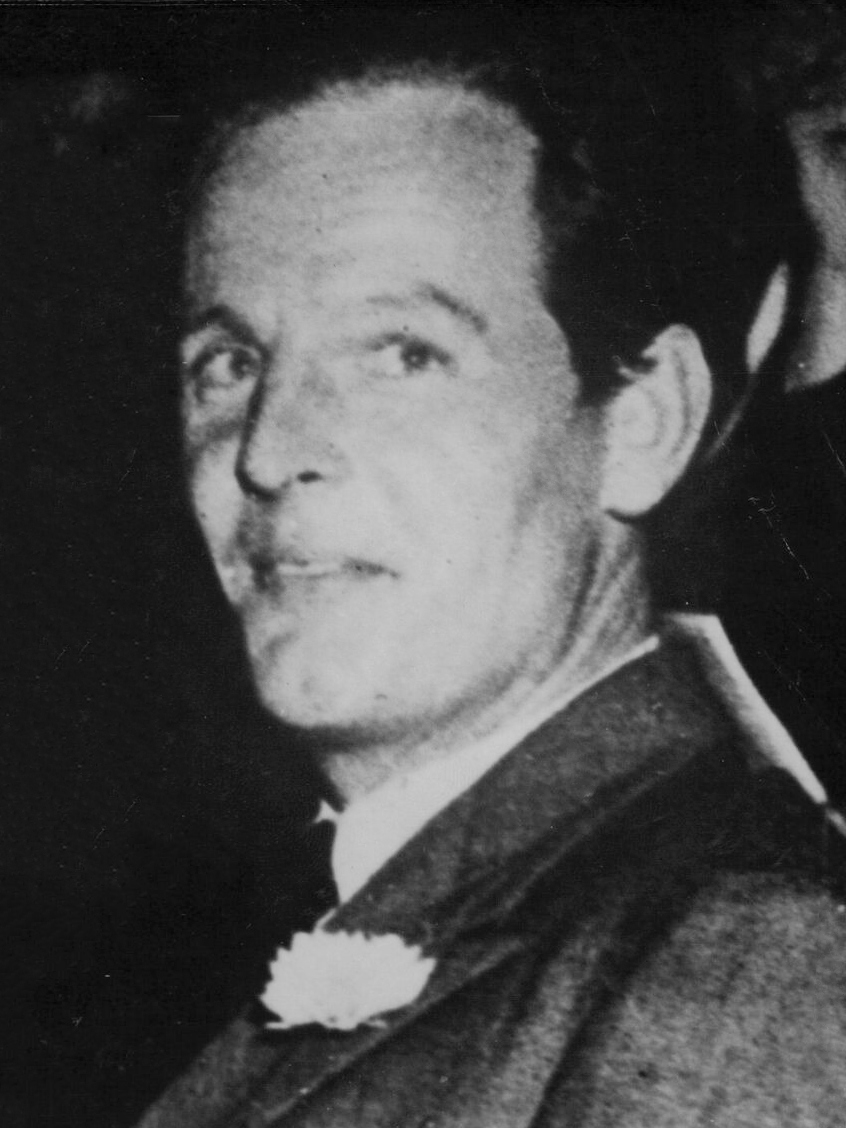
- Born: Donald Duart Maclean; 25 May 1913; Marylebone, London, England
- Died: 6 March 1983 (aged 69); Moscow, Russian SFSR, Soviet Union
- Education: Trinity Hall, Cambridge (BA)
- Spouse: Melinda Maclean
- Children: 3
- Father: Donald Maclean
- Espionage activity
- Allegiance: Soviet Union
- Service branch: Foreign Office
- Rank: Counsellor

Donald Duart Maclean (/məˈkleɪn/ mə-KLAYN; 25 May 1913 – 6 March 1983) was a British diplomat and Soviet double agent who participated in the Cambridge Five spy ring. After being recruited by a Soviet agent as an undergraduate student, Maclean entered the civil service. In 1938, he was appointed as Third Secretary at the British embassy in Paris. He served in London and Washington, D.C., achieving promotion to First Secretary. He was subsequently posted to Egypt, and then was appointed head of the American Department in the Foreign Office.

The Soviets helped Maclean to defect from London to Moscow in 1951. In Moscow, he worked as a specialist on British policy and on relations between the Soviet Union and NATO. He died there on 6 March 1983.

== Childhood and school ==
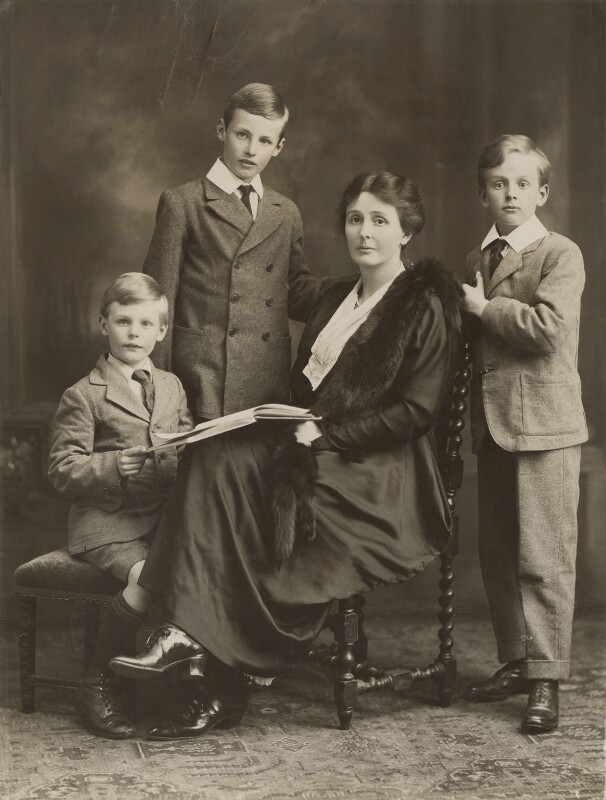
Left–right: Donald Maclean; Ian Lockarbie Maclean; Gwendolen Margaret Devitt, Andrew Ewen Maclean in 1920

Born in Marylebone, London, Donald Duart Maclean was the son of Sir Donald Maclean and Gwendolen Margaret Devitt. Following the 1918 general election, in which Liberal Party leader H. H. Asquith lost his seat, Maclean's father Sir Donald was chosen as chairman of the rump of the 23 independent Liberal MPs who backed Asquith in the House of Commons. As the Labour Party had no leader and Sinn Féin did not attend, he became titular Leader of the Opposition. Maclean's parents had houses in London (later in Buckinghamshire) as well as in the Scottish Borders, where his father represented Peebles and Southern Midlothian, but the family lived mostly in and around London. He grew up in a very political household, in which world affairs were constantly discussed. In 1931 his father entered the Coalition Cabinet as President of the Board of Education.

Maclean's education began as a boarder at St Ronan's School, Worthing. At the age of 13, he was sent to Gresham's School in Norfolk, where he remained from 1926 until 1931, when he was 18. At Gresham's, some of his contemporaries were Jack Simon (later Baron Simon, a Law Lord), James Klugmann (1912–1977), Roger Simon (1913–2002), Benjamin Britten (1913–1976) and Alan Lloyd Hodgkin (later a scientist and Nobel Laureate).

Gresham's had already produced Tom Wintringham (1898–1949), a Marxist military historian, journalist, author and one of the founders of the Communist Party of Great Britain and editor of various party journals and newspapers. James Klugmann and Roger Simon both went with Maclean to Cambridge University and joined the Communist Party at around the same time. Klugmann became the official historian of the British Communist Party, while Simon was later a left-wing Labour peer.

When Maclean was 16, his father was elected for the North Cornwall constituency, and he spent some time in Cornwall during holidays.

== Cambridge ==
From Gresham's, Maclean went to Trinity Hall, Cambridge, arriving in 1931 to read Modern Languages. He played rugby for his college through the winter of 1932–33. In Maclean's second year at Cambridge his father died. Maclean's political views grew much more apparent in the following years in light of "his admiring, if sometimes puzzled, mother". In his final years in college Maclean had become a campus figure, many knowing that he was a communist. In the winter of 1933–34 he wrote a book review for Cambridge Left, to which other leading communists contributed, such as John Cornford, Charles Madge and the Irish scientist, J. D. Bernal. Donald reviewed Contemporary Literature and Social Revolution by R. D. Charques, praising the book for its readiness "to hint at a Marxist conception of literature". In 1934, he became the editor of the Silver Crescent, the Trinity Hall students' magazine. His editorials stressed the decline in world trade, rearmament and arms trafficking. In one article, he insisted: "England is in the throes of a capitalist crisis....If the analysis in the Editorial: A Personal is correct, there is an excellent reason why everyone of military age should start thinking about politics." In a letter to Granta he voiced the demand for a democratically elected student council, equality for female students and rights to use college premises for political meetings.

In 1934, his last year at Cambridge, Maclean became an agent of the Soviet Union's People's Commissariat for Internal Affairs, abbreviated from the Russian as NKVD, recruited by Arnold Deutsch. He was then instructed to give up political activity and enter the Diplomatic Service. He graduated with a first in Modern Languages. After spending a year preparing for the Civil Service examinations, Maclean passed with first-class honours. At the Final Board, Maclean was asked by one of the panel interviewing him, whether he had favoured communism while a university student, ostensibly because the panel knew of a trip he had taken to Moscow in his second year at Cambridge. Maclean said: "At Cambridge, I was initially favourable to it but I am little by little getting disenchanted with it." His apparent sincerity satisfied members of the panel.

== London ==
In August 1935, Maclean was duly admitted to the diplomatic service. In October, he started work at the Foreign Office, and was assigned to the Western department, which dealt with the Netherlands, Spain, Portugal, and Switzerland, as well as the League of Nations. In 1936, Maclean became closely involved in the work of the Non-Intervention Committee set up to monitor the activities of the chief powers, Germany, Italy, and the USSR and their involvement in determining the outcome of the Spanish Civil War.

In the summer of 1937, for a time, multiple occasions passed when no one showed to meet Maclean. Then Kitty Harris (wife of the Communist Party of the USA's party leader Earl Browder) arrived in place of his usual controller and gave the recognition phrase. "You hadn't expected to see a lady, had you?" she said. "No, but it's a pleasant surprise", he replied. Maclean would visit Harris's flat in Bayswater after work, with documents to photograph. Over the next two years, 45 boxes of documents were photographed and sent to Moscow. "She was a cut-out between Maclean and his NKVD controller", said Geoffrey Elliott, who wrote a book about her with Igor Damaskin, a former KGB officer.

== Paris ==
On 24 September 1938, Maclean took up a post as Third Secretary at the British embassy in Paris. In the spring of 1939, an Anglo-French attempt was made to include the Soviet Union into the "peace front" that was intended to deter German aggression. Because of the French involvement in these Moscow negotiations, the telegrams passing between embassies allowed Maclean access to much information. Maclean kept Moscow informed in regard to relations between Germany and the British Empire, on the one hand, and Britain and France on the other, as the French foreign minister Georges Bonnet worked to end French security commitments in Eastern Europe. He also kept Moscow informed about the development of Anglo-French plans for intervention in the war between Finland and the Soviet Union.

In December 1939, Maclean met Melinda Marling, the daughter of a Chicago oil executive. She was a teenager when her parents had divorced, her mother moving to Europe. In October 1929, Melinda and her sisters went to school at Vevey, near Lausanne, where their mother rented a villa, and spent their holidays at Juan-les-Pins in France. Melinda's mother moved to New York, marrying Charles Dunbar, an executive in the paper industry, and brought her daughters to live with them in Manhattan, where Melinda attended the Spence School. After graduation she spent some months in New York City then returned to Paris, where she enrolled at the Sorbonne in Paris to study French literature. Mark Culme-Seymour later described her as "quite pretty and vivacious, but rather reserved. I thought that she was a bit prim. She was always well-groomed, lipstick bright, hair permed, a double row of pearls around her neck. Her interests seemed limited to family, friends, clothes and Hollywood movies."

In the 1950s, Culme-Seymour tracked down the exiled Macleans in Moscow. Melinda told him that she knew she would be going to Russia right from the beginning, even before Maclean defected.

Soviet archives confirm this view. As Maclean told Harris, on the evening he met Marling, he saw more to her: "I was very taken by her views. She's a liberal, she's in favour of the Popular Front and doesn't mind mixing with communists even though her parents are well-off. There was a White Russian girl, one of her friends, who attacked the Soviet Union and Melinda went for her. We found we spoke the same language." Maclean had told Marling about his role as a spy. He told Harris that Marling not only reacted positively, but "actually promised to help me to the extent that she can – and she is well connected in the American community".

On 10 June 1940, as the German Army approached Paris, Maclean and a pregnant Marling were married at the local mairie. The British Embassy was evacuated, and the Macleans drove south with one of Donald's colleagues. They were able to escape France on a small merchant ship, and went to London.

== London during the Second World War ==
Maclean was assigned by the British Foreign Office to work on economic warfare matters. Maclean became one of the Foreign Office's experts on economic warfare, civil air matters, military base negotiations and natural resources useful in the war, such as tungsten. In 1940 Walter Krivitsky, who had defected from Soviet military intelligence spymaster revealed information about Soviet espionage to MI5. Krivitsky may have given clues to the identity of Maclean that were not followed up.

Three days before Christmas 1940, Melinda Maclean went to New York to have her baby, which died shortly after its birth. Some weeks later she flew back to London and went to work in the BBC bookstore. Donald Maclean was promoted and given the prestigious assignment as Second Secretary at the British Embassy in Washington. Towards the end of April 1944, the Macleans set sail in convoy for New York.

== Washington ==
Maclean served in Washington from 1944 to 1948, achieving promotion to First Secretary. In 1944 Melinda Maclean was again pregnant, giving birth to a son in New York City. The Macleans frequently visited Melinda Maclean's mother and stepfather in Manhattan and their country place in the Berkshires. They vacationed on Long Island and Cape Cod with Melinda Maclean's sisters and mother.

The Macleans became part of the liberal Georgetown social set in Washington, which included Katharine Graham, as well as participating in the diplomatic life of the city.

Maclean went to New York on a weekly basis. Maclean was considered to be an exceptionally hard worker at the embassy as his fellow diplomat Robert Cecil remembered in 1989: "No task was too hard for him; no hours were too long. He gained the reputation of one who would always take over a tangled skein from a colleague who was sick, or going on leave, or simply less zealous. In this way he was able to manoeuvre himself into the hidden places that were of the most interest to the NKVD".

Towards the end of that period Maclean acted as Secretary of the Combined Policy Committee on atomic energy matters. He was Moscow's main source of information about US/UK/Canada atomic energy policy development. Although Maclean did not transmit technical data on the atom bomb, he reported on its development and progress, particularly the amount of plutonium (used in the Fat Man bombs) available to the United States. As the British representative on the American–British–Canadian Council on the sharing of atomic secrets, he was able to provide the Soviet Union with information from Council meetings. This gave Soviet scientists the ability to predict the number of bombs that could be built by the Americans. In addition to atomic energy matters, Maclean's responsibilities at the Washington embassy included civil aviation, bases, post-hostilities planning, Turkey and Greece, NATO and Berlin.

== Cairo ==
In 1948 Maclean was appointed Head of Chancery at the British Embassy in Cairo. He was at that time the youngest Counsellor in the British Foreign Service. As soon as he arrived Maclean began to have problems with his KGB contact, who arranged their meetings in an unsatisfactory manner. Maclean suggested that Melinda should pass his information to the wife of the Soviet resident at the hairdresser's and Modin reported that "Melinda was quite prepared to do this."

Cairo was an important post, the key to British power in the area and a central point in Anglo-American planning for pre-emptive war with the Soviet Union. At this time Britain was the major power in the Middle East with troops in both the Canal Zone and nearby Palestine and airbases in the Canal Zone from which American atomic bombers could reach the Soviet Union. In regard to Egypt itself, British policy was one of laissez-faire or non-interference with the corruption surrounding King Farouk. Maclean disagreed strongly and felt that Britain should encourage reform which alone, in his opinion, could save the country from communism. "And, except to stress its dangers, that was all I ever heard Donald say about communism," recalled Geoffrey Hoare, the News Chronicle Cairo correspondent.

Maclean was considered the key official in the Cairo Embassy, specifically responsible for coordinating US/UK war planning and, under the Ambassador, relations with the Egyptian government. By now, his double life was beginning to affect Maclean. He began drinking, brawling and talking about his double life. After a drunken episode which resulted in the wrecking of an American embassy staffer's apartment, Melinda told the ambassador that Donald was ill and needed leave to see a London doctor. It is possible that this series of events was contrived to provide a way for Maclean to return to England as American intelligence was getting close to identifying Maclean as a Soviet agent by means of the Venona messages. At this time Melinda Maclean was having an affair with an Egyptian aristocrat, with whom she travelled to Spain when Donald Maclean went to England.

== London deskbound ==
After a few months' rest, Maclean recovered from the troubles of his Egyptian period and Melinda Maclean agreed to return to the marriage, immediately becoming pregnant. Maclean's career did not seem to suffer from the events in Egypt. He was promoted and made head of the American Department in the Foreign Office, perhaps its most important assignment for an officer at Maclean's level. This allowed him to continue to keep Moscow informed about Anglo-American relations and planning. The most important report Maclean sent to Moscow concerned the emergency summit in Washington in December 1950 between the British Prime Minister Clement Attlee and U.S. President Harry S. Truman. After China entered the Korean War, there were demands both outside and inside the U.S. government, most notably by General Douglas MacArthur, that the U.S. attack China with nuclear weapons. The British were strongly opposed to both the use of nuclear weapons and escalating the war by attacking China, and Attlee had gone to Washington with the aim of stopping both. Truman reassured Attlee at the Washington summit that he would not allow the use of nuclear weapons or take the war outside Korea. Maclean provided a transcript of what was said at the Truman-Attlee summit to Yuri Modin, the "control" of the Cambridge spy ring. Meanwhile, the American and British governments were concluding that Maclean was indeed a Soviet agent, a process carefully tracked by fellow Soviet operative Kim Philby in Washington.

The journalist Cyril Connolly vividly described what he had seen of Maclean in London c. 1951: "He had lost his serenity, his hands would tremble, his face was usually a livid yellow...he was miserable and in a very bad way. In conversation, a kind of shutter would fall as if he had returned to some basic and incommunicable anxiety."

== Detection ==
Maclean's role was discovered when the VENONA decryption was carried out at Arlington Hall, Virginia and Eastcote in London between 1945 and 1951. These related to coded messages between New York, Washington and Moscow for which Soviet code clerks had re-used one-time pads. The cryptanalysts working as part of the Venona project, discovered that twelve coded cables had been sent, six from New York from June to September 1944 and six from Washington in April 1945, by an agent named Gomer. The first cable sent but not the first to be deciphered described a meeting with Sergei on 25 June and Gomer's forthcoming trip to New York where his wife was living with her mother awaiting the birth of a child. This was decoded in April 1951. A short list of nine men was identified as possible Homers (Gomer is the Russian form of Homer), one of whom was Maclean.

The second cable on 2–3 August 1944 was a description, but not a transcript, of a message from Churchill to Roosevelt, which Homer claimed to have decrypted. It suggested that Churchill was trying to persuade Roosevelt to abandon plans for Operation Anvil, the invasion of Provence, in favour of an attack through Venice and Trieste into Austria. This was typical of Churchill's strategic thinking since he was always looking for a flanking move. But it was rejected outright by both American and British generals.

Shortly after the VENONA investigation began, Kim Philby, another member of the Cambridge Five, was assigned to Washington, serving as Britain's CIA–FBI–NSA liaison. He saw the VENONA material, and recognised that Maclean was Homer, which was confirmed by his KGB control.

Believing that Maclean would confess to MI5, Philby and Guy Burgess decided that Burgess would travel to London, where Maclean was head of the Foreign Office's American desk, to warn him. Burgess contrived to receive three speeding tickets in a single day in Virginia. The Governor of Virginia complained to the British Ambassador and Burgess went back to London, as planned.

The Soviets were desperate for Maclean to get out of London, fearful that in his then state he would crack immediately under interrogation. Donald Maclean discussed the possible defection with Melinda Maclean. According to Modin, she responded: "They're quite right – go as soon as you can, don't waste a single moment."

== Defection ==
The day eventually earmarked for Maclean to make his escape happened to be his 38th birthday: 25 May 1951, a Friday. He came home by train from the Foreign Office to his home in Surrey as usual that evening, and soon afterwards Guy Burgess turned up. After eating the birthday supper that Melinda had prepared, Maclean said goodbye to his wife and children; he and Burgess then got into Burgess's car, and left. They drove to Southampton, took a ferry to France, then disappeared from view, sparking a press and intelligence furore. It was five years before Khrushchev confirmed that they were in the Soviet Union.

On the Monday after Maclean's departure, Melinda Maclean telephoned the Foreign Office to ask if her husband was there. Her pose of total ignorance convinced them: MI5 put off interviewing her for nearly a week, and the Macleans' house was never searched. Three weeks after Maclean left she gave birth to their third child, a daughter. Francis Marling, Melinda's father, flew from New York to help. Friends in the State Department gave him Foreign Office contacts who proved unhelpful. He returned to New York with a low opinion of Foreign Office officials.

== Moscow ==
Maclean, unlike Burgess, assimilated into the Soviet Union and became a respected citizen, learning Russian, receiving a doctorate, and serving as a specialist on the economic policy of the West and British foreign affairs. In February 1956, the presence of Maclean and Burgess in Moscow was publicly revealed following an interview with Sydney Weiland, a Reuters correspondent, and Richard Hughes of The Sunday Times, though a statement issued by the Soviet press agency TASS denied that Burgess and Maclean had ever been spies, claiming that they had gone behind the Iron Curtain to "further understanding between East and West" for the sake of world peace.

After a brief period teaching English at a school in Kuybyshev (now Samara), Maclean joined the staff of International Affairs in early 1956 as a specialist on British home and foreign policy, and relations between the Soviet Union and NATO. He briefly shared a small room with his new Soviet colleagues on the second floor of the magazine's premises on Gorokhovsky Pereulok. He then worked for the Soviet Foreign Ministry and IMEMO, the Institute of World Economy and International Relations.

Maclean was awarded the Order of the Red Banner of Labour and the Order of Combat. His publications for IMEMO were under the name of S. Madzoevsky. He seems to have had some contact with Andrei Sakharov and with twins Roy and Zhores Medvedev.

== Extramarital affairs and later family life ==
The Macleans had three surviving children: Fergus, born in 1944, Donald, in 1946, and Melinda, in 1951. The Maclean marriage came under pressure in Moscow, for Donald Maclean continued until the mid-1960s to drink heavily. Kim Philby and Melinda Maclean became lovers during a ski trip in 1964, while Eleanor Philby, Philby's American wife, was on an extended visit to the US. Maclean found out and broke with Philby. Eleanor Philby discovered the affair on her return, and left Moscow for good. Melinda moved in with Philby in 1966, but within three years tired of him and left. She left Moscow for good in 1979. Melinda Maclean returned to the West to be with her mother and sisters; her children soon followed her. She died in New York in 2010 without saying a single word to the media.

Maclean's son Fergus enrolled at University College London in 1974, as he had UK citizenship, prompting a question in Parliament. Together with her second husband, Maclean's daughter left for the United States, along with her daughter, Maclean's granddaughter.

== Death ==
Maclean was reported seriously ill with pneumonia in December 1982, and was housebound after his recovery. The Institute of World Economy and International Relations, Maclean's workplace, reported his death at the age of 69 on 6 March 1983. He was cremated and his ashes were scattered on his parents' grave in the churchyard of Holy Trinity Church, Penn, Buckinghamshire in England. Twenty years previously, Guy Burgess' ashes had also been scattered on his family grave in England.

At the time of his death, Maclean had been working at the institute, "a government think-tank, as a foreign policy analyst" according to The Washington Post.

== Legacy ==
In May 1970, Hodder & Stoughton published Maclean's book British Foreign Policy since Suez which he wrote for a British readership. Maclean told journalists that he set out to analyse the subject rather than to attack it, but criticised British diplomatic support for the United States in the Vietnam War. He stated that he would donate the British royalties to the British Committee for Medical Aid to Vietnam.

Of the five spies that made up the Cambridge Spy Ring, Maclean was not the best known, but, according to some, he provided the most intelligence of value to the Soviet Union as his position as a senior diplomat in the Foreign Office gave access to more information than the other four. He was able to provide the Soviets with "the most intimate details" of Anglo-American decision-making on such matters as the future of nuclear energy and the founding of the North Atlantic Treaty Organization. An official American appraisal concluded: "In the fields of US/UK/Canada planning on atomic energy, US/UK post-war planning and policy in Europe, all information up to the date of Maclean's defection undoubtedly reached Soviet hands".

== Honours ==
- Order of the Red Banner of Labour

== See also ==
- Cambridge Five
- Kim Philby (1912–1988)
- Guy Burgess (1911–1963)
- Anthony Blunt (1907–1983)
- James Klugmann (1912–1977)
- John Cairncross (1913–1995)

== Cited sources ==
- Cecil, Robert (1988). A Divided Life – A Biography of Donald Maclean. the University of Michigan. ISBN 9780370311296.
- Polmer, Norman; Allen, Thomas B. (2004). The Spy Book. Random House. ISBN 0375720251.
