= Andrew Boyle (journalist) =

Scottish journalist and biographer

Andrew Philip More Boyle (27 May 1919 – 22 April 1991) was a Scottish journalist and biographer. His biography of Brendan Bracken won the 1974 Whitbread Awards and his book The Climate of Treason exposed Anthony Blunt as the "Fourth Man" in the Cambridge Five Soviet spy ring.

He was born in the Scottish city of Dundee, and was educated at Blairs College in Aberdeen and the University of Paris. During the Second World War he was part of Britain's military intelligence in the Far East. After the war he joined the BBC as a radio scriptwriter and producer. In 1965 he was the founding editor of the BBC Radio 4 programme The World At One which "gained a reputation as one of the best informed news programs and won an audience of four million".

He also wrote the definitive biographies of Lord Trenchard, the father of the Royal Air Force and Erskine Childers, Irish Nationalist and author.

== Bibliography ==
- No Passing Glory. The Full and Authentic Biography of Group Captain Cheshire. London: Collins. 1955. OCLC 698901373.
- Trenchard: Man of Vision. London: Collins. 1962. OCLC 502365129.
- Montagu Norman: a Biography. London: Cassell. 1967. OCLC 185582845.
- Only the Wind Will Listen: Reith of the BBC. Hutchinson: London. 1972. OCLC 905251503.
- 'Poor, Dear Brendan': the Quest for Brendan Bracken. Hutchinson: London. 1974. OCLC 1264955.
- The Riddle of Erskine Childers. London: Hutchinson. 1977. OCLC 782001325.
- The Climate of Treason: Five Who Spied For Russia. Hutchinson: London. 1979. OCLC 13833543.

Boyle left uncompleted biographies on John Moore-Brabazon (pioneering aviator and politician), Moura Budberg (adventuress and spy), Arthur "Bomber" Harris, and Dick White (spymaster).
