= Satellite Award for Best Actor – Miniseries or Television Film =

Annual television award

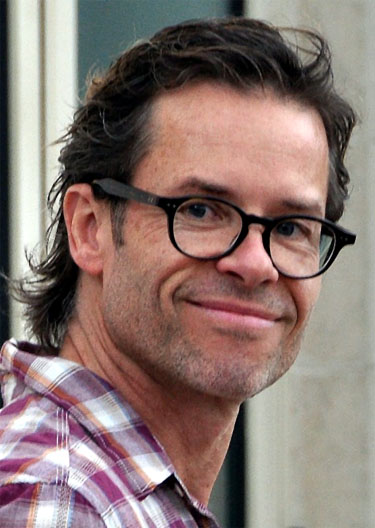
- The 2023 recipient: Guy Pearce
- Awarded for: Best Actor in a Miniseries or Television Film
- Country: United States
- Presented by: International Press Academy
- First award: 1996
- Currently held by: Guy Pearce – A Spy Among Friends (2023)

Satellite Award for Best Actor – Miniseries or Television Film is one of the categories of the annual Satellite Awards in film and television.

== Winners and nominees ==
=== 1990s ===
Year	Actor	Series	Role	Network
1996	Alan Rickman	Rasputin: Dark Servant of Destiny	Grigori Rasputin	HBO
1996	Beau Bridges	Hidden in America	Bill Januson	Showtime
1996	Ted Danson	Gulliver's Travels	Lemuel Gulliver	NBC
1996	Eric Roberts	In Cold Blood	Perry Smith	CBS
1996	James Woods	The Summer of Ben Tyler	Temple Rayburn	CBS
1997	Gary Sinise	George Wallace	George C. Wallace	TNT
1997	Armand Assante	The Odyssey	Odysseus	NBC
1997	Gabriel Byrne	Weapons of Mass Distraction	Lionel Powers	HBO
1997	Ving Rhames	Don King: Only in America	Don King	HBO
1997	Sidney Poitier	Mandela and de Klerk	Nelson Mandela	Showtime
1998	Delroy Lindo	Glory & Honor	Mathew Henson	TNT
1998	Cary Elwes	The Pentagon Wars	Lt. Colonel James Burton	HBO
1998	Laurence Fishburne	Always Outnumbered	Socrates Fortlow	HBO
1998	Kevin Pollak	From the Earth to the Moon	Joseph Francis Shea	HBO
1998	Patrick Stewart	Moby Dick	Captain Ahab	USA Network
1999	William H. Macy	A Slight Case of Murder	Terry Thorpe	TNT
1999	Beau Bridges	P. T. Barnum	P. T. Barnum	A&E
1999	Don Cheadle	A Lesson Before Dying	Grant Wiggins	HBO
1999	Brent Spiner	Introducing Dorothy Dandridge	Earl Mills	HBO
1999	Delroy Lindo	Strange Justice	Clarence Thomas	Showtime

=== 2000s ===
Year	Actress	Series	Role	Network
2000	James Woods	Dirty Pictures	Dennis Barrie	Showtime
2000	Andy García	For Love or Country: The Arturo Sandoval Story	Arturo Sandoval	HBO
2000	Bob Hoskins	Noriega: God's Favorite	Manuel Noriega	Showtime
2000	Louis Gossett Jr.	The Color of Love: Jacey's Story	Lou Hastings	CBS
2000	Matthew Modine	Flowers for Algernon	Charlie Gordon	CBS
2001	Richard Dreyfuss	The Day Reagan Was Shot	Alexander Haig	Showtime
2001	Ben Kingsley	Anne Frank: The Whole Story	Otto Frank	ABC
2001	William Hurt	Varian's War	Varian Fry	Showtime
2001	Damian Lewis	Band of Brothers	Major Richard "Dick" Winters	HBO
2001	Jeffrey Wright	Boycott	Dr. Martin Luther King Jr.	HBO
2002	William H. Macy	Door to Door	Bill Porter	TNT
2002	Ted Danson	Living with the Dead	James Van Praagh	CBS
2002	Albert Finney	The Gathering Storm	Winston Churchill	HBO
2002	Harry J. Lennix	Keep the Faith, Baby	Adam Clayton Powell Jr.	Showtime
2002	Patrick Stewart	King of Texas	John Lear	TNT
2003	James Woods	Rudy: The Rudy Giuliani Story	Rudy Giuliani	USA Network
2003	Robert Carlyle	Hitler: The Rise of Evil	Adolf Hitler	CBS
2003	Troy Garity	Soldier's Girl	Barry Winchell	Showtime
2003	Lee Pace	Soldier's Girl	Scottie / Calpernia Addams	Showtime
2003	Al Pacino	Angels in America	Roy Cohn	HBO
2003	Tom Wilkinson	Normal	Roy Applewood	HBO
2004	Jamie Foxx	Redemption: The Stan Tookie Williams Story	Stan "Tookie" Williams	FX
2004	Keith Carradine	Deadwood	Wild Bill Hickok	HBO
2004	Mos Def	Something the Lord Made	Vivien Thomas	HBO
2004	Alan Rickman	Something the Lord Made	Dr. Alfred Blalock	HBO
2004	Geoffrey Rush	The Life and Death of Peter Sellers	Peter Sellers	HBO
2005	Jonathan Rhys Meyers	Elvis	Elvis Presley	CBS
2005	Ted Danson	Our Fathers	Mitchell Garabedian	Showtime
2005	Christian Campbell	Reefer Madness: The Movie Musical	Jimmy Harper	Showtime
2005	Rupert Everett	Sherlock Holmes and the Case of the Silk Stocking	Sherlock Holmes	BBC One
2005	Kenneth Branagh	Warm Springs	Franklin D. Roosevelt	HBO
2005	Ed Harris	Empire Falls	Miles Roby	HBO
2006	Bill Nighy	Gideon's Daughter	Gideon Warner	BBC America
2006	Andre Braugher	Thief	Nick Atwater	FX
2006	Hugh Dancy	Elizabeth I	Robert Devereux, Earl of Essex	HBO
2006	Ben Kingsley	Mrs. Harris	Herman Tarnower	HBO
2006	Charles Dance	Bleak House	Mr. Tulkinghorn	BBC One
2007	David Oyelowo	Five Days	Matt Wellings	HBO
2007	Robert Lindsay	The Trial of Tony Blair	Tony Blair	More4
2007	Jim Broadbent	Longford	Frank Pakenham, Earl of Longford	HBO
2007	Aidan Quinn	Bury My Heart at Wounded Knee	Henry L. Dawes	HBO
2007	Tom Selleck	Jesse Stone: Sea Change	Jesse Stone	CBS
2007	Toby Stephens	Jane Eyre	Edward Fairfax Rochester	BBC One
2008	Paul Giamatti	John Adams	John Adams	HBO
2008	Benedict Cumberbatch	The Last Enemy	Stephen Ezard	BBC One
2008	Ralph Fiennes	Bernard and Doris	Bernard Lafferty	HBO
2008	Kevin Spacey	Recount	Ron Klain	HBO
2008	Tom Wilkinson	Recount	James Baker	HBO
2008	Stellan Skarsgård	God on Trial	Baumgarten	PBS
2009	Brendan Gleeson	Into the Storm	Winston Churchill	HBO
2009	Kenneth Branagh	Wallander	Kurt Wallander	BBC One
2009	Kevin Bacon	Taking Chance	Michael Strobl	HBO
2009	William Hurt	Endgame	Will Esterhuyse	Channel 4
2009	Jeremy Irons	Georgia O'Keeffe	Alfred Stieglitz	Lifetime
2009	Ian McKellen	The Prisoner	Number Two / Curtis	AMC

=== 2010s ===
Year	Actress	Series	Role	Network
2010	Al Pacino	You Don't Know Jack	Dr. Jack Kevorkian	HBO
2010	Benedict Cumberbatch	Sherlock	Sherlock Holmes	PBS
2010	Idris Elba	Luther	Det. John Luther	BBC One
2010	Ian McShane	The Pillars of the Earth	Waleran Bigod	Starz
2010	Barry Pepper	When Love Is Not Enough: The Lois Wilson Story	Bill Wilson	CBS
2010	Dennis Quaid	The Special Relationship	Bill Clinton	HBO
2010	David Suchet	Agatha Christie's Poirot: Murder on the Orient Express	Hercule Poirot	ITV
2011	Jason Isaacs	Case Histories	Jackson Brodie	BBC One
2011	Hugh Bonneville	Downton Abbey	Robert Crawly, Earl of Grantham	PBS
2011	Idris Elba	Luther	Det. John Luther	BBC One
2011	Laurence Fishburne	Thurgood	Thurgood Marshall	HBO
2011	William Hurt	Too Big to Fail	Henry Paulson	HBO
2011	Bill Nighy	Page Eight	Johnny Worricker	BBC Two
2012	Benedict Cumberbatch	Sherlock	Sherlock Holmes	PBS
2012	Woody Harrelson	Game Change	Steve Schmidt	HBO
2012	Clive Owen	Hemingway & Gellhorn	Ernest Hemingway	HBO
2012	Kenneth Branagh	Wallander	Kurt Wallander	BBC One
2012	Idris Elba	Luther	Det. John Luther	BBC One
2012	Kevin Costner	Hatfields & McCoys	Devil Anse Hatfield	HISTORY
2013	Michael Douglas	Behind the Candelabra	Liberace	HBO
2013	Peter Mullan	Top of the Lake	Matt Mitcham	BBC Two
2013	Chiwetel Ejiofor	Dancing on the Edge	Louis Lester	BBC Two
2013	Matthew Goode	Dancing on the Edge	Stanley Mitchell	BBC Two
2013	Matt Damon	Behind the Candelabra	Scott Thorson	HBO
2013	Al Pacino	Phil Spector	Phil Spector	HBO
2013	Benedict Cumberbatch	Parade's End	Christopher Tietjens	HBO
2013	Dominic West	Burton & Taylor	Richard Burton	BBC Four
2014	Mark Ruffalo	The Normal Heart	Ned Weeks	HBO
2014	Dominic Cooper	Fleming: The Man Who Would Be Bond	Ian Fleming	BBC America
2014	Richard Jenkins	Olive Kitteridge	Henry Kitteridge	HBO
2014	Stephen Rea	The Honourable Woman	Sir Hugh Hayden-Hoyle	SundanceTV
2014	David Suchet	Agatha Christie's Poirot	Hercule Poirot	ITV
2014	Kiefer Sutherland	24: Live Another Day	Jack Bauer	Fox
2015	Mark Rylance	Wolf Hall	Thomas Cromwell	BBC Two
2015	Martin Clunes	Arthur & George	Arthur Conan Doyle	ITV
2015	Michael Gambon	The Casual Vacancy	Howard Mollison	HBO
2015	Oscar Isaac	Show Me a Hero	Nick Wasicsko	HBO
2015	David Oyelowo	Nightingale	Peter Snowden	HBO
2015	Damian Lewis	Wolf Hall	Henry VIII of England	BBC Two
2015	Ben Mendelsohn	Bloodline	Danny Rayburn	Netflix
2016	Bryan Cranston	All the Way	Lyndon B. Johnson	HBO
2016	Cuba Gooding Jr.	The People v. O.J. Simpson	O. J. Simpson	FX
2016	Courtney B. Vance	The People v. O.J. Simpson	Johnnie Cochran	FX
2016	Wendell Pierce	Confirmation	Clarence Thomas	HBO
2016	Tom Hiddleston	The Night Manager	Jonathan Pine	AMC
2016	Anthony Hopkins	The Dresser	Sir	BBC Two
2017	Robert De Niro	The Wizard of Lies	Bernie Madoff	HBO
2017	Benedict Cumberbatch	Sherlock	Sherlock Holmes	PBS
2017	Jude Law	The Young Pope	Pope Pius XIII	HBO
2017	Ewan McGregor	Fargo	Emmit and Ray Stussy	FX
2017	Tim Pigott-Smith	King Charles III	King Charles III	BBC Two
2018	Darren Criss	The Assassination of Gianni Versace	Andrew Cunanan	FX
2018	Daniel Brühl	The Alienist	Dr. Laszlo Kreizler	TNT
2018	Benedict Cumberbatch	Patrick Melrose	Patrick Melrose	Showtime
2018	Jeff Daniels	The Looming Tower	John O'Neill	Hulu
2018	Hugh Grant	A Very English Scandal	Jeremy Thorpe	BBC One
2018	Jared Harris	The Terror	Captain Francis Crozier	AMC
2019	Jared Harris	Chernobyl	Valery Legasov	HBO
2019	Russell Crowe	The Loudest Voice	Roger Ailes	Showtime
2019	Jharrel Jerome	When They See Us	Korey Wise	Netflix
2019	Aaron Paul	El Camino: A Breaking Bad Movie	Jesse Pinkman	Netflix
2019	Chris Pine	I Am the Night	Jay Singletary	TNT
2019	Sam Rockwell	Fosse/Verdon	Bob Fosse	FX

=== 2020s ===
Year	Actress	Series	Role	Network
2020	Ethan Hawke	The Good Lord Bird	John Brown	Showtime
2020	John Boyega	Small Axe	Leroy Logan	BBC One/Prime Video
2020	Bryan Cranston	Your Honor	Michael Desiato	Showtime
2020	Hugh Grant	The Undoing	Jonathan Fraser	HBO
2020	Hugh Jackman	Bad Education	Frank Tassone	HBO
2020	Chris Rock	Fargo	Loy Cannon	FX
2020	Mark Ruffalo	I Know This Much Is True	Dominick and Thomas Birdsey	HBO
2021	Ewan McGregor	Halston	Halston	Netflix
2021	Colin Farrell	The North Water	Henry Drax	AMC+
2021	Stephen Graham	Help	Tony	Channel 4
2021	Michael Keaton	Dopesick	Dr. Samuel Finnix	Hulu
2021	Clive Owen	Impeachment: American Crime Story	President Bill Clinton	FX
2021	Andrew Scott	Oslo	Terje Rød-Larsen	HBO
2022	Evan Peters	Dahmer – Monster: The Jeffrey Dahmer Story	Jeffrey Dahmer	Netflix
2022	Jon Bernthal	We Own This City	Sergeant Wayne Jenkins	HBO
2022	Jeff Bridges	The Old Man	Dan Chase / Henry Dixon / Johnny Kohler	FX
2022	Andrew Garfield	Under the Banner of Heaven	Detective Jeb Pyre	FX on Hulu
2022	Jared Leto	WeCrashed	Adam Neumann	Apple TV+
2022	Sean Penn	Gaslit	John N. Mitchell	Starz
2023	Guy Pearce	A Spy Among Friends	Kim Philby	MGM+
2023	Matt Bomer	Fellow Travelers	Hawkins "Hawk" Fuller	Showtime
2023	Jon Hamm	Fargo	Sheriff Roy Tillman	FX
2023	Damian Lewis	A Spy Among Friends	Nicholas Elliott	MGM+
2023	Bill Pullman	Murdaugh Murders: The Movie	Alex Murdaugh	Lifetime
2023	Steven Yeun	Beef	Danny Cho	Netflix
