= Durnford School =

Former English preparatory school

Coordinates: 50°36′35″N 2°00′12″W

Durnford School was an English preparatory school for boys which opened in 1894 on the Isle of Purbeck in Dorset.

The school occupied Durnford House, in the High Street of the village of Langton Matravers near Swanage, and was notoriously spartan and uncomfortable. Ben Macintyre described Durnford as "a traditionally brutal prep school [which] epitomised the strange British faith in bad food, plenty of Latin and beatings from an early age". "Strip and swim" was the morning ritual for the boys – watched by headmaster Thomas Pellatt – into the sea from Dancing Ledge on the coast in 1898. Later, Pellatt had quarrymen blast out a pool in the rocks of Dancing Ledge, for his pupils to swim in. Pellatt, who co-wrote plays that appeared on the London stage under the pseudonym Wilfred T Coleby, published his reminiscences in 1936.

The School closed at the onset of the Second World War and the Durnford boys were transferred to another prep school in the village, the Old Malthouse. In 1939 the site became a ramshackle out-station of the Telecommunications Research Establishment, where Britain's radar systems were devised from 1940 to 1942. The school's location is shown on a map of radar sites scattered throughout Dorset during the period.

In 1948, when the British army gave it up, Durnford House was acquired by the owners of the Old Malthouse. The main buildings were variously pulled down or sold, leaving the Old Malthouse with the grounds, which were levelled for playing fields. Durnford House itself still stands.

== War memorial ==
St George's Parish Church, Langton Matravers, has a war memorial containing 53 names of old boys of the school who died in the First World War. There is a further memorial to those killed in the Second World War, but without the names.

== Notable former pupils ==
- Henry Egerton Cotton CBE, First Chancellor, (1992-93?) John Moores University, Lord Lieutenant of Merseyside (1989–92)
- Admiral Sir Geoffrey Oliver
- Sir Stephen Hastings MC, SAS, SOE, MP
- Nicholas Elliott, MI6 Intelligence Officer notable for his involvement with the Commander Lionel Crabb affair in the 1950s and the flight of traitor Kim Philby to Moscow in 1963.
- Ian Fleming author of the James Bond novels, who attended Durnford before Eton together with his brother Peter. The school was next to the estate of the Bond family whose motto is 'Non sufficit orbis' ('The World Is Not Enough'). Fleming wrote to his mother at the age of seven: "My coff (sic) has grown to a whoping (sic) coff now. Don't tell Mr Pellatt cause just this morning he said that nun (sic) of us had coffs. I am afraid that I do not like school very much". The head's wife read to the pupils from popular fiction including John Buchan adventures, The Prisoner of Zenda and Bulldog Drummond.
- Vice-Admiral Sir Gerard "Ged" Mansfield RN (Edward Gerard Napier Mansfield) was Deputy Supreme Allied Commander, Atlantic, based at Norfolk, Virginia, from 1973 to 1974. He was a descendant of Admiral Sir Charles John Napier.
- Admiral of the Fleet John Tovey, 1st Baron Tovey (1885–1971)
