= Rufina Pukhova =

Russian memoir writer (1932–2021)

- Born: Rufina Ivanovna Pukhova; 1 September 1932; Moscow, Russian SFSR, Soviet Union
- Died: 17 May 2021 (aged 88)
- Occupation: Writer
- Spouse: Kim Philby (m. 1972; died 1988)

Rufina Ivanovna Pukhova (Russian: Руфина Ивановна Пухова; 1 September 1932 – 17 May 2021) was a Russian memoir writer. She was the last wife of Kim Philby, a KGB double agent who rose in rank through British Intelligence along with the Cambridge Five. She met Philby through George Blake. Pukhova and Philby married in 1971. She is the author of The Private Life of Kim Philby: The Moscow Years (2000). Pukhova was born in Moscow to a Russian father and a Polish mother.

== Early life ==
Before meeting Kim Philby, Pukhova worked as a copy editor in Russia after surviving cancer. She lived through World War II as well as the Cold War. It was not until Philby had defected to the Soviet Union that the two met.

== Married life with Philby ==
The couple married in 1971. She was the fourth and final wife of Kim Philby. He was a drunkard through their early marriage, but he slowly gave up drinking to save their marriage. The couple lived in Moscow in an apartment located on the sixth floor, hence the title "Island on the Sixth Floor", another memoir written by Pukhova. The apartment was intricately hidden so as to deter the press after Philby's defection. Living with Philby proved difficult; as well as being an alcoholic, he suffered from depression, sometimes self-harming. Pukhova helped him through it and made his life better after his defection. After Philby's controversial death in 1988, Pukhova fought against the rumours of suicide and held fast that he had died of a heart condition. She said to Helen Womack of The Independent, "The suicide story is rubbish, to put it mildly". Rumours of Philby's suicide attempts were never confirmed.

== Written works ==
Pukhova wrote two memoirs about her life with Philby. One, titled "Island on the Sixth Floor" was included in I Did It My Way, a collection of works about Kim Philby. It also included some autobiographical chapters by Philby titled "My Hidden War". She also wrote the memoir titled The Private Life of Kim Philby: The Moscow Years. Also included in this book are some unpublished chapters from Philby's autobiography, a foreword by his friend Michael Bogdanov, and essays from Mikhail Lyubimov and Hayden Peake. The book focuses mostly on the relationship between Pukhova and Philby and not his work as a double agent for the KGB.
