= Nicholas Elliott =

British intelligence officer (1916–1994)

- Elliott in the 1940s
- Born: 15 November 1916; London
- Died: 13 April 1994 (aged 77); London
- Education: Trinity College, Cambridge
- Spouse: Elizabeth Holberton
- Espionage activity
- Country: United Kingdom
- Allegiance: United Kingdom

John Nicholas Rede Elliott (15 November 1916 – 13 April 1994) was an MI6 intelligence officer. His MI6 career was notable for his involvement with the Lionel Crabb affair in the 1950s and the flight of Elliott's close friend and double agent Kim Philby to Moscow in 1963.

== Early life and education ==
Elliott was born in London, the son of Claude Aurelius Elliott, a don at Cambridge and headmaster at Eton, where Nicholas was sent after Durnford School, a prep school on the Isle of Purbeck in Dorset.

In 1935, Elliott was admitted to study history at Trinity College, Cambridge, his father's college. As Ben Macintyre notes, during his time as an undergraduate Elliott 'seldom opened a book and emerged after three years with many friends and a third-class degree, a result he considered "a triumph over the examiners."' Soon after his graduation, in 1938, he was offered a post as an Honorary Attache at The Hague by Sir Nevile Bland. His career in secret intelligence came by chance. Sir Hugh Sinclair, Head of MI6, happened to visit The Hague, took to Elliott and offered him a job.

In 1943, he married Elizabeth Holberton, with whom he had one son and a daughter, Claudia, later a sub-editor at The Observer.

== Intelligence career ==
Elliott was Honorary attaché at the British Embassy in The Hague from 1938 to 1940. During the Second World War he served as an acting lieutenant in the Intelligence Corps. Stationed in Istanbul, he was instrumental in the recruitment of Erich Vermehren, who provided the British with detailed confidential information on the workings of German intelligence. After the war he became head of station for the Secret Intelligence Service at the British Embassy in Bern in 1945 and then head of station in Vienna in 1953. He returned to London in 1956 and then served as head of station in Beirut from 1960 to 1962. While in Beirut he engineered the removal of George Blake to London where Blake was tried for the betrayal of British agents to the KGB.

Elliott's intelligence career was marked by two extraordinary events: the death of Royal Navy Commander Lionel Crabb in 1956, and the flight of British double agent Kim Philby to Moscow in 1963. Elliott and MI6 suffered criticism in both cases that he felt deeply to the end of his life. He was awarded the US Legion of Merit for his services to the Office of Strategic Services.

=== Death of Commander Crabb ===
In 1956, during Nikita Khrushchev's visit to Britain, the Soviet Sverdlov-class cruiser Ordzhonikidze visited Portsmouth Harbour. The Royal Navy was interested in the anti-submarine warfare equipment carried under the cruiser's stern. Elliott arranged for Crabb, an experienced ex-naval frogman, to investigate. He made one run under the ship, came back for an extra pound weight for his next attempt and failed to return from the second dive. Elliott speculated in his autobiography that Crabb suffered equipment failure. Subsequent criticism of Crabb, who Elliott believed to be a brave and honourable officer and who had undertaken operations of the same kind before, was resented by Elliott. The Soviets, who had reported a diver in trouble near the stern, did not complain but also denied responsibility for Crabb's death. The matter leaked, Prime Minister Anthony Eden protested that he had not been informed, and adverse publicity ensued. Elliott claimed to have been told the operation had been cleared by the Foreign Office.

=== Escape of Kim Philby ===
In With My Little Eye, Elliott gives an account of his last contacts with Kim Philby, in 1963. Philby, with whom Elliott had worked in Beirut, had been a friend, and Elliott felt his betrayal bitterly. He volunteered to confront Philby to obtain a written confession of his espionage. Though Philby did confess to Elliott, he delayed signing a confession and fled to Moscow, where he was granted Soviet citizenship. Public criticism of MI6, which had failed to guard against his escape, was significant. Elliott, however, felt he could not have prevented Philby's flight.

The British espionage television series, A Spy Among Friends, based on the book by Ben Macintyre, depicts Elliott's role in Philby's career. Elliott is played by Damian Lewis. According to Ben Macintyre, it is possible that Philby was allowed to flee to Moscow to avoid an embarrassing trial and records suspicions that a typical British Establishment old boy network had intervened for the mutual convenience of MI6 and Philby.

== Retirement ==
In retirement Elliott was a director at Lonrho from 1963 to 1969 and then an executive director there from 1969 to 1973.

== Death ==
Elliott died in London on 13 April 1994, aged 77.

== Bibliography ==
- Elliot, Nicholas (1991). Never Judge a Man by his Umbrella. Michael Russell Publishing Ltd. ISBN 978-0859551823.
- Elliot, Nicholas (1994). With My Little Eye. Michael Russell Publishing Ltd. ISBN 978-0859552004.
