= Ivan Kudrya =

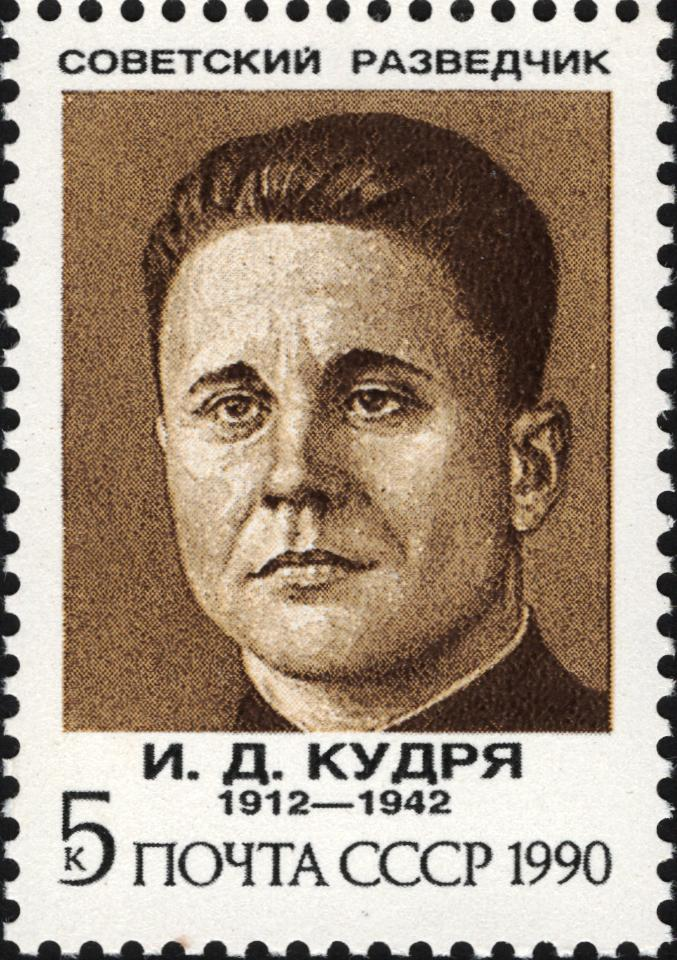
1990 stamp showing Kudrya.

Ivan Danilovich Kudrya (7 July 1912 - November 1942) was a Ukrainian-born Soviet intelligence officer.

== Life ==
=== Early life ===
He was born in the village of Salkiv in Pereyaslavsky Uyezd, Russian Empire (now Protsiv in Boryspil Raion in Ukraine), with two twin elder brothers Mark and Daniil. His father was killed in action in 1916 during the First World War, leaving his wife Anisya Zakharovna with three children to support.

The family lived in Kyiv for a few years, where she worked in a brewery from 1915 to 1921, but life there became difficult and so they returned to Salkovo, where in 1922 she remarried to Vasily Gavrilovich Kutsenko, a peasant, and had three more children with him. In 1926 the family and other settlers moved to the village of Rogachinka in Northern Tavria in search of work. There Ivan worked on a local kulak farm.

=== Early career ===
The family soon joined the collective farm in the village of Shevchenko. Kudrya graduated from the Chaplynka Seven Year Labour School after a year's study and initially moved to the Kyiv Zootechnical Institute. However, he never attended the latter since the Central Committee of the All-Union Leninist Young Communist League instead assigned him to teach three-thousanders in 1931. He trained for this in Kherson for six months before being sent to be headteacher of the primary school in Rogachin. He left that post in 1932 to become a mechanic in Pavlovskaya and from 1933 in the Chaplynka machine tractor station.

In autumn 1934 he was conscripted into the Red Army as an NKVD border guard in Western Ukraine. On May 1935 he entered the NKVD's K. E. Voroshilov Novo-Peterhof Military-Political School, which trained border service commissars. In March 1938 he was mobilised to the NKVD and thus released from that training early. He was assigned to the USSR NKVD's 5th Department of the Main Directorate of State Security in Moscow.

There, in November 1939, he joined the Communist Party of the Soviet Union, having applied a year earlier. Next he was seconded to Lvov, where he joined the Main Directorate-NKVD operational group and fought against the Ukrainian nationalist underground in western Ukraine. On 1 February 1939 Kudrya was promoted to Lietenant in State Security, later rising to Major in Ukraine's NKVD.

=== Left behind in Kyiv ===
In March 1941 he was moved to Kyiv, where he headed one of the departments of the 1st (intelligence) Department of the Ukrainian SSR's NKVD. His focus there remained on Ukrainian nationalists, such as Taras Semenovich, nicknamed "Usatiy", a UPA veteran who Kudrya recruited before the German invasion and then met again by chance in German-occupied Kyiv. Kudrya also became well-known to Colonel Roman Sushko, a member of the OUN's Provod.

A few months before the Wehrmacht occupied Kyiv the local Soviet secret police set up a group of future underground saboteurs — Kudrya's assistants from among Soviet citizens recruited by the NKVD — and provided them with documents, food, money, weapons, and ciphers. Kudrya himself was left behind in Kyiv to collect intelligence and to lead reconnaissance and sabotage units, taking a direct part in preparing and fighting with seven sabotage groups. As one NKVD leader later explained, he was a perfect choice to head the sabotage and intelligence network in this way:

Kudrya was… cool-headed, never lost his head even in the most difficult situation, brave, patient, knew Ukrainian perfectly. In addition, Ivan knew how to get along with people, quickly won sympathy. I don’t know a person who wouldn’t be friendly towards this charming, cheerful, always smiling guy.

The head of the Soviet sabotage and terrorist service, the head of the 4th NKVD Department, General P. Sudoplatov, also recalled that the Germans were not the only targets for Kudrya's group:

[it] was supposed to penetrate the Ukrainian nationalist underground, on which the German command was seriously betting. In recent years, after graduating from the border school, Kudrya had fought with Ukrainian nationalists and knew this movement's features and specific details well. With experience working as part of our operational group in Lviv, he was engaged in investigating ties between Ukrainian nationalists and German intelligence agencies. He was a young, capable, energetic worker.

Kudrya's own sabotage group included the actress R. N. Okipnaya, E. A. Bremer and A. I. Pechenev. His group caused the explosion at the Dormition Cathedral according to some accounts.

=== Death ===
He was betrayed and captured by the Germans on 5 July 1942 and executed in November that year. He was posthumously made a Hero of the Soviet Union and in 1965 granted the Order of Lenin.

== Commemorations ==
Two USSR stamps depicted him, one issued on 23 March 1987 and one as a series of five on 20 November 1990 (the other four showed Stanislav Vaupshasov, Rudolf Abel, Kim Philby and Konon Molody, all also spies). There are also monuments to him near the school in the village of Reyne, Boryspil district, Kyiv region and in the centre of the village of Shevchenkivska, Chaplin district.

== Namesakes ==
- Kyiv:
  - Until 2019 a street (now John McCain Street) was named after him, though there is still a memorial plaque to him on it.
  - Specialized (language) school No. 181 on John McCain Street
- Kyiv Oblast:
  - a street in Boryspil (now Petro Volyanyuk Street)
  - until 21 September 2022 a bust of him stood in his native village of Protsev
- Chaplynka:
  - a street
  - since 1968 a bust by Ivan Bilokur
  - Chaplynka Agricultural Lyceum, with a bust of him near its main building
- Chaplynka Raion:
  - a farm in the village of Khlebodarovka,, with a monument to him erected on its land in 1977
  - Shevchenkivskyi comprehensive secondary school
- a motor ship previously belonging to the Kherson Shipping Company
- Andriy Shershnya Street in the village of Khlibodarivka was previously named after him
