= Stanislav Vaupshasov =

Lithuanian-born Soviet intelligence officer (1899–1976)

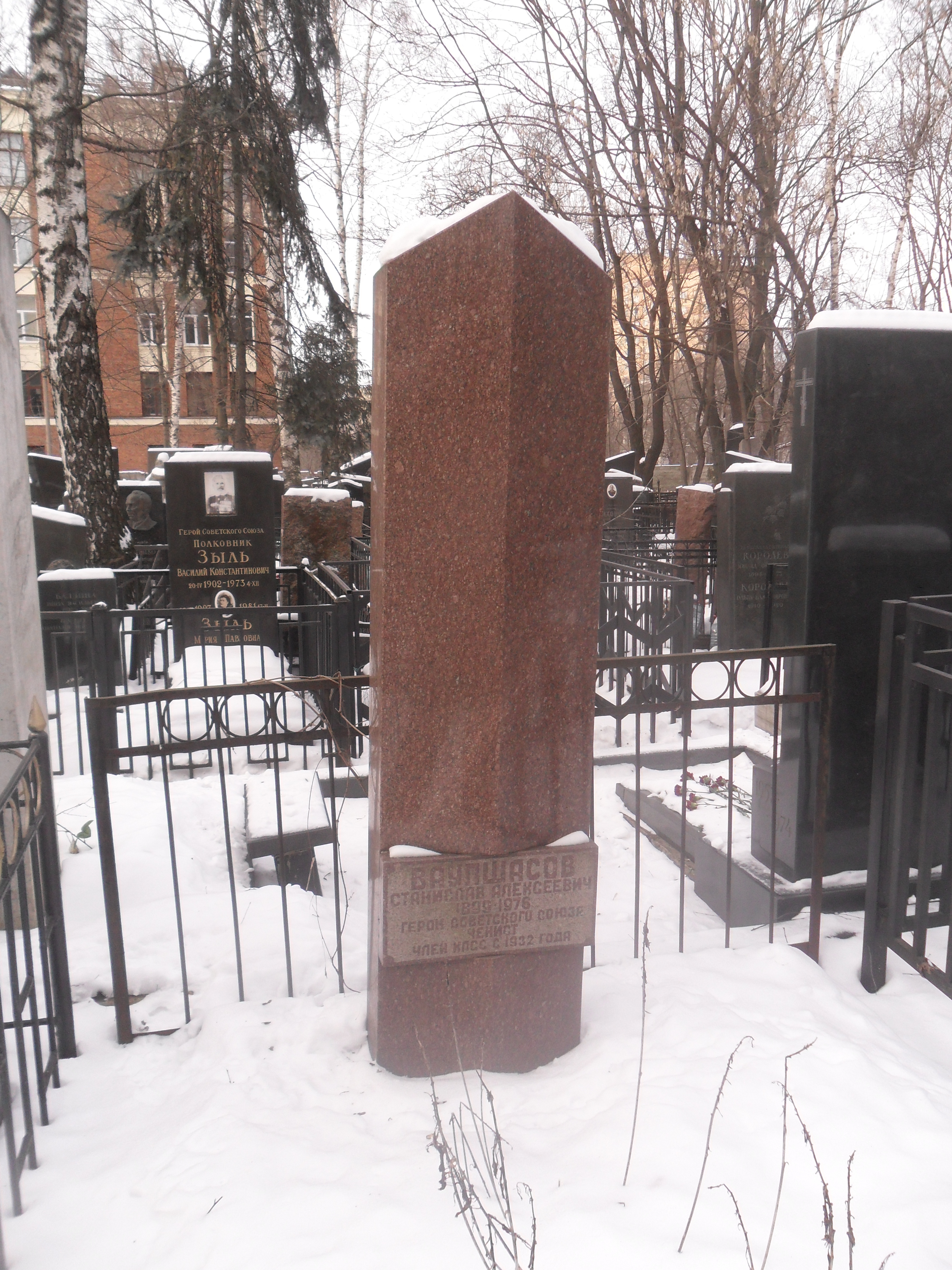
His grave

Stanislav Alekseevich Vaupshasov (Lithuanian: Stanislovas Vaupšas; 27 July 1899 – 19 November 1976) was a Lithuanian-born partisan and intelligence officer for the USSR.

== Life ==
Born in Gruzdziai, Šiauliai County, Russian Empire (now Šiauliai District Municipality, Lithuania), he joined the Red Army in 1918 and fought on the Western Front of the Russian Civil War. From 1920 to 1924 he carried out underground intelligence work in Western Belarus (then part of the newly-formed Second Polish Republic) under the codename Volozhinov.

He graduated from the Red Army's Command Courses in 1927 and from that date onwards worked as an administrator in Moscow. From 1930 onwards he worked in the BSSR's Joint State Political Directorate and headed a section working on the construction of the Moscow Canal.

He returned to the field in 1937 for two years in the Spanish Civil War as senior adviser to the headquarters of the Spanish Republican Army's 14th Partisan Corps. There he specialised in sabotage and reconnaissance operations under the codenames 'Comrade Alfred' and 'Sharov' as well as reconnoitring in the rear of the Francoist forces and (after the Republican defeat) saving the Second Spanish Republic's archives.

In 1939 he joined the NKVD's central office and during the Soviet-Finnish War helped form sabotage and resistance groups. Under the codename 'Yakov' from 1940 to 1941 he remained in Finland and Sweden as a spy. On his return to the USSR he was reassigned to the 'Special Group', the NKVD's 2nd Department. In September 1941 he joined the NKVD's Separate Motorised Rifle Brigade for Special Purposes (OMSBON) and with it fought in the Battle of Moscow.

In March 1942, now under the codename 'Gradov', he led the 'Locals', a detachment of thirty partisans abandoned behind the German rear. They crossed the front line and marched over 1,000 kilometres to join the Minsk region theatre. He remained the detachment's commander until July 1944 and by the time it reunified with the Red Army it had over 700 soldiers.

Whilst under his command the detachment carried out 42 major sabotage operations in Minsk and 15 elsewhere as well as derailing 187 railway trains and several attempts to kill Wilhelm Kube, German General Commissioner of Belarus. For these operations he was made a Hero of the Soviet Union with the Gold Star Medal and Order of Lenin on 5 November 1944. A street in the Partyzanski District of Minsk was also named after him in 1977.

In 1945 he joined the MGB's central office in Moscow, though in August that year he was head of its operational group in Manchuria, tasked with clearing the rear of Japanese agents. In December 1946 he returned to Lithuania as Chief of the Intelligence Department of its MGB, fighting against the Forest Brothers.

He was promoted to Colonel in 1949, retired to the reserve in 1954 and died in Moscow, where he is buried in Section 29 of the Vvedenskoye Cemetery. On 20 November 1990 he was one of five spies featured on a set of stamps designed by B. Ilyukhin for the USSR's postal service - the others were Kim Philby, Konon Molody, Rudolf Abel and Ivan Kudrya.

== Other medals, orders and honours ==
- Order of the Red Banner
- Order of the Patriotic War, 1st and 2nd classes
- Order of the Red Banner of Labour of the BSSR, Knight
- Commemoration of the 100th Anniversary of the Birth of Vladimir Ilyich Lenin Medal
- Partisan of the Patriotic War Medal, 1st class
- Defence of Moscow Medal
- Victory over Germany in the Great Patriotic War Medal
- Victory over Japan Medal
- Twenty Years of Victory in the Great Patriotic War of 1941-1945 Medal
- 25 years of victory in the Great Patriotic War Badge
- Thirty Years of Victory in the Great Patriotic War of 1941-1945 Medal

== Bibliography (in Russian) ==
- Антонов В. С., Карпов В. Н. Разведчики … — М.: Мол. гвардия, 2004. ISBN 5-235-02711-6
- Попов А. Ю. НКВД и партизанское движение. — М.: ОЛМА-ПРЕСС, 2003. ISBN 5-224-04328-X

== External links (in Russian) ==
- Entry on Heroes of the Country
- Biography on the Foreign Intelligence Service of Russia website
- Biography on hrono.ru
- "Red Army soldier, partisan, scout... And again - partisan"
- Legendary intelligence officer and partisan. On the 125th anniversary of the birth of Hero of the Soviet Union Stanislav Vaupshasov ... on Belarusian Telegraph Agency
