= Dancing Ledge =

Part of the Jurassic Coast in England

Coordinates: 50°35′30.35″N 2°0′16.2″W

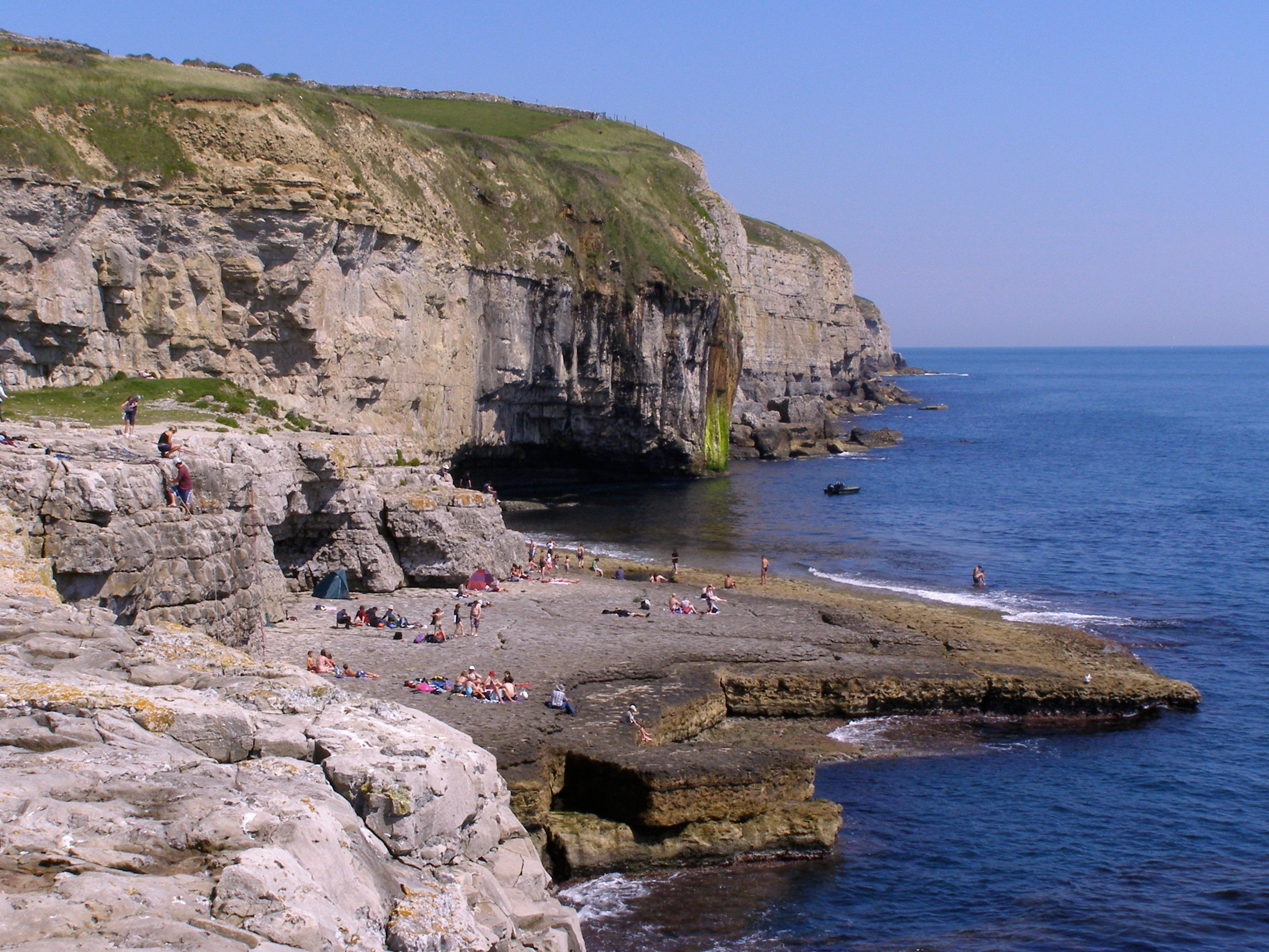
Dancing Ledge from the west

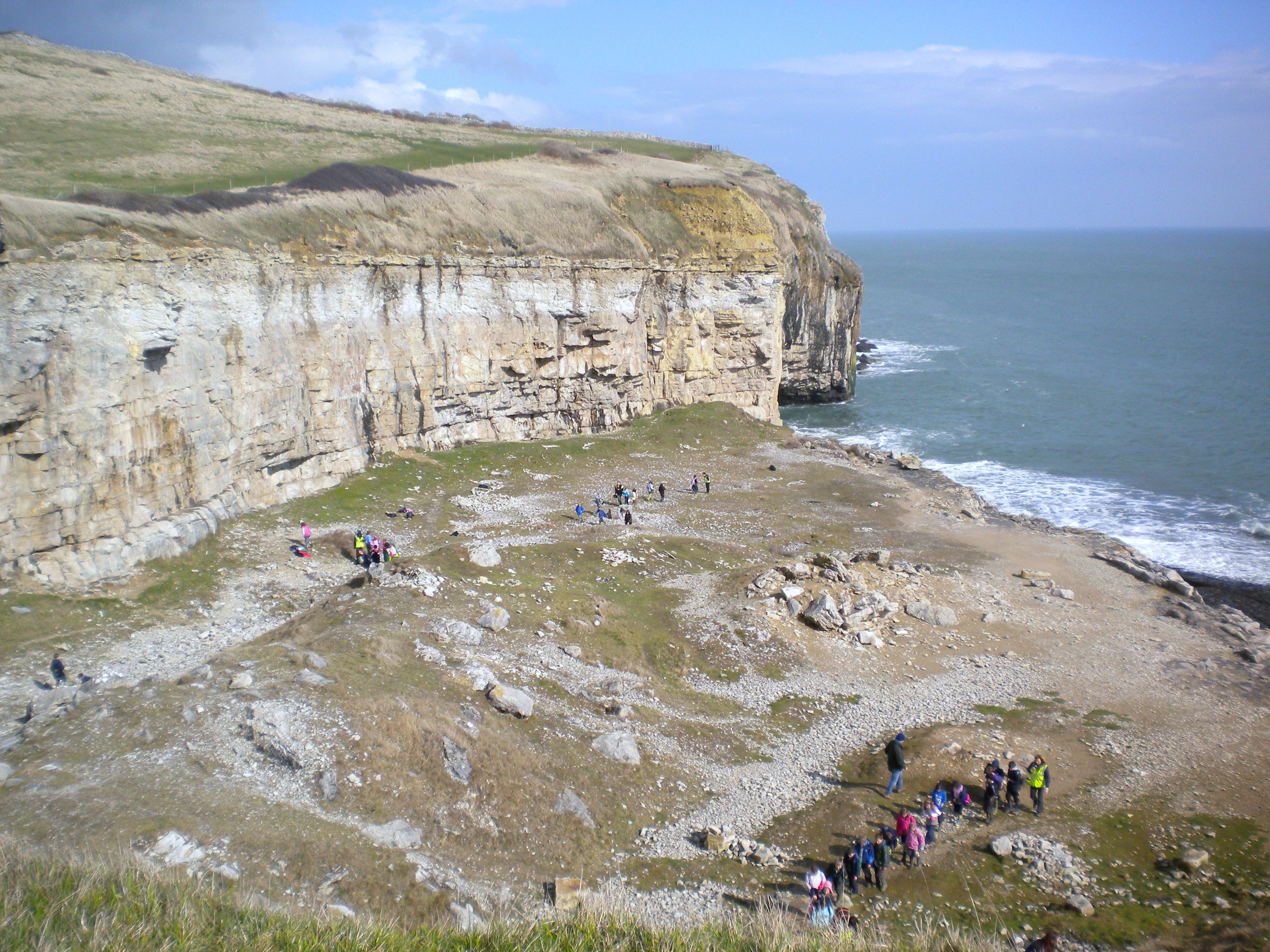
Dancing Ledge seen from the steps

Dancing Ledge is part of the Jurassic Coast near Langton Matravers in the Isle of Purbeck in Dorset, England. Dancing Ledge is a flat area of rock at the base of a small cliff. A little scrambling is required for access. It is signposted on the South West Coast Path a few kilometres west of Swanage. Dancing Ledge is so called because at certain stages of the tide when the waves wash over the horizontal surface, the surface undulations cause the water to bob about making the ledge appear to dance.

== History ==
The area was used for quarrying of Purbeck stone and the ledge is a straight drop off into the sea which is deep enough for small ships to come right up to the ledge. This depth was exploited by local quarrymen in transporting the stone away from the area. Some of the stone removed by the quarrying was transported by ship direct from Dancing Ledge, round the south coast to Kent in order to construct Ramsgate harbour in the 18th and 19th centuries.

== Leisure ==
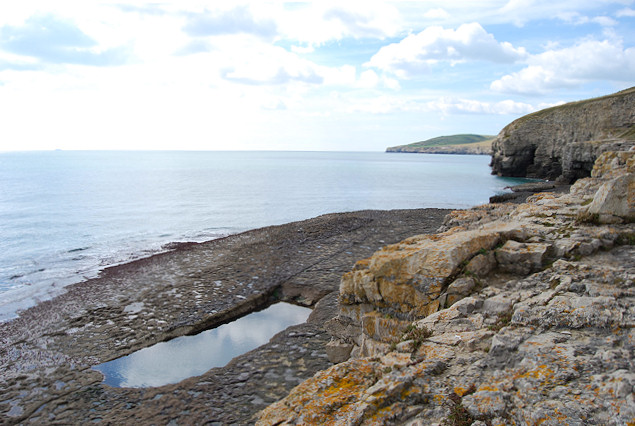
The tidal swimming pool at Dancing Ledge

A swimming pool was blasted into the rock for the use of local preparatory schools, particularly Durnford School sometime near the beginning of the twentieth century. The last surviving school (The Old Malthouse in Langton Matravers, which closed in 2007) and one of the schools for which the pool was originally created recently arranged for debris, including several large rocks, to be removed, making swimming possible once again. The sea itself is not suitable for swimming, as there is no shoreline, simply a rock shelf under which people have been pulled by the current to their deaths.

The cliffs above the ledge are a popular climbing location, with a 10 metres (33 ft) cliff close to the sea, and a larger 20 metres (66 ft) limestone cliff set back above this. It is also a popular spot for tombstoning.

== Gallery ==
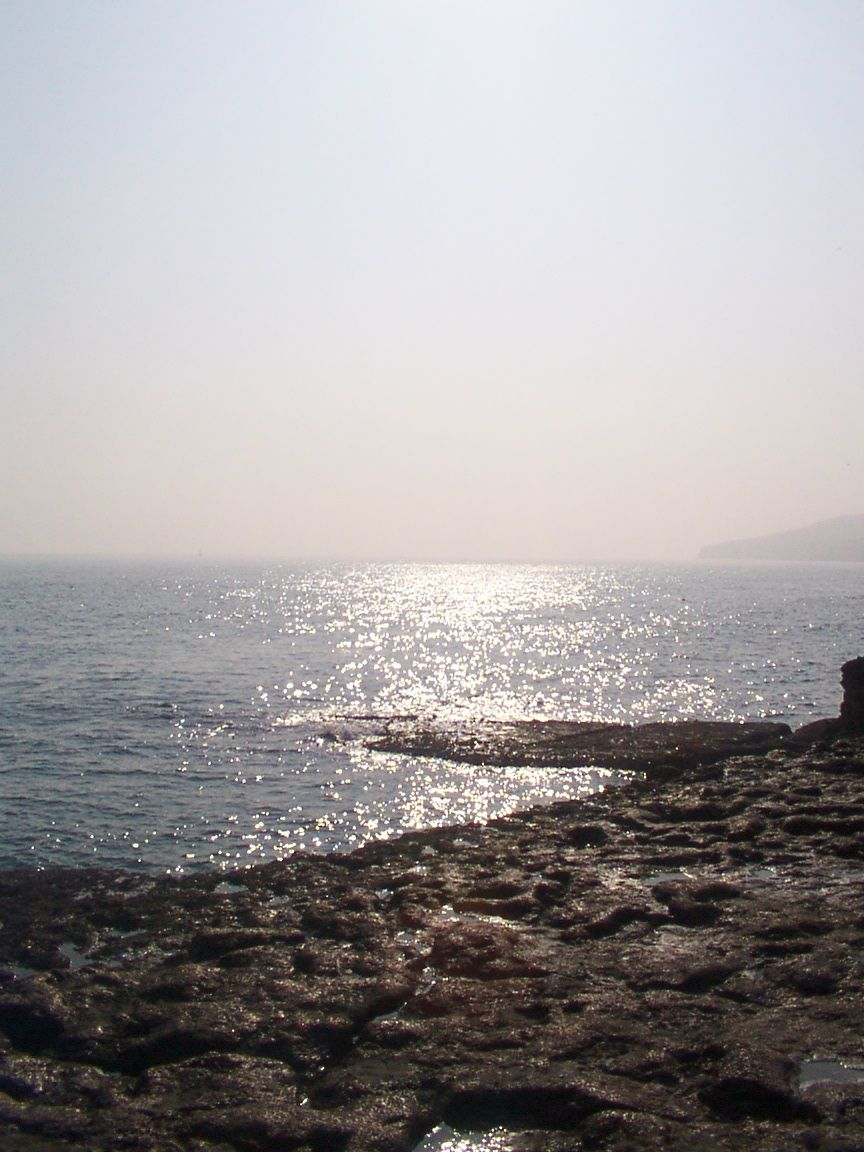
On Dancing Ledge

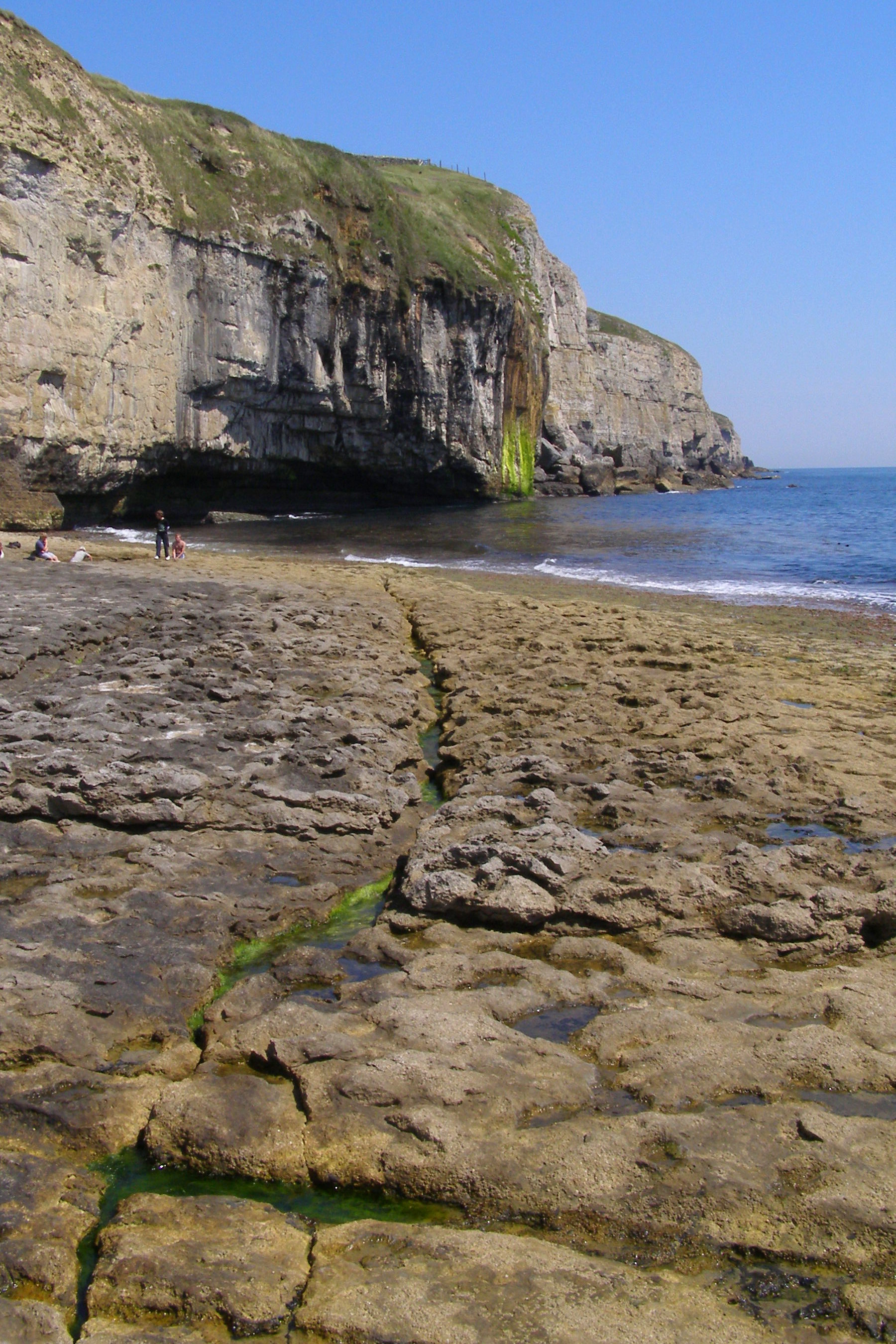
View east from Dancing Ledge
