= Kim Philby: His Most Intimate Betrayal =

2014 British docudrama

- Genre: Docudrama Miniseries
- Written by: Marco Crivellari; Ben Macintyre
- Directed by: Tom McCarthy; Francis Whately
- Starring: Ben Macintyre; David Oakes; William Beck
- Music by: Adrian Williams
- Country of origin: United Kingdom
- Original language: English
- No. of series: 1
- No. of episodes: 2

Production
- Running time: 118 minutes
- Production company: BBC History

Original release
- Network: BBC Two
- Release: 2 April – 3 April 2014

Kim Philby: His Most Intimate Betrayal is a 2014 British docudrama television miniseries. The two-part miniseries chronicles the life of Kim Philby, a British intelligence officer and a double agent for the Soviet Union. The series is produced by Francis Whately, and presented by Ben Macintyre. The first episode premiered on 2 April 2014 on BBC Two, with the next episode airing the following night.

== Synopsis ==
In this two part docudrama miniseries, British author Ben Macintyre examines the life and career of Kim Philby, one of Britain's most infamous spies. Philby, as it turns out, was not only likable and polite, but also a heartless killer, who betrayed all of his friends and colleagues in British and American intelligence.

== Cast ==
- William Beck – Nicholas Elliot
- David Oakes – Kim Philby
- Ben Macintyre – Self
- Mark Elliott – Self
- Rozanne Colchester – Self

== Background ==
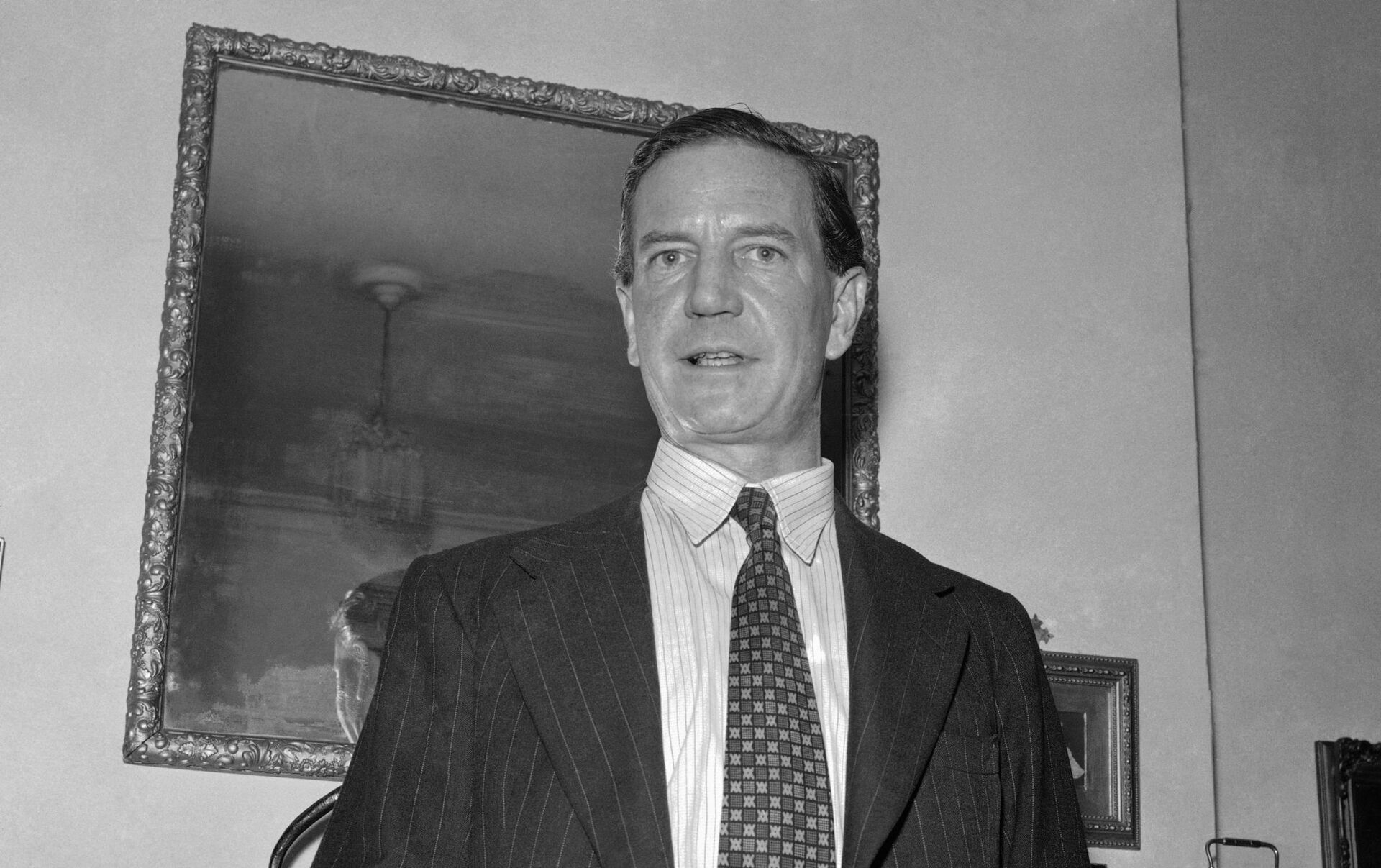
Kim Philby in 1955

Kim Philby was a British intelligence officer and a double agent for the Soviet Union. In 1963 he was revealed to be a member of the Cambridge Five, a spy ring that had divulged British secrets to the Soviets during the Second World War and in the early stages of the Cold War. Of the five, Philby is believed to have been the most successful in providing secret information to the Soviets.

He was recruited by Soviet intelligence in 1934. In 1940 he began working for the United Kingdom's Secret Intelligence Service (SIS or MI6). By the end of the Second World War he had become a high-ranking member. In 1949 Philby was appointed first secretary to the British Embassy in Washington and served as chief British liaison with American intelligence agencies. During his career as an intelligence officer, he passed large amounts of intelligence to the Soviet Union, including the Albanian Subversion, a scheme to overthrow the pro-Soviet government of Communist Albania.

Philby was suspected of tipping off two other spies under suspicion of Soviet espionage, Donald Maclean and Guy Burgess, both of whom subsequently fled to Moscow in May 1951. Under suspicion himself, Philby resigned from MI6 in July 1951 but was publicly exonerated by then-Foreign Secretary Harold Macmillan in 1955. He resumed his career as both a journalist and a spy for MI6 in Beirut, but was forced to defect to Moscow after finally being unmasked as a Soviet agent in 1963. Philby lived in Moscow until his death in 1988.

== Release ==
Episode one was released on 2 April 2014, and it was produced and directed by Francis Whately. Episode two was released the following night on 3 April 2014, and it was produced and directed by Tom McCarthy. It was broadcast on BBC Two, with Whately being the overall series producer. In 2015, the miniseries made its way to the United States, where it was shown on PBS stations.

== Reception ==
James Walton of The Daily Telegraph wrote that "Philby's story has of course been told many times, but this programme reminded us why: because it's completely irresistible. Not only does it startlingly combine the personal and the worldhistorical, but it also reveals the British class system in all its tragi–comic pomp. The programme reconstructed their conversations rather in the style of a Stephen Poliakoff drama". British journalist Andrew Billen noted that "it was of course, a story hard to tell badly, but for once in an historical documentary, the re-enactments felt right ...the film's gimmicks were witty even when unnecessary ... and as E. M. Forster once said, he would rather betray his country than his friend ... Philby, more reptile than primate, did both".

Television critic Clive James, opined that while "the story of Philby is inherently fascinating, the half documentary, half drama format chosen for the show drained the action of all narrative force. Only some of the blame could be assigned to the on–screen narrator, Ben Macintyre. Utterly undynamic in personal appearance, he might, if used sparingly, have functioned as a piquant contrast between our everyday lives as free citizens and the suffocating milieu of the traitors who gave their allegiance to tyranny. Alas, the show's producers chose not only to make Macintyre himself the central figure, but they sexed him up with a hat, a coat and briefcase all meant to evoke espionage. The results were unintentionally hilarious, and I spent a lot of time groaning and yelling".

Tom Birchenough of The Arts Desk said "David Oakes as Philby made us understand the man's charms, not to mention his verve, as he outplayed the rather nerdy Nicholas Elliot, portrayed by William Beck". In his review for The Independent, Will Dean states the series is "told in an odd smorgasbord of formats. There were reconstructions of Philby and Elliott's conversations played by actors. Then there were other sort-of reconstructions in which Macintyre himself performed the roles of various characters". Dean says that in the end though, it is "Macintyre's narrative that paints Philby – thoroughly – as a very English traitor". Euan Ferguson of The Observer wrote that "journalist Ben Macintyre, who has unearthed all this, paced the two nights of the series with just the right recipe of pop-cultural intrigue and erudition".

== Episodes ==
No.	Title	Directed by	Written by	Original release date
1	"Kim Philby: His Most Intimate Betrayal"	Francis Whately	Ben Macintyre	2 April 2014
In this episode, through Macintyre's narration, we learn that not only was Philby a ruthless killer, who betrayed everyone around him, it was his friendship with his colleague at MI6, Nicholas Elliott, who unintentionally supplied him with state secrets, which became pivotal to Philby's success of becoming a double-spy. Macintyre describes Philby as a "caricature of the gentleman spy".
2	"Kim Philby: His Most Intimate Betrayal"	Tom McCarthy	Ben Macintyre	3 April 2014
It's 1951, and Philby's superiors at MI6 have grown suspicious that he is a Soviet agent, so he is summoned back to London to face interrogation. Nicholas Elliott defends Philby's reputation, insisting that he is innocent. After being cleared of any wrongdoing, Philby spends the next 12 years deceiving Elliot. Then, in January 1963, Philby's luck runs out as he meets Elliot for the last time and he confronts Philby, with what they now know to be the undeniable truth.

== See also ==
Other members of the Cambridge Five

- Anthony Blunt
- Guy Burgess
- John Cairncross
- Donald Maclean

== Sources ==
- Macintyre, Ben (2014). Kim Philby: His Most Intimate Betrayal (video). Francis Whately; Tom McCarthy. BBC Two.
