= The Old Malthouse School =

Location
- Langton Matravers; Swanage, Dorset, BH19 3HB; England; 50.6098°N 2.00342°W

Information
- Type: EY Setting
- Established: 1906
- Founder: Rex Corbett
- Closed: 2007 (re-opened as a science centre, 2008)
- Local authority: Dorset
- Department for Education URN: 516194 Tables

The Old Malthouse School (The OMH) was a preparatory school in the village of Langton Matravers near Swanage in the Isle of Purbeck, Dorset, United Kingdom.

The school was founded in 1906 by Rex Corbett, an ex-England football player, and started with ten pupils in a building that was formerly a brewery. Tom Pellatt, his brother-in-law who ran Durnford School at Durnford Court in the same village had blasted out a swimming bath in the rocks at Dancing Ledge, a mile and a half away on the coast and the pupils of both schools used this daily in the summer term. Durnford's most famous former pupil is Ian Fleming, author of the James Bond novels and Chitty Chitty Bang Bang.

In 1939, the school was sold by Corbett to Victor Haggard (H) and Evan Hope-Gill (Hopper) who inherited 37 boys. Durnford was requisitioned by the army later that year and the Durnford boys transferred to the Old Malthouse. Durnford was acquired by the owners of the Old Malthouse when the army gave it up in 1948. The main buildings were variously pulled down or sold, leaving the OMH with the grounds, which were levelled for playing fields. A third joint headmaster Peter Mattinson joined after World War II and the triumvirate ruled until 1974 when the school, then with about 80 boys, was sold to a Trust under the headmastership of Quintin Ambler. Ill-health led to Ambler's early departure to be replaced as headmaster by Patrick Jordan in 1975 who expanded the school by adding a pre-prep department in the early 1980s. In 1988, Jon Phillips took over as Headmaster, remaining for 15 years. During this time the school became fully co-educational. Richard Keeble became Headmaster in January 2004 and left the school in July 2006 handing over the reins to longtime deputy Moira Laffey. Through the 1970s and early 80s the school expanded to about 100 pupils but declining enrollment and increasing losses led to the decision to close the school in 2007.

In April 2007, the local press reported that the school would close at the end of the 2007 summer term and the school subsequently closed its doors at the end of the summer.

== Reopening ==
In 2008, the property was acquired and reopened by the Cothill Educational Trust as a science-based centre, running week-long practical science courses for schoolchildren aged 10–13.
