= A Spy Among Friends =

British television series

- Promotional poster
- Genre: Drama; Espionage; Spy thriller
- Based on: A Spy Among Friends by Ben Macintyre
- Written by: Alexander Cary
- Directed by: Nick Murphy
- Starring: Damian Lewis; Guy Pearce
- Country of origin: United Kingdom
- Original language: English
- No. of episodes: 6

Production
- Executive producers: Alexander Cary; Alan Gasmer; Peter Jaysen; Patrick Spence; Nick Murphy
- Producers: Chrissy Skinns; Damian Lewis
- Running time: 51–60 minutes
- Production companies: FLW; Ginger Biscuit Entertainment; ITV Studios; Sony Pictures Television Studios

Original release
- Network: ITVX (UK); MGM+ (US)
- Release: 8 December 2022

A Spy Among Friends is a British espionage thriller television series, starring Guy Pearce, Damian Lewis, and Anna Maxwell Martin. It is based on the book by Ben Macintyre, adapted by Alex Cary and directed by Nick Murphy. It was available to stream on ITVX in the United Kingdom from December 2022, Amazon Prime Video in Canada from February 2023, and MGM+ in the United States from March 2023.

== Synopsis ==
In 1963, Nicholas Elliott is working for Britain's Secret Intelligence Service (SIS) as an intelligence officer and is left in turmoil when he learns his close friend and colleague, Kim Philby, has been secretly working as a double agent for the KGB since 1934. Elliot interviews him in Beirut and then Philby defects to the Soviet Union.

== Cast ==
- Damian Lewis as Nicholas Elliott
- Guy Pearce as Kim Philby
- Anna Maxwell Martin as Lily Thomas
- Adrian Edmondson as Sir Roger Hollis
- Stephen Kunken as James Jesus Angleton
- Nicholas Rowe as Sir Anthony Blunt
- Thomas Arnold as Guy Burgess
- Daniel Lapaine as Donald Maclean
- Monika Gossmann as Galina
- Karel Roden as Col. Sergei Brontov
- Anastasia Hille as Flora Solomon
- Edward Baker-Duly as Ian Fleming
- Radosław Kaim as Konstantin Dmitrievich Volkov

== Episodes ==
No.	Title	Directed by	Written by	Original release date
1	"Boom-ooh-yatatatah"	Nick Murphy	Alexander Cary	8 December 2022
2	"The Admiral's Glass"	Nick Murphy	Alexander Cary	8 December 2022
3	"Allegory of the Catholic Faith"	Nick Murphy	Alexander Cary	8 December 2022
4	"Vodka"	Nick Murphy	Alexander Cary	8 December 2022
5	"Snow"	Nick Murphy	Alexander Cary	8 December 2022
6	"No Man's Land"	Nick Murphy	Alexander Cary	8 December 2022

== Production ==
A Spy Among Friends is based on the book by Ben Macintyre, adapted by Alex Cary and directed by Nick Murphy.

Principal photography took place in London, England, and Romania, and finished in spring 2022.

== Broadcast ==
Broadcast in the United Kingdom on the streaming service ITVX was moved with a delay in the launch of ITVX from 1 November 2022 to 8 December 2022. In February 2023, the series became available in Canada via Amazon Prime Video. The series became available on MGM+ from 12 March 2023 in the United States. In the UK, it was first broadcast on free-to-air ITV1 in July 2023.

== Reception ==
=== Critical response ===
The review aggregator website Rotten Tomatoes reported an 88% approval rating based on 25 critic reviews. The website's critics consensus reads, "'More cerebral than outright thrilling, A Spy Among Friends is an intelligent tale of espionage elevated by a pair of sterling performances." Metacritic, which uses a weighted average, gave a score of 74 out of 100 based on ning critics, indicating "generally favorable" reviews.

Rebecca Nicholson of The Guardian writing, "There are plenty of small thrills to be had from a world built on codes and double meanings." Stephanie Bunbury of Deadline Hollywood wrote that the "unfolding of their negotiations" was "not seat-of-your-pants televisual excitement, but it is the stuff of sustained intrigue". Jay Skelton of Reel Mockery called A Spy Among Friends "frustrating to watch". Nick Hilton of The Independent wrote that "there is much to enjoy about A Spy Among Friends".

=== Accolades ===
The series was nominated in the best miniseries category at the British Academy Television Awards, announced in March 2023.
