= Mikhail Lyubimov =

Russian novelist and retired KGB colonel (born 1934)

- Михаил Любимов
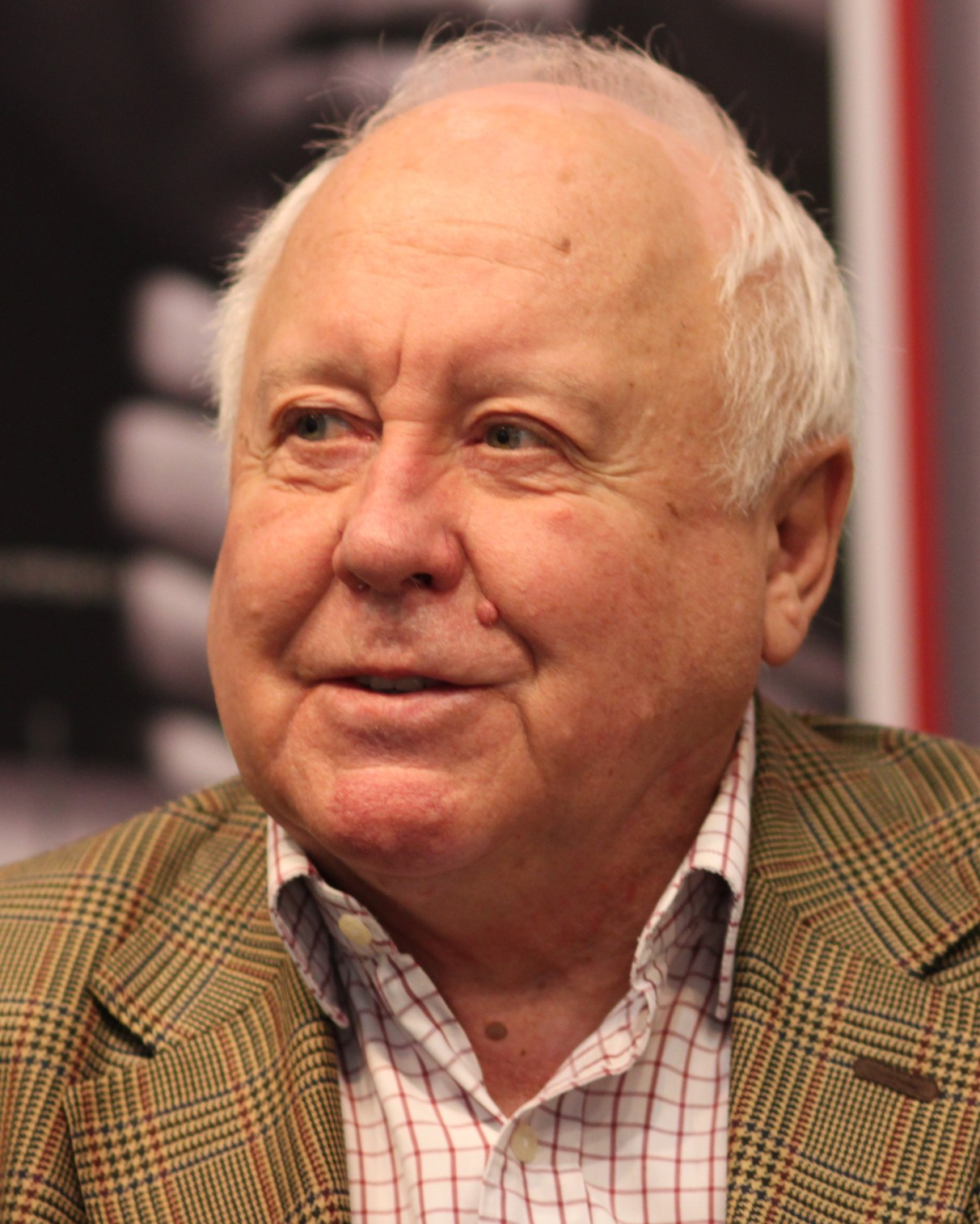
- Lyubimov in 2010
- Born: Mikhail Petrovich Lyubimov; 27 May 1934 (age 92); Dnipropetrovsk, Ukrainian SSR, Soviet Union
- Education: Moscow State Institute of International Relations
- Children: Alexander Lyubimov
- Espionage activity
- Allegiance: Soviet Union
- Service branch: KGB
- Service years: 1959–1980
- Rank: Colonel

Mikhail Petrovich Lyubimov (Russian: Михаи́л Петро́вич Люби́мов; born 27 May 1934) is a Russian novelist and retired colonel in the KGB. He served as spymaster and head of the KGB stations in the United Kingdom and Denmark during the Cold War.

== Early life and family ==
Lyubimov was born in Dnipropetrovsk, Ukrainian SSR. His father, Pyotr Fyodorovich Lyubimov, joined the Cheka-OGPU in 1918. In 1938, he was arrested during the Great Purge but released, and returned to military intelligence in the Carpathian and Volga Military Districts.

Lyubimov graduated from high school in Kuybyshev (now Samara) in 1952. He then attended the Moscow State Institute of International Relations, graduating in 1958. He wrote a doctoral thesis titled English National Character and Its Use in Operational Work.

== Career ==
After his graduation, Lyubimov was sent to Finland to work at the Soviet embassy's consulate office. In 1959, he was recruited into First Chief Directorate of the KGB. Two years later, Lyubimov went to the United Kingdom, where he worked in the Soviet residency in London as Second Secretary of the Embassy as an ordinary field officer.

Lyubimov worked under the guise of being the press attaché, allowing him to associate socially with the British elite and political officials. He was dubbed "Smiley Mike" by his British counterparts. In 1964, Lyubimov's cover was blown in a failed attempt to recruit a cipher machine operator to spy for the Soviets. The British tried to recruit him, he refused, was declared persona non grata and was recalled to Moscow, where he continued as spymaster of the British section.

Lyubimov was next sent to Copenhagen from 1967 to 1969, where he was a colleague of Oleg Gordievsky. In 1974, he became Deputy Chief of the Anglo-Scandinavian Department. At that time he worked closely with Kim Philby. In 1976, he was sent back to Copenhagen, where he corresponded by mail with Philby. The collection of their letters is now archived at Georgetown University. After four years in Denmark, he returned home to Moscow and retired from the KGB in 1980.

== Writing ==
Lyubimov's first book was The Life and Adventures of Alex Wilkie, Spy in 1989, about a Russian agent in London trying to find a mole leaking intelligence to the Americans. A 2015 Russian film directed by Vladimir Bortko, Soul of a Spy, was adapted from it.

His experiences helped him contribute to The KGB Guidebook to Cities of the World, a collection of stories and humorous anecdotes from seven retired KGB agents. The book was so popular a second volume was published.

== Personal life ==
Lyubimov has been married three times. His son, Alexander, is a well-known television presenter.

== Bibliography ==
- Mikhail Lyubimov (2010). Англия. Гуляния с Чеширским котом (Celebrations with the Cheshire Cat). Amfora. ISBN 978-5-367-01435-8.
- Mikhail Lyubimov (2005). Блеск и нищета шпионажа (The Splendor and Misery of Espionage). AST Olimp. ISBN 5-17-028809-3.
- Mikhail Lyubimov (2001). Гуляния с Чеширским Котом (Festivities with the Cheshire Cat). Amfora. ISBN 5-94278-183-4.
- Mikhail Lyubimov (2003) Скитания по родословным. Москва, Б.С.Г.-ПРЕСС. ISBN 5-93381 -111-4
- Mikhail Lyubimov (1998). Декамерон шпионов (Decameron Spies). Tsentrpoligraf. ISBN 5-227-00135-9.
- Mikhail Lyubimov (1997). Шпионы, которых я люблю и ненавижу (Spies I love and hate). AST Olimp. ISBN 5-7390-0009-2.
- Mikhail Lyubimov; et al. (1997). Путеводитель КГБ по городам мира. Книга вторая (The KGB Guide to Cities Around the World: Book 2). Top Secret. ISBN 978-5-85275-144-7.
- Mikhail Lyubimov; et al. (1996). Путеводитель КГБ по городам мира (The KGB Guide to Cities Around the World). Top Secret. ISBN 5-85275-132-4.
- Mikhail Lyubimov (1995). Записки непутевого резидента или will o' the wisp (Notes of the Ne'er resident or Will-o'-the-wisp). Художественная литература. ISBN 5-280-03067-8.
- Mikhail Lyubimov (1993). Жизнь и приключения Алекса Уилки, шпиона (The Life and Adventures of Alex Wilkie, Spy). Ogonyok. ISBN 5-88274-011-8.
- Mikhail Lyubimov (2016) A kind of chef-d'oeuvre. Amfora Вариант шедевра
