= Konstantin Volkov (diplomat) =

Soviet spy for Britain

- Born: Константин Волков
- Occupations: Vice Consul, Istanbul, Turkey
- Known for: failed defection in September 1945 betrayed by British Soviet double agent Kim Philby
- Espionage activity
- Country: Soviet Union
- Agency: NKVD

Konstantin Volkov (Russian: Константин Волков; disappeared September 1945, presumed dead) was an NKVD officer in Turkey who vanished after wanting to defect to the United Kingdom. He disappeared after telling the British Consulate General in Istanbul he would name three high-ranking double agents working in London for the Soviet intelligence service. One of these agents was Kim Philby who tipped off the Russians about what Volkov and his wife were planning. It took Philby three weeks to arrive which was enough time for Soviet security agents to find the couple and take them back to Moscow.

The couple were reportedly last seen boarding a Moscow-bound plane in Istanbul. The British Consulate in Istanbul denounced Philby's behaviour as criminal negligence. However, the Soviet spy was able to allay suspicions of himself by arguing persuasively that he had not been to blame for his delayed travel.

== Failed defection ==
=== Approach ===
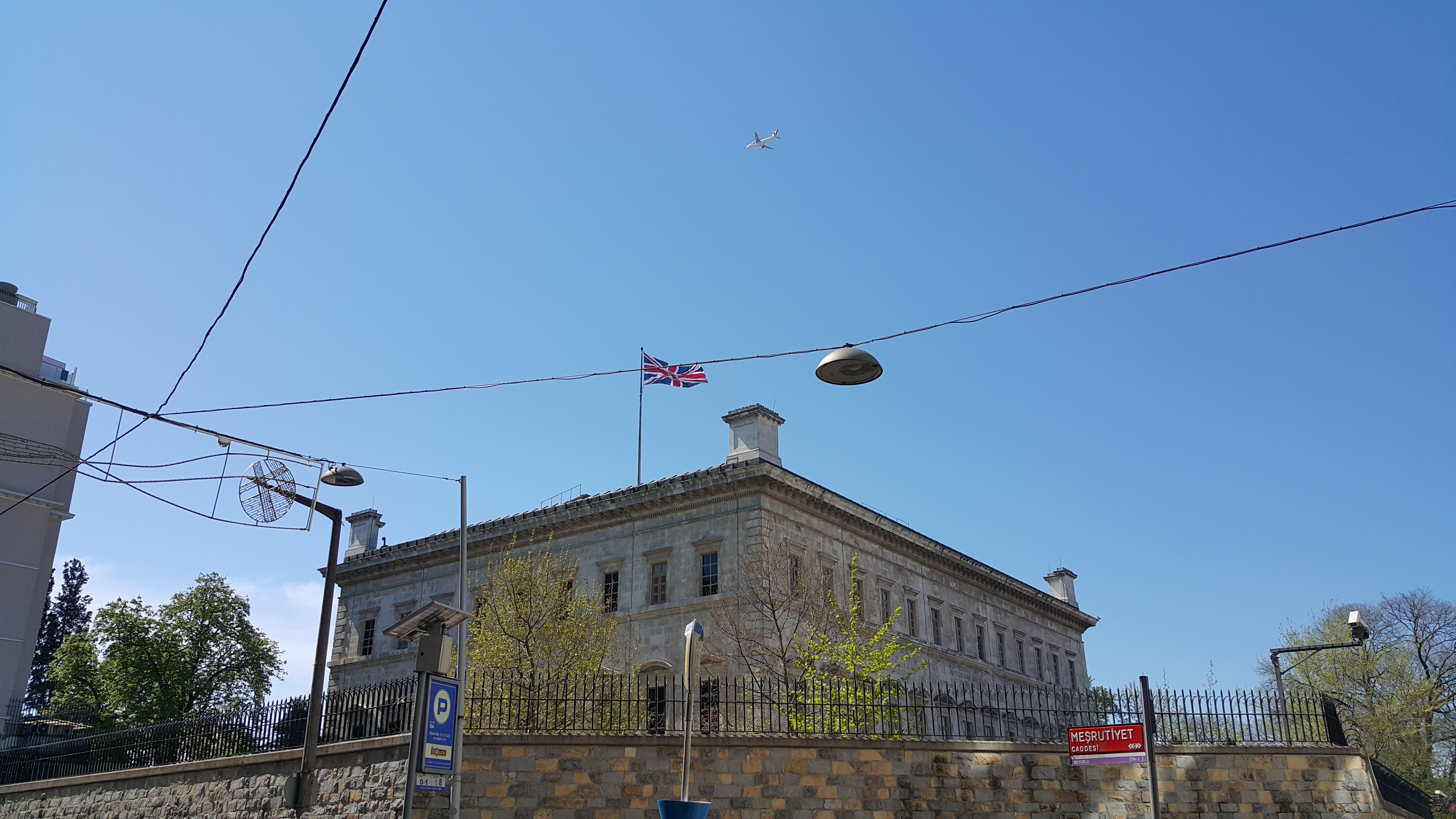
The British Consulate General in Istanbul where Konstantin Volkov and his wife asked to defect in September 1945.

In late August 1945, Konstantin Volkov, Vice Consul for the Soviet Union in Istanbul, sent a letter to Chantry Hamilton Page, the vice consul in the British Consulate General in Istanbul, requesting an urgent appointment. Page decided the letter was a "prank" and ignored it. A few days later, on 4 September, Volkov accompanied with his wife Zoya arrived in person and asked for a meeting with Page.

Page did not speak Russian, and so he brought in John Leigh Reed, first secretary at the consulate to translate for Volkov. Reed later reported:

"I was serving in our embassy in Turkey in 1945.... One morning this Russian walks into reception looking very nervous and asks to see the acting consul-general, Chantry Page. The Russian is Konstantin Volkov, Page's opposite number in the Soviet embassy. I'd done my Russian exams so I get the job as interpreter. Anyway, it turns out that Volkov is really an NKVD officer and he has decided to defect. He says he wants a laissez-passer for himself and his wife to Cyprus and £27,500. In return he is offering the real names of three Soviet agents working in Britain. He says two of them are working in the Foreign Office, one the head of a counter-espionage organisation in London."

=== Demands ===
Volkov was specifically willing to expose 314 Soviet agents in Turkey and 250 Soviet agents in Britain, in return for £27,500 (roughly a £1 million in 2023) and a promise of political asylum. He also said he knew the names of two British diplomats (later revealed to be Guy Burgess and Donald Maclean) in the Foreign Office and a very high-ranking officer in the Counter Intelligence Section of MI6 of the British Secret Intelligence Service (SIS) (later revealed to be Kim Philby) who were spying for the Soviet Union.

=== Betrayal ===
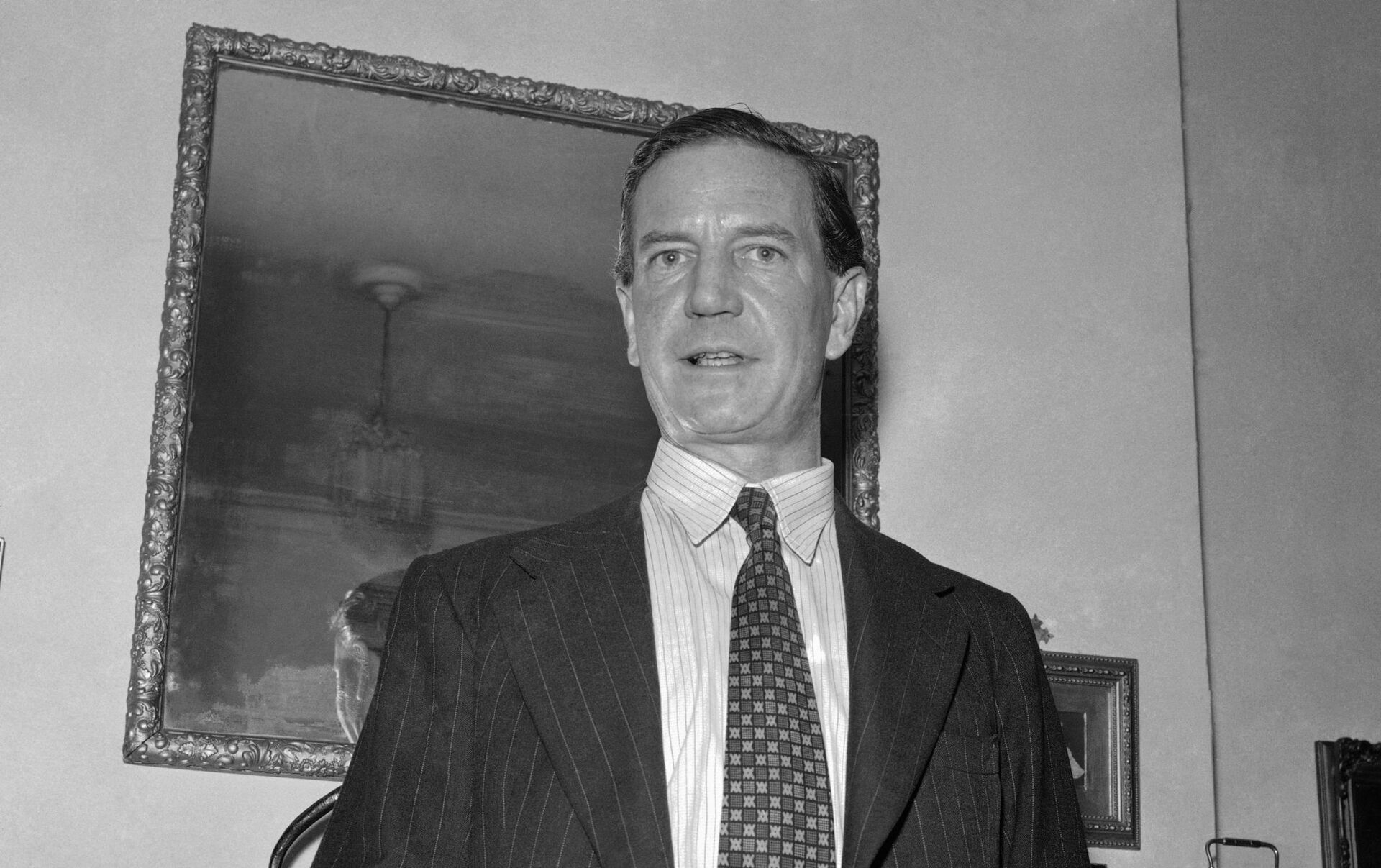
Soviet British agent Kim Philby in 1955.

Volkov demanded an answer within three weeks. But he insisted that his request was not to be sent by cable from Istanbul because the Soviets were reading British Cipher System traffic. Instead the news by diplomatic courier took a week to reach Sir Stewart Menzies, head of the SIS in London.

Volkov was passed to the head of the Russian Section, Kim Philby. As a Soviet mole, Philby saw the threat to his cover and informed his Soviet handlers. He then stalled his flight to Istanbul for three weeks by enmeshing himself with cross-departmental bureaucracy between the SIS and the Foreign Office. This hold up gave Soviet counter-intelligence agents enough time to reach Istanbul and Volkov first.

=== Disappearance ===
In the three weeks it took Philby to reach Turkey, Volkov and his wife had vanished and could not be found. Reports say he returned to the Soviet Consulate from where he quickly disappeared. He was last seen - as a heavily bandaged figure - along with his wife being hustled aboard a Soviet transport plane bound for Moscow.

== Aftermath ==
Philby vigorously defended himself against the charges made by Consulate officials, who had met with Volkov, that his actions were criminally incompetent. Philby was quick to point out that his 21-day delay was first caused by the slow pace of couriers reaching London. Second that the SIS and the Foreign Office could not agree who should oversee the defection because the approach was made through diplomatic channels. Thirdly it was discovered that phone lines between the British Consulate in Istanbul and the British Embassy in Ankara had been tapped by Soviet intelligence, and that there had been calls where Volkov's name had been mentioned during this period. This evidence was enough to provide Philby with enough plausible deniability that he had failed Volkov.

Philby's cover was not blown but it did raise suspicions about his character and his loyalties. Six years later after Volkov he was eventually dismissed from MI6 in 1951 due to a series of suspicious incidents. It was not until 1963 that Philby's identity as a Soviet agent was finally confirmed when he defected to the Soviet Union. Years later, while in the USSR, Philby admitted to having informed his NKVD contact about Volkov prior to his own departure for Istanbul. He contemptuously described Volkov as "a nasty piece of work" and referred to the incident as the greatest obstacle he ever faced as a double agent.

== See also ==
- List of Eastern Bloc defectors
