= Ben Macintyre =

British columnist and author (born 1963)

- Macintyre in 2026
- Born: Benedict Richard Pierce MacIntyre; 25 December 1963 (age 62); Oxford, Oxfordshire, England
- Education: St John's College, Cambridge
- Occupation: Author

Benedict Richard Pierce Macintyre (born 25 December 1963) is a British writer. He has written many books, and received numerous awards for both fiction and non-fiction works.

== Early life and education ==
Benedict Richard Pierce Macintyre was born on 25 December 1963, in Oxford, the elder son of Angus Donald Macintyre (died 1994), a fellow and tutor in modern history at Magdalen College, Oxford, and Joanna, daughter of Sir Richard Musgrave Harvey, 2nd Baronet, and a descendant of Berkeley Paget. His paternal grandmother was a descendant of James Netterville, 7th Viscount Netterville.

Macintyre was educated at Abingdon School and St John's College, Cambridge, where he graduated with a degree in history in 1985.

== Career ==
=== Books ===
Macintyre is the author of a book on the gentleman criminal Adam Worth, The Napoleon of Crime: The Life and Times of Adam Worth, Master Thief.

He wrote The Man Who Would Be King: The First American in Afghanistan, about Josiah Harlan. This was also published as Josiah the Great: The True Story of the Man who Would be King (2004). Harlan is one of the candidates presumed to be the basis for Rudyard Kipling's short story "The Man Who Would Be King".

He is the author of a book on Eddie Chapman, a double agent of Germany and Britain during World War II, Agent Zigzag: The True Wartime Story of Eddie Chapman: Lover, Betrayer, Hero, Spy.

In 2008, Macintyre wrote an illustrated account of Ian Fleming, creator of the fictional spy James Bond, to accompany the For Your Eyes Only, Ian Fleming and James Bond exhibition at London's Imperial War Museum, which was part of the Fleming Centenary celebrations.

Macintyre's 2010 book Operation Mincemeat first brought Hester Leggatt's possible contributions to Operation Mincemeat to mainstream attention, although the book misspelt her name as "Leggett".

Macintyre's 2020 book Agent Sonya: Moscow's Most Daring Wartime Spy, a biography of Soviet agent Ursula Kuczynski, was featured on BBC Radio 4 as a Book of the Week.

In 2022 his book Colditz: Prisoners of the Castle was released, a history of the German prison and its inhabitants, mostly British POWs. The book received generally favourable reviews.

In 2024, Viking published Macintyre's The Siege about the Iranian Embassy siege in London in 1980. It was announced that the book will be adapted for television by the showrunner of Slow Horses.

=== Other writing ===
Mcintyre has written book reviews for The New York Times.

He is also a columnist for The Times newspaper. His columns range from current affairs to historical controversies.

== Documentaries ==
Five of Macintyre's books have been made into documentaries for the BBC:

- Operation Mincemeat (2010),
- Double Agent: The Eddie Chapman Story (2011),
- Double Cross – The True Story of the D Day Spies (2012)
- Kim Philby: His Most Intimate Betrayal (2014).
- SAS: Rogue Warriors (2017).

== Adaptations ==
In September 2007, Tom Hanks bought the rights to Macintyre's Agent Zigzag. It had not progressed by June 2012.

In 2021, Operation Mincemeat, a cinematic adaptation of Macintyre's 2010's book of the same name, subtitled The True Spy Story that Changed the Course of World War II, premiered at Australia's British Film Festival, and was released to the public in 2022.

Rogue Heroes: The History of the SAS, Britain's Secret Special Forces Unit That Sabotaged the Nazis and Changed the Nature of War, was adapted in 2022 under the title SAS: Rogue Heroes and released on 30 October 2022.

On 8 December 2022, a six-part series titled A Spy Among Friends premiered on the streaming service ITVX. It is an adaptation of Macintyre's book: A Spy Among Friends: Kim Philby and the Great Betrayal. In April 2023 it was announced that the team behind A Spy Among Friends (actor Damian Lewis and director Alexander Cary) is developing further television dramas based on Macintyre books.

== Awards and honours ==
- 1998 Edgar Award shortlist for The Napoleon of Crime
- 1998 Macavity Award shortlist for The Napoleon of Crime
- 2007 Costa Book Awards, Biography, shortlist for Agent Zigzag
- 2008 Galaxy British Book Awards, Biography, shortlist for Agent Zigzag
- 2010 Galaxy British Book Awards, Popular Non-fiction, shortlist for Operation Mincemeat
- 2011 Duke of Westminster's Medal for Military Literature, shortlist for Operation Mincemeat
- 2012 Agatha Award, Non-fiction, shortlist for A Spy Among Friends
- 2013 Edgar Award shortlist for Double Cross
- 2014 Spear's Book Award, winner for A Spy Among Friends
- 2014 Elected fellow of the Royal Society of Literature
- 2018 Baillie Gifford Prize, shortlist for The Spy and the Traitor

== Works ==
- Forgotten Fatherland: The Search for Elisabeth Nietzsche. New York 1992. ISBN 978-0-374-15759-3
- The Napoleon of Crime: The Life and Times of Adam Worth, Master Thief. New York: Farrar, Straus and Giroux, 1997. ISBN 978-0-374-21899-7.
- A Foreign Field: A True Story of Love and Betrayal in the Great War. HarperCollins, 2001. ISBN 978-0-00-257122-7. (American edition: The Englishman's Daughter: A True Story of Love and Betrayal in World War One. New York: Farrar, Straus and Giroux, 2002. ISBN 978-0-374-12985-9.)
- The Man Who Would Be King: The First American in Afghanistan (Josiah Harlan). New York: Farrar, Straus and Giroux, 2004. ISBN 978-0-374-20178-4.
- Agent Zigzag: The True Wartime Story of Eddie Chapman: Lover, Traitor, Hero, Spy. London: Bloomsbury Publishing, 2007. ISBN 978-0-7475-8794-1.
- For Your Eyes Only: Ian Fleming and James Bond. London: Bloomsbury Publishing, 2008.
- The Last Word: Tales from the Tip of the Mother Tongue. London: Bloomsbury Publishing, 2009. ISBN 978-1-4088-0333-2.
- Operation Mincemeat: The True Spy Story that Changed the Course of World War II. London: Bloomsbury Publishing, 2010. ISBN 978-0-7475-9868-8.
- Double Cross: The True Story of the D-Day Spies. London: Bloomsbury Publishing, 2012. ISBN 978-1-4088-1990-6.
- A Spy Among Friends: Kim Philby and the Great Betrayal. London: Bloomsbury Publishing, 2014. ISBN 978-1408851722.
- Rogue Heroes: The History of the SAS, Britain's Secret Special Forces Unit That Sabotaged the Nazis and Changed the Nature of War; McClelland & Stewart; 2017; 400pp; ISBN 978-0771060328
- The Spy and the Traitor: The Greatest Espionage Story of the Cold War (Oleg Gordievsky); Viking, 2018, 352pp; ISBN 978-0241186657
- Agent Sonya: Lover, Mother, Soldier, Spy; Viking, 2020, 384pp; ISBN 978-0241408506
- Colditz: Prisoners of the Castle; Viking, 2022, 384pp; ISBN 978-0241408520
- The Siege: The Remarkable Story of the Greatest SAS Hostage Drama; Viking, 2024, 384pp; ISBN 978-0241675670
- The Faintest of Tickles - a new anthology of cricket writing with a Foreword by Daniel Norcross; Bolzwinick Books, 2025, 262pp; ISBN 979-8334014152
- Redwood: The Untold Story of the Cold War's Most Extraordinary Spy; Viking, 2026, 384pp; ISBN 978-0241754801

== See also ==
- List of Old Abingdonians
- SAS: Rogue Heroes
- A Spy Among Friends
