= Kim Philby =

British intelligence officer and Soviet double agent (1912–1988)

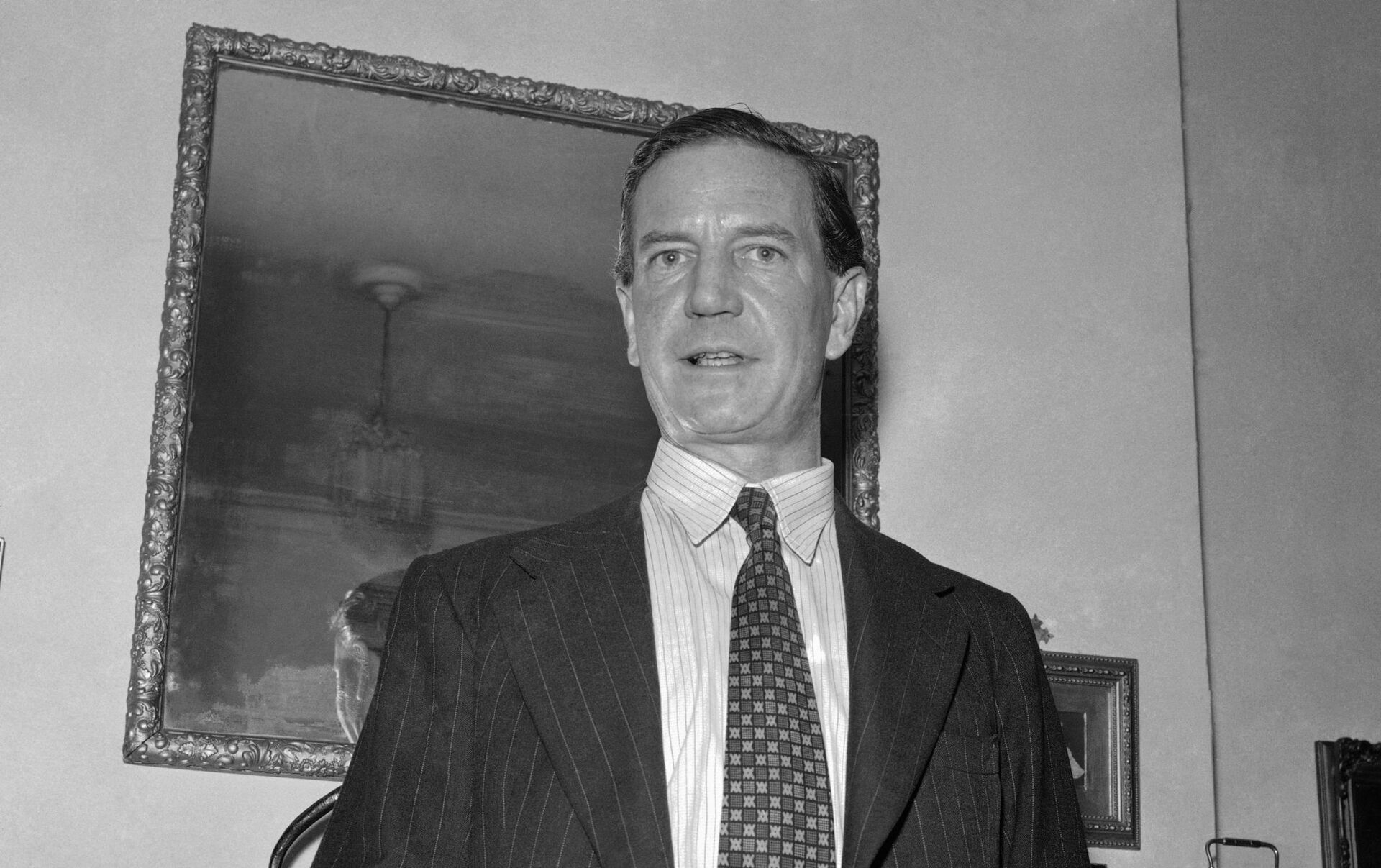
- Philby in 1955
- Born: Harold Adrian Russell Philby; 1 January 1912; Ambala, Punjab, British India
- Died: 11 May 1988 (aged 76); Moscow, Russian SFSR, Soviet Union
- Burial place: Kuntsevo Cemetery
- Education: Trinity College, Cambridge (BA)
- Spouses: Litzi Friedmann (m. 1934; div. 1946); Aileen Furse (m. 1946; died 1957); Eleanor Brewer (m. 1959; div. 1965); Rufina Pukhova (m. 1971)
- Parent: St John Philby
- Awards: Order of Lenin; Order of Friendship of Peoples
- Espionage activity
- Country: United Kingdom
- Allegiance: Soviet Union

Harold Adrian Russell "Kim" Philby (1 January 1912 – 11 May 1988) was a British intelligence officer and a double agent for the Soviet Union. In 1963, he was revealed to be a member of the Cambridge Five, a spy ring that had divulged British secrets to the Soviets during the Second World War and in the early stages of the Cold War. Of the five, Philby is widely considered to have been the most successful in providing secret information to the Soviets.

Born in British India, Philby was educated at Westminster School and Trinity College, Cambridge. He was recruited by Soviet intelligence in 1934, while he was studying at Cambridge. After leaving Cambridge, Philby worked as a journalist, covering the Spanish Civil War and the Battle of France. In 1940, he began working for the United Kingdom's Secret Intelligence Service (SIS or MI6). By the end of the Second World War he had become a high-ranking member.

In 1949, Philby was appointed first secretary to the British Embassy in Washington and served as chief British liaison with American intelligence agencies. During his career as an intelligence officer, he passed large amounts of intelligence to the Soviet Union, including the Albanian Subversion, a scheme to overthrow the pro-Soviet government of Communist Albania.

Philby was suspected of tipping off two other spies under suspicion of Soviet espionage, Donald Maclean and Guy Burgess, both of whom subsequently fled to Moscow in May 1951. Under suspicion himself, Philby resigned from MI6 in July 1951 but was publicly exonerated by then–Foreign Secretary Harold Macmillan in 1955. He resumed his career as both a journalist and a spy for MI6 in Beirut, but was forced to defect to Moscow after finally being unmasked as a Soviet agent in 1963. Philby lived in Moscow until his death in 1988.

== Early life and education ==
Harold Adrian Russell Philby was born on 1 January 1912 in Ambala, Punjab, British India, to author and explorer St John Philby and his wife, Dora Johnston. A member of the Indian Civil Service (ICS) at the time of Philby's birth, St John later became a civil servant in Mesopotamia and advisor to King Ibn Sa'ud of Saudi Arabia.

Nicknamed "Kim" after the boy-spy in Rudyard Kipling's novel Kim, Philby attended Aldro preparatory school, an all-boys school located in Shackleford, Surrey. In his early teens, he spent some time with the Bedouin in the Arabian desert. Following in the footsteps of his father, Philby continued to Westminster School, which he left in 1928 at age 16. He won a scholarship to Trinity College, Cambridge, where he read history and economics. He graduated in 1933 with a 2:1 degree.

At Cambridge, Philby exhibited a "leaning towards communism", in the words of his father, who went on to write: "The only serious question is whether Kim definitely intended to be disloyal to the government while in its service". One of the first things Philby did in Cambridge was join the Cambridge University Socialist Society, attending their meetings but taking little part in their proceedings. However, following the Labour Party's defeat in the 1931 general election, he took a more active role in the society and served as its treasurer in 1932 and 1933.

Upon Philby's graduation, Maurice Dobb, a tutor in economics at Trinity, introduced him to the World Federation for the Relief of the Victims of German Fascism, an organization based in Paris, which attempted to aid victims of Nazi Germany and provide education on oppositions to fascism. The organization was one of several fronts operated by German communist Willi Münzenberg, a member of the Reichstag who had fled to France in 1933.

== Communism and recruitment ==
While working to aid German refugees in Vienna, Philby met Litzi Friedmann (born Alice Kohlmann), a young Austrian communist of Hungarian Jewish origins. Philby admired the strength of her political convictions and later recalled that at their first meeting:

A frank and direct person, Litzi came out and asked me how much money I had. I replied £100, which I hoped would last me about a year in Vienna. She made some calculations and announced, "That will leave you an excess of £25. You can give that to the International Organisation for Aid for Revolutionaries. We need it desperately." I liked her determination.

Philby acted as a courier between Vienna and Prague, paying for the train tickets out of his remaining £75 and using his British passport to evade suspicion. He also delivered clothes and money to refugees. Following the Austrofascist victory in the Austrian Civil War, Philby and Friedmann married in February 1934, enabling her to escape to the United Kingdom with him two months later.

It is possible that it was a Viennese-born friend of Friedmann's in London, Edith Tudor Hart—herself, at this time, a Soviet agent—who first approached Philby about the possibility of working for Soviet intelligence. In early 1934 Arnold Deutsch, another Soviet agent, was sent to University College London under the cover of a research appointment, but in reality had been assigned to recruit the brightest students from Britain's top universities. Philby had come to the Soviets' notice earlier that year in Vienna, where he had been involved in demonstrations against the government of Engelbert Dollfuss. In June 1934, Deutsch recruited Philby to the Soviet intelligence services. Philby later recalled:

Lizzy came home one evening and told me that she had arranged for me to meet a "man of decisive importance". I questioned her about it but she would give me no details. The rendezvous took place in Regents Park. The man described himself as Otto. I discovered much later from a photograph in MI5 files that the name he went by was Arnold Deutsch. I think that he was of Czech origin; about 5 ft 7in, stout, with blue eyes and light curly hair. Though a convinced Communist, he had a strong humanistic streak. He hated London, adored Paris, and spoke of it with deeply loving affection. He was a man of considerable cultural background."

Philby recommended to Deutsch several of his Cambridge contemporaries, including Donald Maclean, who at the time was working in the Foreign Office, as well as Guy Burgess, despite his personal reservations about Burgess' erratic personality.

== Journalism ==
In London, Philby began a career as a journalist. He took a job at a monthly magazine, the World Review of Reviews, for which he wrote a large number of articles and letters (sometimes under a variety of pseudonyms) and occasionally served as "acting editor". Meanwhile, Philby and Friedmann separated. They remained friends for many years following their separation and divorced only in 1946, following the end of the Second World War. When the Germans threatened to overrun Paris in 1940, where she was living at the time, Philby arranged for Friedmann's escape to Britain.

In 1936, Philby began working at a failing trade magazine, the Anglo-Russian Trade Gazette, as editor. After the magazine's owner changed the paper's role to covering Anglo-German trade, Philby engaged in a concerted effort to make contact with Germans such as Joachim von Ribbentrop, at that time the German ambassador in London. He became a member of the Anglo-German Fellowship, an organization aiming at rebuilding and supporting a friendly relationship between Germany and the United Kingdom. The Anglo-German Fellowship, at this time, was supported both by the British and German governments, and Philby made many trips to Berlin.

In February 1937, Philby travelled to Spain, then embroiled in a bloody civil war triggered by the coup d'état of Falangist forces under General Francisco Franco against the government of President Manuel Azaña. Philby worked at first as a freelance journalist; from May 1937, he served as a first-hand correspondent for The Times, reporting from the headquarters of the pro-Franco forces in Seville. He also began working for both the Soviet and British intelligence, which usually consisted of posting letters in a crude code to a fictitious girlfriend, Mlle Dupont in Paris, for the Soviets. He used a simpler system for MI6, delivering post at Hendaye, France, for the British embassy in Paris. When visiting Paris after the war, he was shocked to discover that the address that he used for Mlle Dupont was that of the Soviet embassy. His controller in Paris, a Latvian national named Ozolin-Haskins (code name Pierre), was shot in Moscow in 1937 during Joseph Stalin's Great Purge. His successor, Boris Bazarov, suffered the same fate two years later.

Both the British and the Soviets were interested in analyzing the combat performance of the new Messerschmitt Bf 109 fighter planes and Panzer I and Panzer II tanks deployed with Falangist forces in Spain. Philby told the British, after a direct question to Franco, that German troops would never be permitted to cross Spain to attack Gibraltar. Philby's Soviet controller at the time, Theodore Maly, reported in April 1937 to the NKVD that he had personally briefed Philby on the need "to discover the system of guarding Franco and his entourage". Maly was one of the Soviet Union's most powerful and influential illegal controllers and recruiters. With the goal of potentially arranging Franco's assassination, Philby was instructed to report on vulnerable points in Franco's security and recommend ways to gain access to him and his staff. However, such an act was never a real possibility; upon debriefing Philby in London on 24 May 1937, Maly wrote to the NKVD, "Though devoted and ready to sacrifice himself, [Philby] does not possess the physical courage and other qualities necessary for this [assassination] attempt."

In December 1937, during the Battle of Teruel, a Republican shell hit just in front of the car in which Philby was travelling along with correspondents Edward J. Neil of the Associated Press, Bradish Johnson of Newsweek and Ernest Sheepshanks of Reuters. Johnson was killed outright, and Neil and Sheepshanks soon died of their injuries. Philby suffered only a minor head wound. As a result of this accident, Philby, who was well-liked by the Nationalist forces whose victories he trumpeted, was awarded the Red Cross of Military Merit by Franco on 2 March 1938. Philby found that the award proved helpful in obtaining access to fascist circles:

...there had been a lot of criticism of British journalists from Franco officers who seemed to think that the British in general must be a lot of Communists because so many were fighting with the International Brigades. After I had been wounded and decorated by Franco himself, I became known as 'the English-decorated-by-Franco' and all sorts of doors opened to me.

In 1938, Walter Krivitsky (born Samuel Ginsberg), a former GRU officer in Paris who had defected to France the previous year, travelled to the United States and published an account of his time in "Stalin's secret service". He testified before the Dies Committee (later to become the House Un-American Activities Committee) regarding Soviet espionage within the US. In 1940 he was interviewed by MI5 officers in London, led by Jane Archer. Krivitsky claimed that two Soviet intelligence agents had penetrated the Foreign Office and that a third Soviet intelligence agent had worked as a journalist for a British newspaper in Spain. No connection with Philby was made at the time, and Krivitsky was found shot in a Washington hotel room the following year.

Alexander Orlov (born Lev Feldbin; code-name Swede), Philby's controller in Madrid, who had once met him in France, also defected. To protect his family, still living in the Soviet Union, Orlov said nothing about Philby, an agreement Stalin respected. On a short trip back from Spain, Philby tried to recruit Flora Solomon as a Soviet agent; she was the daughter of a Russian banker and gold dealer, a relative of the Rothschilds and wife of a London stockbroker. At the same time, Burgess was trying to get her into MI6. But the rezident (Russian term for spymaster) in France, probably Pierre at this time, suggested to Moscow that he suspected Philby's motives. Solomon introduced Philby to the woman who would become Philby's second wife, Aileen Furse. Solomon went to work for the British retailer Marks & Spencer.

== British intelligence career ==
=== World War II ===
In July 1939, Philby returned to The Times office in London. When Britain declared war on Nazi Germany in September 1939, Philby's contact with his Soviet controllers was lost and he failed to attend the meetings that were necessary for his work. During the Phoney War from September 1939 until the Dunkirk evacuation, Philby worked as The Times' first-hand correspondent with the British Expeditionary Force headquarters. After being evacuated from Boulogne on 21 May, he returned to France in mid-June and began representing The Daily Telegraph in addition to The Times. He briefly reported from Cherbourg and Brest, sailing for Plymouth less than 24 hours before France surrendered to Germany in June 1940.

In 1940, on the recommendation of Burgess, Philby joined MI6's Section D, a secret organisation charged with investigating how enemies might be attacked through non-military means. Philby and Burgess ran a training course for would-be saboteurs at Brickendonbury Manor in Hertfordshire. His time at Section D, however, was short-lived; the "tiny, ineffective, and slightly comic" section was soon absorbed by the Special Operations Executive (SOE) in the summer of 1940. Burgess was arrested in September for drunken driving and was subsequently fired, while Philby was appointed as an instructor on clandestine propaganda at the SOE's finishing school for agents at the Estate of Lord Montagu in Beaulieu, Hampshire.

Philby's role as an instructor of sabotage agents again brought him to the attention of the Soviet Joint State Political Directorate (OGPU). This role allowed him to conduct sabotage and instruct agents on how to properly conduct sabotage. The new London rezident, Ivan Chichayev (code-name Vadim), re-established contact and asked for a list of British agents being trained to enter the Soviet Union. Philby replied that none had been sent and that none was undergoing training at that time. This statement was underlined twice in red and marked with two question marks, clearly indicating confusion and questioning of this, by disbelieving staff at Moscow Central in the Lubyanka, according to Genrikh Borovik, who saw the telegrams much later in the KGB archives.

Philby provided Stalin with advance warning of Operation Barbarossa and of the Japanese intention to strike into southeast Asia instead of attacking the Soviet Union as Adolf Hitler had urged. The first was ignored as a provocation, but the second, when confirmed by the Russo-German journalist and spy Richard Sorge in Tokyo, contributed to Stalin's decision to begin transporting troops from the Far East in time for the counteroffensive around Moscow.

By September 1941, Philby began working for Section Five of MI6, a section responsible for offensive counter-intelligence. On the strength of his knowledge and experience of Franco's Spain, he was put in charge of the subsection that dealt with Spain and Portugal. This entailed responsibility for a network of undercover operatives in several cities such as Madrid, Gibraltar, Lisbon and Tangier. At this time, the German Abwehr was active in Spain, particularly around the British naval base of Gibraltar, which its agents hoped to watch with many detection stations to track Allied supply ships in the Western Mediterranean. Thanks to British counter-intelligence efforts, of which Philby's Iberian subsection formed a significant part, the project (Abwehr code-name Bodden) never came to fruition.

During 1942–43, Philby's responsibilities were then expanded to include North Africa and Italy, and he was made the deputy head of Section Five under Major Felix Cowgill, an army officer seconded to SIS. In early 1944, as it became clear that the Soviet Union was likely to once more prove a significant adversary to Britain, SIS re-activated Section Nine, which dealt with anti-communist efforts. In late 1944 Philby, on instructions from his Soviet handler, maneuvered through the system successfully to replace Cowgill as head of Section Nine. Charles Arnold-Baker, an officer of German birth (born Wolfgang von Blumenthal) working for Richard Gatty in Belgium and later transferred to the Norwegian/Swedish border, voiced many suspicions of Philby and his intentions but was repeatedly ignored.

While working in Section Five, Philby had become acquainted with James Jesus Angleton, a young American counter-intelligence officer working in liaison with SIS in London. Angleton, later chief of the Central Intelligence Agency's (CIA) Counterintelligence Staff, became suspicious of Philby when he failed to pass on information relating to a British agent executed by the Gestapo in Germany. It later emerged that the agent—known as Schmidt—had also worked as an informant for the Rote Kapelle organisation, which sent information to both London and Moscow. Nevertheless, Angleton's suspicions went unheard.

In late summer 1943, the SIS provided the GRU an official report on the activities of German agents in Bulgaria and Romania, soon to be liberated by the Soviet Union. The NKVD complained to Cecil Barclay, the SIS representative in Moscow, that information had been withheld. Barclay reported the complaint to London. Philby claimed to have overheard discussion of this by chance and sent a report to his controller. This turned out to be identical with Barclay's dispatch, convincing the NKVD that Philby had seen the full Barclay report. A similar lapse occurred with a report from the Japanese embassy in Moscow sent to Tokyo. The NKVD received the same report from Sorge but with an extra paragraph claiming that Hitler might seek a separate peace with the Soviet Union. These lapses by Philby aroused intense suspicion in Moscow.

Elena Modrzhinskaya at GUGB headquarters in Moscow assessed all material from the Cambridge Five. She noted that they produced an extraordinary wealth of information on German war plans but next to nothing on the repeated question of British penetration of Soviet intelligence in either London or Moscow. Philby had repeated his claim that there were no such agents. She asked, "Could the SIS really be such fools they failed to notice suitcase-loads of papers leaving the office? Could they have overlooked Philby's Communist wife?" Modrzhinskaya concluded that all were double agents, working essentially for the British.

A more serious incident occurred in August 1945, when Konstantin Volkov, an NKVD agent and vice-consul in Istanbul, requested political asylum in Britain for himself and his wife. For a large sum of money, Volkov offered the names of three Soviet agents inside Britain, two of whom worked in the Foreign Office and a third who worked in counterintelligence in London. Philby was given the task of dealing with Volkov by British intelligence. He warned the Soviets of the attempted defection and travelled to Istanbul—ostensibly to handle the matter on behalf of SIS but, in reality, to ensure that Volkov had been neutralised. By the time he arrived in Turkey, three weeks later, Volkov had been removed to Moscow.

The intervention of Philby in the affair and the subsequent capture of Volkov by the Soviets might have seriously compromised Philby's position. Volkov's defection had been discussed with the British embassy in Ankara on telephones which turned out to have been tapped by Soviet intelligence. Volkov had insisted that all written communications about him take place by bag rather than by telegraph, causing a delay in reaction that might plausibly have given the Soviets time to uncover his plans. Philby was thus able to evade blame and detection.

A month later Igor Gouzenko, a cipher clerk in Ottawa, took political asylum in Canada and gave the Royal Canadian Mounted Police names of agents operating within the British Empire that were known to him. When Jane Archer (who had interviewed Krivitsky) was appointed to Philby's section he moved her off investigatory work in case she became aware of his past. He later wrote "she had got a tantalising scrap of information about a young English journalist whom the Soviet intelligence had sent to Spain during the Civil War. And here she was plunked down in my midst!"

Years after the war, Sir Hardy Amies, who had served as an intelligence officer, recalled that Philby was in his mess and on being asked what the infamous spy was like, Hardy quipped, "He was always trying to get information out of me—most significantly the name of my tailor". Philby, "employed in a Department of the Foreign Office", was appointed an Officer of the Order of the British Empire (OBE) in 1946.

Of the five spies known as the Cambridge Five, Philby is widely considered to have been the most successful in providing secret information to the Soviets.

=== Istanbul ===
In February 1947, Philby was appointed head of British intelligence for Turkey and posted to Istanbul with his second wife, Aileen, and their family. His public position was that of First Secretary at the British Consulate; in reality, his intelligence work required overseeing British agents and working with the Turkish National Security Service.

Philby planned to infiltrate five or six groups of émigrés into Soviet Armenia or Soviet Georgia, but efforts among the expatriate community in Paris produced just two recruits. Turkish intelligence took them to a border crossing into Georgia but soon afterwards shots were heard. Another effort was made using a Turkish gulet for a seaborne landing, but it never left port. Philby was implicated in a similar campaign in Communist Albania. Colonel David Smiley, an aristocratic Guards officer who had helped Enver Hoxha and his communist guerillas to liberate Albania, now prepared to remove Hoxha. He trained Albanian commandos—some of whom were former Nazi collaborators—in Libya or Malta. From 1947, they infiltrated the southern mountains to build support for former King Zog.

The first three missions, overland from Greece, were trouble-free. Larger numbers were landed by sea and air under Operation Valuable, which continued until 1951, increasingly under the influence of the newly formed CIA. Stewart Menzies, head of SIS, disliked the idea, which was promoted by former SOE men now in SIS. Most infiltrators were caught by the Sigurimi, the Albanian Security Service. Clearly there had been leaks and Philby was later suspected as one of the leakers. His own comment was, "I do not say that people were happy under the regime but the CIA underestimated the degree of control that the Authorities had over the country." Philby later wrote of his attitude towards the operation in Albania:

The agents we sent into Albania were armed men intent on murder, sabotage and assassination ... They knew the risks they were running. I was serving the interests of the Soviet Union and those interests required that these men were defeated. To the extent that I helped defeat them, even if it caused their deaths, I have no regrets.

Philby's wife had suffered from psychological problems since childhood which caused her to inflict injuries upon herself. In 1948, troubled by Philby's heavy drinking and frequent depressions and his life in Istanbul, she experienced a breakdown, staging an accident and injecting herself with urine and insulin to cause skin disfigurations. She was sent to a clinic in Switzerland to recover. Upon her return to Istanbul in late 1948, she was badly burned in an incident with a charcoal stove and returned to Switzerland. Shortly afterward, Philby was moved to the job as chief SIS representative in Washington, with his family.

=== Washington, D.C. ===
In September 1949, the Philbys arrived in the United States. Officially, his post was that of First Secretary to the British Embassy; in reality, he served as chief British intelligence representative in Washington. His office oversaw a large amount of urgent and top secret communications between Washington and London. Philby was also responsible for liaising with the CIA and promoting "more aggressive Anglo-American intelligence operations". A leading figure within the CIA was Philby's wary former colleague, James Jesus Angleton, with whom he once again found himself working closely. Angleton remained suspicious of Philby but lunched with him every week in Washington.

A more serious threat to Philby's position had come to light. During the summer of 1945, a Soviet cipher clerk had reused a one-time pad to transmit intelligence traffic. This mistake made it possible to break the normally impregnable code. Contained in the traffic (intercepted and decrypted as part of the Venona project) was information that documents had been sent to Moscow from the British embassy in Washington. The intercepted messages revealed that the embassy source (identified as "Homer") travelled to New York City to meet his Soviet contact twice a week. Philby had been briefed on the situation shortly before reaching Washington in 1949; it was clear to Philby that the agent was Maclean, who worked in the embassy at the time and whose wife, Melinda, lived in New York. Philby had to help discover the identity of "Homer", but also wished to protect Maclean.

In January 1950, on evidence provided by the Venona intercepts, Soviet atomic spy Klaus Fuchs was arrested. His arrest led to others: Harry Gold, a courier with whom Fuchs had worked, David Greenglass, and Julius and Ethel Rosenberg. The investigation into the embassy leak continued and the stress of it was exacerbated by the arrival in Washington, in October 1950, of Burgess—Philby's unstable and dangerously alcoholic fellow spy.

Burgess, who had been given a post as Second Secretary at the British Embassy, took up residence in the Philby family home and rapidly set about causing offence to all and sundry. Philby's wife resented him and disliked his presence; Americans were offended by his "natural superciliousness" and "utter contempt for the whole pyramid of values, attitudes, and courtesies of the American way of life". J. Edgar Hoover complained that Burgess used British embassy automobiles to avoid arrest when he cruised Washington in pursuit of homosexual encounters. His dissolution had a troubling effect on Philby; the morning after a particularly disastrous and drunken party, a guest returning to collect his car heard voices upstairs and found "Kim and Guy in the bedroom drinking champagne. They had already been down to the Embassy but being unable to work had come back".

Burgess' presence was awkward for Philby, yet it was potentially dangerous for Philby to leave him unsupervised. The situation in Washington was tense. From April 1950, Maclean had been the prime suspect in the investigation into the embassy leak. Philby had undertaken to devise an escape plan that would warn Maclean, in England, of the intense suspicion he was under and arrange for him to flee. Burgess had to get to London to warn Maclean, who was under surveillance. In early May 1951, Burgess got three speeding tickets in a single day—then pleaded diplomatic immunity, causing an official complaint to be made to the British ambassador. Burgess was sent back to England, where he met Maclean in his London club.

The SIS planned to interrogate Maclean on 28 May 1951. On 23 May, concerned that Maclean had not yet fled, Philby wired Burgess, ostensibly about his Lincoln convertible that had been abandoned in the embassy car park. "If he did not act at once it would be too late", the telegram read, "because [Philby] would send his car to the scrap heap. There was nothing more [he] could do." On 25 May, Burgess drove Maclean from his home at Tatsfield, Surrey, to Southampton, where both boarded the steamship Falaise to France and then proceeded to Moscow.

=== Public denials ===
Burgess had intended to aid Maclean in his escape, not accompany him in it. The "affair of the missing diplomats", as it was referred to before Burgess and Maclean surfaced in Moscow, attracted a great deal of public attention, and Burgess' disappearance, which identified him as complicit in Maclean's espionage, deeply compromised Philby's position. Under a cloud of suspicion raised by his highly visible and intimate association with Burgess, Philby returned to London. There, he underwent MI5 interrogation aimed at ascertaining whether he had acted as a "third man" in Burgess and Maclean's spy ring. In July 1951, Philby resigned from MI6, preempting his all-but-inevitable dismissal.

Even after his departure from MI6, suspicion towards Philby continued. Interrogated repeatedly regarding his intelligence work and his connection with Burgess, he continued to deny that he had acted as a Soviet agent. From 1952, Philby struggled to find work as a journalist, eventually—in August 1954—accepting a position with a diplomatic newsletter called the Fleet Street Letter. Lacking access to material of value and out of touch with Soviet intelligence, he all but ceased to operate as a Soviet agent.

On 25 October 1955, following revelations in The New York Times, Labour MP Marcus Lipton used parliamentary privilege to ask Prime Minister Anthony Eden if he was determined "to cover up at all costs the dubious third man activities of Mr Harold Philby..." This was reported in the British press, leading Philby to threaten legal action against Lipton if he repeated his accusations outside Parliament. Lipton later withdrew his comments. This retraction came about when Philby was officially cleared by Foreign Secretary Harold Macmillan on 7 November. The minister told the House of Commons, "I have no reason to conclude that Mr. Philby has at any time betrayed the interests of his country, or to identify him with the so-called 'Third Man', if indeed there was one." Following this, Philby gave a press conference in his mother's London flat in which—calmly, confidently, and without the stammer he had struggled with since childhood—he reiterated his innocence, declaring, "I have never been a communist."

== Return to journalism ==
After being exonerated, Philby was no longer employed by MI6 and Soviet intelligence lost all contact with him. In August 1956 he was sent to Beirut as a Middle East correspondent for The Observer and The Economist. There, his journalism served as cover for renewed work for MI6. He wrote under his own name and under the pen name "Charles Garner" when writing about subjects he considered too "fluffy"(distasteful), for example the subject of Arab slave girls.

In Lebanon, Philby at first lived in Mahalla Jamil, his father's large household located in the village of Ajaltoun, just outside Beirut. Following the departure of his father and stepbrothers for Saudi Arabia, he continued to live alone in Ajaltoun, but took a flat in Beirut after beginning an affair with Eleanor Brewer, the wife of New York Times correspondent Sam Pope Brewer. Following the death of his second wife in 1957 and Eleanor's subsequent divorce from Brewer, the two were married in London in 1959 and set up house together in Beirut. From 1960, Philby's formerly marginal work as a journalist became more substantial and he frequently travelled throughout the Middle East, including Saudi Arabia, Egypt, Jordan, Kuwait and Yemen.

== Defection to Russia ==
In 1961, Anatoliy Golitsyn, a major in the First Chief Directorate of the KGB, defected to the United States from his diplomatic post in Helsinki. Golitsyn offered the CIA revelations of Soviet agents within American and British intelligence services. Following his debriefing in the US, Golitsyn was sent to SIS for further questioning. The head of MI6, Dick White, only recently transferred from MI5, had suspected Philby as the "third man". Golitsyn proceeded to confirm White's suspicions about Philby's role. Nicholas Elliott, an MI6 officer recently stationed in Beirut who was a friend of Philby's and had previously believed in his innocence, was tasked with attempting to secure his full confession.

It is unclear whether Philby had been alerted, but Eleanor noted that as 1962 wore on, expressions of tension in his life "became worse and were reflected in bouts of deep depression and drinking". She recalled returning home to Beirut from a sight-seeing trip in Jordan to find Philby "hopelessly drunk and incoherent with grief on the terrace of the flat", mourning the death of a little pet fox that had fallen from the balcony. When Elliott met Philby in late 1962, the first time since Golitsyn's defection, he found Philby too drunk to stand and with a bandaged head; he had fallen repeatedly and cracked his skull on a bathroom radiator, requiring stitches.

Philby told Elliott that he was "half expecting" to see him. Elliott confronted him, saying, "I once looked up to you, Kim. My God, how I despise you now. I hope you've enough decency left to understand why." Prompted by Elliott's accusations, Philby confirmed the charges of espionage and described his intelligence activities on behalf of the Soviets. However, when Elliott asked him to sign a written statement, he hesitated and requested a delay in the interrogation. Another meeting was scheduled to take place in the last week of January. It has since been suggested that the whole confrontation with Elliott had been a charade to convince the KGB that Philby had to be brought back to Moscow, where he could serve as a British penetration agent of Moscow Central.

On the evening of 23 January 1963, Philby vanished from Beirut, failing to meet his wife for a dinner party at the home of Glencairn Balfour Paul, First Secretary at the British Embassy: Paul and his wife Marnie had a close friendship with the Philbys. The Dolmatova, a Soviet freighter bound for Odessa, had left Beirut that morning so abruptly that cargo was left scattered over the docks; Philby claimed that he left Beirut on board this ship, a claim backed by Balfour Paul. The defection of Philby, given their close friendship, was to cause Balfour Paul - as a prominent diplomat - considerable discomfort, not least when Philby published a list of 'British spies in the Middle East' in Pravda with Balfour Paul's name at the top. Balfour Paul considered this a joke on Philby's part, and 'a singularly bad one'. Balfour Paul himself noted that Philby had likely been apprised of British suspicions of his role as a double agent by 'Fourth Man' Anthony Blunt, who had travelled to Beirut in December 1962 ostensibly in search of a rare frog orchid.

Balfour Paul was to remember Philby as, '...an unforgiveable traitor to his country, responsible among much else for the assassination by his Soviet associates of many brave men. All that I can say is that in the half of him I knew (the most deceitful half, of course) he was a most enjoyable friend.' Balfour Paul also noted that he had never once seen Philby drunk, despite his reputation during his time in Lebanon as being a frequent and hard drinker. That view of Philby was not shared by Balfour Paul's contemporary, Alan Munro who recalled Philby and Eleanor kept '...a hospitable establishment in the Rue Kantara and are rarely to be found sober.'

It was not until 1 July 1963 that Philby's flight to Moscow was officially confirmed. On 30 July, Soviet officials announced that they had granted him political asylum in the Soviet Union, along with Soviet citizenship. When the news broke, MI6 came under criticism for failing to anticipate and block Philby's defection, though Elliott was to claim he could not have prevented Philby's flight. Journalist Ben Macintyre, author of several works on espionage, speculated that MI6 might have left open the opportunity for Philby to flee to Moscow to avoid an embarrassing public trial. Philby himself thought this might have been the case.

=== Moscow ===
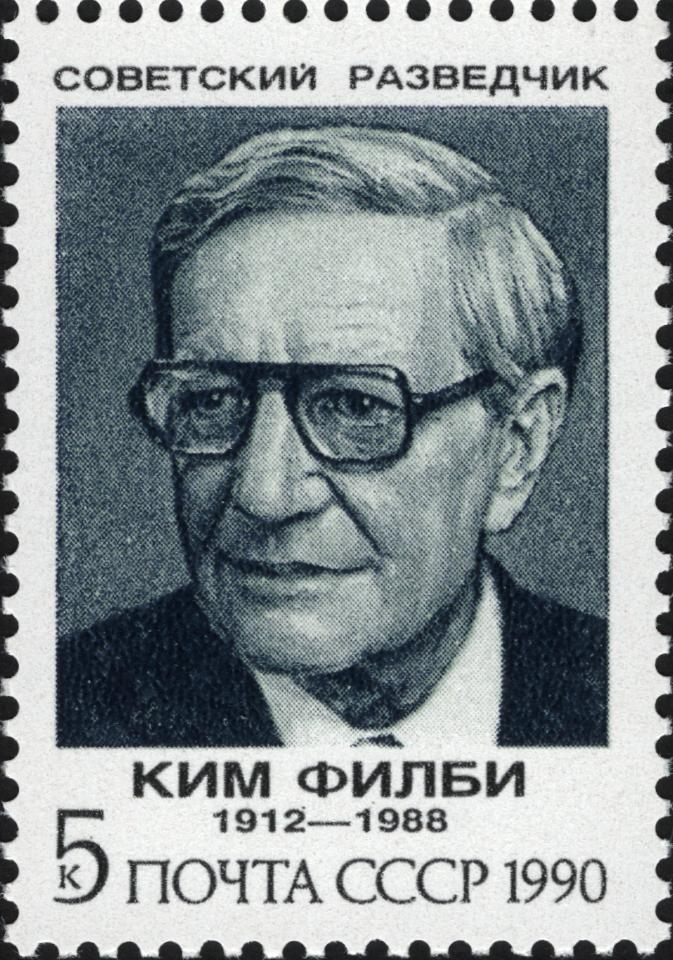
Philby on a 1990 Soviet stamp (Note: Part of a set of five, the other four showing the spies Stanislav Vaupshasov, Rudolf Abel, Ivan Kudrya and Konon Molody.)

Upon his arrival in Moscow in January 1963, Philby discovered that he was not a colonel in the KGB, as he had been led to believe. He was paid 500 roubles a month (the average Soviet salary in 1960 was Rbls 80.60 a month and Rbls 122 in 1970) and his family was not immediately able to join him in exile. Philby was under virtual house arrest and under guard, with all visitors screened by the KGB. It was ten years before he was given a minor role in the training of KGB recruits. Mikhail Lyubimov, his closest KGB contact, explained that this was to guard his safety, but later admitted that the real reason was the KGB's fear that Philby would return to London.

Secret files released to the National Archives in late 2020 indicated that the British government had intentionally conducted a campaign to keep Philby's spying confidential "to minimise political embarrassment" and prevent the publication of his memoirs, according to a report by The Guardian. Nonetheless, the information was publicized in 1967 when he granted an interview to Murray Sayle of The Times in Moscow. Philby confirmed that he had worked for the KGB and that "his purpose in life was to destroy imperialism".

In Moscow, Philby occupied himself by writing his memoirs, which were published in Britain in 1968 under the title My Silent War; they were not published in the Soviet Union until 1980. In the book, Philby says that his loyalties were always with the communists; he considered himself not to have been a double agent but "a straight penetration agent working in the Soviet interest". Philby continued to read The Times, which was not generally available in the USSR, listened to the BBC World Service and was an avid follower of cricket.

Philby's award of the Order of the British Empire was cancelled and annulled in 1965. Though he claimed publicly in January 1988 that he did not regret his decisions and that he missed nothing about England except some friends, Colman's mustard and Lea & Perrins Worcestershire sauce, his fourth wife, Rufina Ivanovna Pukhova, later described Philby as "disappointed in many ways" by what he found in Moscow. "He saw people suffering too much", but he consoled himself by arguing that "the ideals were right but the way they were carried out was wrong. The fault lay with the people in charge." Pukhova said, "he was struck by disappointment, brought to tears. He said, 'Why do old people live so badly here? After all, they won the war.'" Philby's drinking and depression continued; according to Rufina, he had attempted suicide by slashing his wrists sometime in the 1960s.

Philby found work in the early 1970s in the KGB's Active Measures Department churning out fabricated documents. Working from genuine unclassified and public CIA or US State Department documents, Philby inserted "sinister" paragraphs regarding US plans. The KGB would stamp the documents "top secret" and begin their circulation. For the Soviets, Philby was an invaluable asset, ensuring the correct use of idiomatic and diplomatic English phrases in their disinformation efforts.

== Personal life ==
In February 1934, Philby married Litzi Friedmann, an Austrian Jewish communist whom he had met in Vienna. They subsequently moved to Britain; however, they later separated. Litzi lived in Paris before returning to London for the duration of the war; she ultimately settled in East Germany.

While working as a correspondent in Spain, Philby began an affair with Frances Doble, Lady Lindsay-Hogg, an actress and aristocratic divorcée who was an admirer of Franco and Hitler. They travelled together in Spain through August 1939.

In 1940, Philby began living with Aileen Furse in London. Their first three children, Josephine, John and Tommy, were born between 1941 and 1944. In 1946, Philby arranged a divorce from Litzi. He and Aileen were married on 25 September 1946, while Aileen was pregnant with their fourth child, Miranda. Their fifth child, Harry George, was born in 1950. Aileen suffered from psychiatric problems, which grew more severe during the period of poverty and suspicion following the flight of Burgess and Maclean. She lived separately from Philby, settling with their children in Crowborough while he lived first in London and later in Beirut. Weakened by alcoholism and frequent illness, she died of influenza in December 1957. Through his son John, Philby's granddaughter is the author Charlotte Philby.

In 1956, Philby began an affair with Eleanor Brewer, the wife of New York Times correspondent Sam Pope Brewer. Following Eleanor's divorce, the couple married in January 1959. After Philby defected in 1963, Eleanor visited him in Moscow. In November 1964, after a visit to the US, she returned, intending to settle permanently. In her absence, Philby had begun an affair with Donald Maclean's wife, Melinda. He and Eleanor divorced and she departed Moscow in May 1965. Melinda left Maclean and briefly lived with Philby in Moscow. In 1968, she returned to Maclean.

In 1971, Philby married Rufina Pukhova, a 39-year-old Russo-Polish woman, with whom he lived until his death on 11 May 1988, aged 76, in Moscow.

== Death ==
Philby died in a Moscow hospital on 11 May 1988 of heart failure. Rumours of suicide were based purely on a famous line of his, "A true secret agent only shoots [a gun] once in his life - when he has no other way out." He was "buried with the honours of a KGB General" in Kuntsevo Cemetery, Ryabinovaya Ulitsa, Moscow.

Rufina Ivanovna Pukhova, his fourth wife, told a reporter that Philby was "disillusioned with Communism by the end of his life, tortured by his failings, and drank himself to death." She did dismiss the rumours that he had actively committed suicide, however, and insisted that he had ultimately died of a heart condition, telling Helen Womack of The Independent, "The suicide story is rubbish, to put it mildly".

=== Posthumous awards ===
The USSR posthumously awarded numerous Soviet medals to Philby:

- Order of Lenin
- Order of the Red Banner
- Order of Friendship of Peoples
- Order of the Great Patriotic War (First class)
- Jubilee Medal "Forty Years of Victory in the Great Patriotic War 1941–1945"

== Motivation ==
In a 1981 videoed lecture to Stasi agents, the East German intelligence agency, Philby attributed the failure of British intelligence to unmask him as due in great part to these things: the British class system—it was inconceivable that one "born into the ruling class of the British Empire" would be a traitor; the amateurish and incompetent nature of the British organisation; and because so many in MI6 had so much to lose if he was proven to be a spy. He had the policy of never confessing; a document in his own handwriting was dismissed as a forgery.

Philby said that at the time of his recruitment as a spy there were no prospects of him being useful; he was instructed to make his way into the Secret Service, which took years, starting with journalism and building up contacts in the British establishment. He said that there was no discipline there; he made friends with the archivist, which enabled him for years to take secret documents home, many unrelated to his own work, and bring them back the next day; his handler photographed them overnight.

When he was instructed to remove and replace his boss, Felix Cowgill, he asked if it was proposed "to shoot him or something" but was told to use bureaucratic intrigue. He said: "It was a very dirty story—but after all our work does imply getting dirty hands from time to time but we do it for a cause that is not dirty in any way." Commenting on his sabotage of the operation to secretly send thousands of anti-communists into Albania to overthrow the communist government, Philby defended his actions by saying that he had helped prevent another world war.

== Fictional and non-fictional representations ==
Kim Philby has been the subject of several books, films and television series, including A Spy Among Friends (2022) and Kim Philby: His Most Intimate Betrayal (2014). Philby's granddaughter Charlotte Philby wrote her fourth novel Edith and Kim (2022) about her grandfather.

Philby is a main character in Frederick Forsyth's 1984 novel The Fourth Protocol, and a lesser role in the 1987 film based on the novel. He is the initial instigator and later patron of the plan to smuggle parts of an atomic bomb into the UK.

Philby is a character in Kate Westbrook's "The Moneypenny Diaries," a three-novel series that explores the life and secret activities of Jane Moneypenny, Secretary to 'M' in the earlier James Bond movies.

The novel Declare by Tim Powers is a work of speculative fiction portraying the actual events in the lives of both Philby and his father, St. John Philby, as being motivated by supernatural powers centred around Mount Ararat.

Irish blues guitarist Rory Gallagher has a song, Philby, on his Top Priority (1979) record.

He is portrayed by Toby Stephens in Cambridge Spies, a four-part British drama series.

== Bibliography ==
- Andrew, Christopher (2009). The Defence of the Realm: The Authorized History of MI5. London: Allen Lane. ISBN 978-0-7139-9885-6.
- Borovik, Genrikh; Knightley, Phillip (1994). The Philby files: the secret life of master spy Kim Philby. London: Little, Brown and Company. ISBN 978-0-316-91015-6.
- Boyle, Andrew (1979). The Fourth Man: The Definitive Account of Kim Philby, Guy Burgess and Donald Maclean and Who Recruited Them to Spy for Russia'. New York: The Dial Press/James Wade. ISBN 978-0-8037-2321-4.
- Brown, Anthony Cave (1994). Treason in the Blood: H. St. John Philby, Kim Philby, and the Spy Case of the Century. Boston: Houghton Mifflin. ISBN 978-0-395-63119-5.
- Burton, Alan (2018). Looking-glass wars: spies on British screens since 1960. Wilmington, Delaware. ISBN 978-1-62273-290-6.
- Fisher, John (1977). Burgess and Maclean: a new look at the Foreign Office spies. London: Robert Hale. ISBN 978-0-7091-6479-1.
- Hamrick, S. J. (2004). Deceiving the deceivers: Kim Philby, Donald Maclean and Guy Burgess. New Haven, Connecticut: Yale University Press. ISBN 978-0-300-10416-5.
- Hickman, Clayton; Barnes, Alan (2005). Endgame: collected comic strips from the pages of Doctor Who magazine. Tunbridge Wells, England: Panini Books. ISBN 978-1-905239-09-2.
- Holzman, Michael (2013). Guy Burgess: Revolutionary in an Old School Tie. New York: Chelmsford Press. ISBN 978-0-615-89509-3.
- Koch, Stephen (2004). Double lives: Stalin, Willi Münzenberg, and the seduction of the intellectuals (Revised ed.). New York: Enigma Books. ISBN 978-1-929631-20-9.
- Lett, Brian (2016). SOE's Mastermind: the Authorised Biography of Major General Sir Colin Gubbins KCMG, DSO, MC. Pen and Sword. ISBN 978-1-4738-6382-8 – via Google Books.
- Lownie, Andrew (2016). Stalin's Englishman: The Lives of Guy Burgess. London: Hodder and Stoughton. ISBN 978-1-473-62738-3.
- Macintyre, Ben (2015). A Spy Among Friends: Philby and the Great Betrayal. London: Bloomsbury Publishing. ISBN 978-1-4088-5178-4.
- Le Carré, John (2004). Conversations with John Le Carré. Jackson, Mississippi: University Press of Mississippi. ISBN 978-1-57806-669-8.
- Page, Bruce; Leitch, David (1968). Knightley, Phillip (ed.). Philby: The Spy Who Betrayed a Generation. London: Andre Deutsch Ltd. ISBN 978-0-233-96014-2.
- Philby, Rufina; Lyubimov, Mikhail; Peake, Hayden (1999). The Private Life of Kim Philby: the Moscow Years. London: St Ermin's. ISBN 978-0-9536151-6-2.
- Purvis, Stewart; Hulbert, Jeff (2016). Guy Burgess: The Spy Who Knew Everyone. London: Biteback Publishing. ISBN 978-1-84954-913-4.
- Richelson, Jeffrey T. (1997). A Century of Spies: Intelligence in the Twentieth Century. Oxford: Oxford University Press. ISBN 978-0-19-511390-7.
- Riley, Morris (1990). Philby: The Hidden Years. Penzance: United Writers' Publications. ISBN 978-1-85200-029-5.
- Seale, Patrick; McConnville, Maureen (1973). Philby: The Long Road to Moscow. New York: Simon & Schuster. ISBN 978-0-671-21509-5.
- Smiley, David (1985). Albanian Assignment. London: Chatto & Windus. ISBN 978-0-7011-2869-2.)
- Wallace, Robert; Melton, H. Keith; Schlesinger, Henry R. (2009). Spycraft: The Secret History of the CIA's Spytechs, from Communism to Al-Qaeda. London: Bantam. ISBN 978-0-593-06204-3.
- Yergin, Daniel (1991). The Prize: the Epic Quest for Oil, Money & Power. New York: Touchstone. ISBN 978-0-671-79932-8.
