= Meeropol =

Meeropol is a surname. Notable people with the surname include:

- Abel Meeropol (1903–1986), American songwriter and poet whose works were published under his pseudonym, Lewis Allan
- Ivy Meeropol (born 1968), documentary film director and producer. Daughter of Michael Meeropol and granddaughter of Julius and Ethel Rosenberg
- Michael Meeropol (born Michael Rosenberg, 1943), American professor of economics. Older son of Julius and Ethel Rosenberg
- Robert Meeropol (born Robert Rosenberg, 1947), American writer. Younger son of Ethel and Julius Rosenberg
