= Defence Committee =

Defence Committee or Defense Committee may refer to:

== Government ==
- Canadian House of Commons Standing Committee on National Defence
- Canadian Senate Standing Committee on National Security and Defence
- Committee on Defence (Sweden)
- Defence Committee (Australia)
- Defense Committee (Soviet Union)
- Defence Committee of the Cabinet (Pakistan)
- Defence Select Committee, UK
- Foreign Affairs and Defense Committee, Israel
- International Relations and Defence Committee, UK
- National Defence and Armed Forces Committee, France
- Standing Committee on Defence (India)
- State Defense Committee in the Soviet Union

== Militias ==
- Defense Committees, in Spanish Civil War

== Solidarity campaigns ==
- Black Action Defence Committee, Canada
- INA Defence Committee, India
- Lawyers Military Defense Committee, USA
- Leonard Peltier Defense Committee
- National Rosenberg Defence Committee, UK
- Partisan Defense Committee, USA
- Workers' Defence Committee, Poland

== See also ==
- Committee on Military Affairs (disambiguation)
- Committee for the Defense of the Revolution (disambiguation)
