= Western New England University School of Law =

Private law school in Springfield, Massachusetts, US

Coordinates: 42.113°N 72.522°W

- Established: 1919; 107 years ago
- School type: Private
- Parent endowment: $60.2 million (2024)
- Dean: Zelda Harris
- Location: Springfield, Massachusetts, U.S.
- Enrollment: 308
- Faculty: 41 (full-time)
- Website: wne.edu/law

Western New England University School of Law is the ABA-accredited law school of Western New England University, a private university in Springfield, Massachusetts. Established in 1919, the law school offers both full-time and part-time programs.

== History ==
S. Prestley Blake Law Center

Western New England College was established in 1919 as a branch of Northeastern University (then Northeastern College) and began offering evening law classes. In 1923, the first seven law graduates were recognized. In 1951, Western New England College received an independent charter and ended its affiliation with Northeastern. The full-time law program began in 1973. The law school has approximately 8,000 alumni. The S. Prestley Blake Law Center was first opened in 1978 at a cost of $3.4 million. The building is named after S. Prestley Blake, who made a substantial gift of $250,000 to the project. The law school underwent major renovations in 2007, including a new wing, lobby, and entrance. The project also saw the reconfiguration of several classrooms, creating smaller and more intimate learning environments.

On July 1, 2011, Western New England College School of Law officially became Western New England University School of Law. The Massachusetts Board of Higher Education approved the change in March 2011.

== Admissions ==
For the class entering in 2025, the law school accepted 452 out of 871 applicants (a 51.89% acceptance rate) with 112 of those accepted enrolling, a 24.78% yield rate (the percentage of accepted students who enrolled). Three students were not included in the acceptance statistics. The class consists of 115 students. The median LSAT score of enrolled students was 153 and the median undergraduate GPA was 3.27. Three students were not included in the GPA calculation and five were not included in the LSAT calculation as the five were JD-Next alternative to the LSAT admissions. The reported 25th/75th percentile LSAT scores and GPAs were 149/156 and 2.84/3.57.

== Programs ==
The primary aim of the law school is its J.D. program. The school also offers a part-time day or evening program. In addition, the law school has the following six joint-degree programs: J.D./M.B.A., J.D./M.S.A., and J.D./M.S.O.L. with the Western New England University College of Business; J.D./M.S.E.M. with the Western New England University College of Engineering; J.D./M.S.W. with Springfield College; and a J.D./M.R.P. with the University of Massachusetts Amherst. Undergraduates of certain undergraduate institutions can take advantage of the "3+3 program," which allows certain students to complete a B.A. and a J.D. in six years.

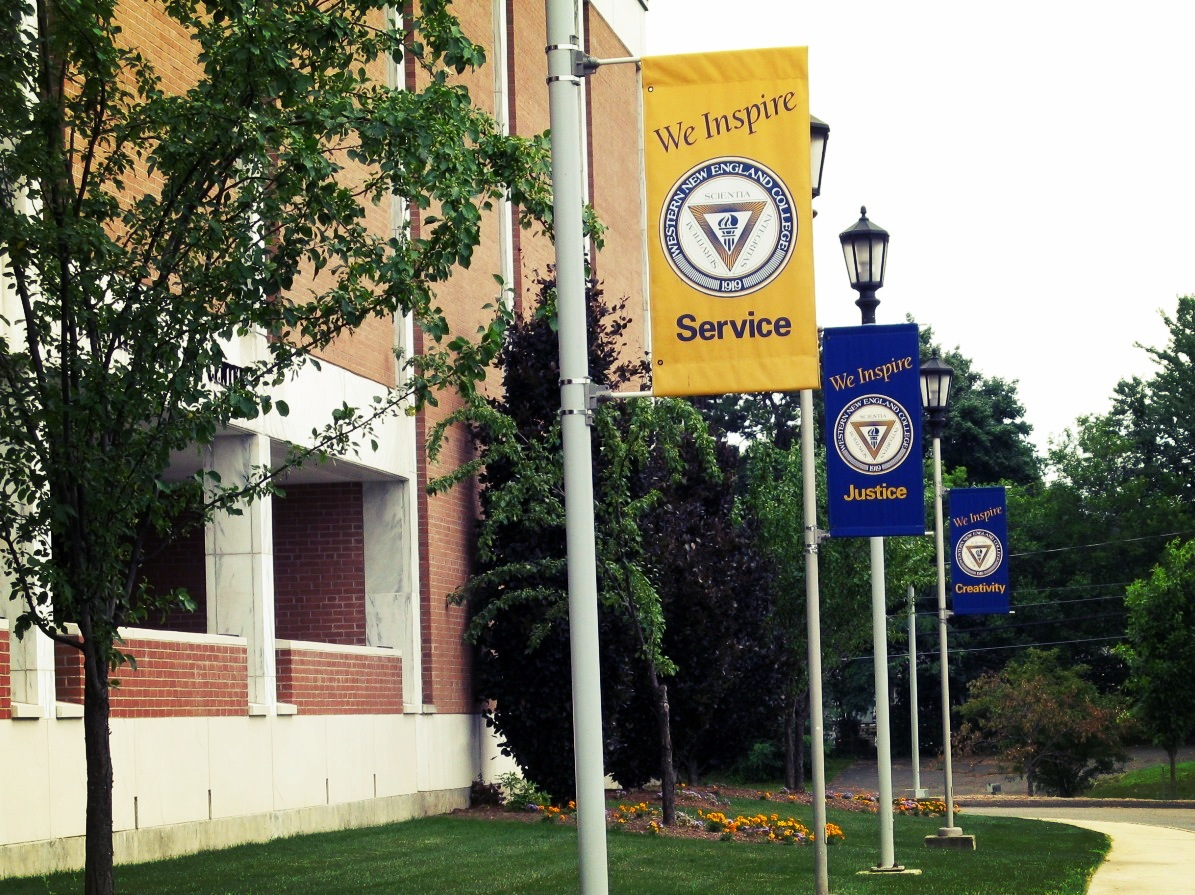
Western New England University School of Law

=== Concentrations ===
J.D. students have the option to concentrate in the following fields: Criminal Law Practice, Gender & Sexuality Law, International and Comparative Law Practice, Public Interest Practice, and Transactional Law Practice.

=== Clinics and Externships ===
The law school offers numerous clinical opportunities, where students can gain practical knowledge and develop professional skills under the supervision of experienced practitioners. The following clinics are currently offered: Criminal Law Defense Practicum, Criminal Law Prosecution Practicum, Family Defense Practicum, Family Mediation Clinic, Global Justice Clinic, Innocence Clinic, Legal Aid Clinic, Real Estate Practicum, Small Business Clinic. Students also have the opportunity to gain practical legal experience for academic credit through offered or student-secured externships.

The university's Center for Innovation & Entrepreneurship also offers a resource for small business development in the greater Pioneer Valley region. The Small Business Clinic is the cornerstone program of the Center. The Clinic pairs students from the School of Law and College of Business to offer personal, professional legal assistance to entrepreneurs in the business start-up stage.

=== LL.M. programs ===
The law school offers a live, interactive online program in Elder Law and Estate Planning.

=== The Center for Social Justice ===
The Center for Social Justice was founded in 2019 with the stated mission to advance justice through research, education, advocacy, innovation, and public engagement to understand and address root causes of systemic social injustice and develop solutions for change. Through pro bono representation, the school assists marginalized, underserved, BIPOC, low-income, women, LGBTQ+, and immigrant communities in the local region.

== Western New England Law Review ==
The Western New England Law Review publishes three issues per year. The editorial board consists of members of the School of Law who rank at or near the top 10 percent of their first-year class. The Law Review also permits a certain number of candidates based on the recommendation of their Legal Research and Writing professor at the end of their first year.

== Employment ==
ABA Employment Summary for 2022 Graduates
Employment Status	Percentage
Employed - Bar Passage Required	62.0%
Employed - J.D. Advantage	12.7%
Employed - Professional Position	1.3%
Employed - Other Position	1.3%
Employed - Start Date Deferred	1.3%
Unemployed - Not Seeking	1.3%
Unemployed - Seeking	8.9%
Employment Status Unknown	6.3%
Total of 79 Graduates

According to Western New England Law's official ABA-required disclosures, 62.0% of the Class of 2022 obtained full-time, long-term, bar passage-required employment nine months after graduation, excluding solo-practitioners. Most employment was in firms of 1 - 10 attorneys or government. The main employment destinations for Western New England Law graduates are Connecticut, Massachusetts, and New York.

== Costs ==
For the 2023-2024 academic year, tuition was $47,450 for the full-time program and $31,540 for the part-time program. Estimated total annual cost, including fees and living expenses, is $70,000.

== Rankings ==
The Western New England University School of Law is ranked no. 159 in the U.S. News & World Report Best Law Schools.

== Notable alumni ==
- Stephen Buoniconti '95 - Former member of the Massachusetts Senate (served 2005–2011) and former member of the Massachusetts House of Representatives (served 2001–2004).
- Lawrence F. Cafero '81 - Former member of Connecticut House of Representatives and Republican House Leader (served 1992–2015).
- Gale D. Candaras '82 - Former member of the Massachusetts Senate (served 2006–2014) and former member of the Massachusetts House of Representatives (served 1996 - 2006).
- Michael A. Christ '02 - Former Deputy Majority Leader of Connecticut House of Representatives.
- Cheryl A. Coakley-Rivera '95, Former member of the Massachusetts House of Representatives (served 1999–2014).
- Michael Charles Green '86 - executive commissioner of the New York State Division of Criminal Justice Services, former District Attorney for Monroe County, New York.
- Daniel F. Keenan - Former member of the Massachusetts House of Representatives (served 1995–2007).
- John Kissel '84 - Member of the Connecticut State Senate
- Lois Lerner - Former director of the Internal Revenue Service Exempt Organizations Unit and central figure of the IRS targeting controversy
- Mark G. Mastroianni '89 - U.S. District Court Judge for the District of Massachusetts (confirmed 2014), Former Hampden County District Attorney
- Robert Meeropol '85 - Activist, former managing editor of Socialist Review and founder of the Rosenberg Fund for Children.
- Maura Melley '78 - Former Secretary of the State of Connecticut (served 1982–1983).
- Tim Murray '94 - Former Lieutenant Governor of Massachusetts and former Mayor of Worcester, Massachusetts.
- Larry O'Brien '42 - Former National Basketball Association Commissioner and former U.S. Postmaster General.
- Angelo Puppolo '01 - Member of the Massachusetts House of Representatives (served 2007–present) and former City Councilor in the city of Springfield, Massachusetts
- Joseph Rallo '76 - State of Louisiana's Commissioner of Higher Education.
- Thomas L. Stevenson '77 - Former member of the Pennsylvania House of Representatives (served 1997–2006).
- John E. Sweeney '91 - Former Republican member of the U.S. House of Representatives from upstate New York and noted conservative legislator.

== See also ==
- Western New England University
