= William A. Reuben =

American journalist and author (1914–2004)

- Born: William Alfred Reuben; November 26, 1914; Cleveland, Ohio
- Died: May 31, 2004 (aged 89); New York City
- Education: University of Pennsylvania; Columbia University
- Occupations: Journalist, author
- Years active: 1946–2000

William A. Reuben (November 26, 1914 – May 31, 2004) was an American investigative journalist and author, best known for writing about the Julius and Ethel Rosenberg atomic espionage case and the Alger Hiss perjury trials.

== Background ==
Reuben was born in Cleveland, Ohio in November 1914. He studied at the Wharton School of the University of Pennsylvania, and then at the Graduate Faculty of English at Columbia University. During World War II, he saw combat as a lieutenant with the 45th Infantry Division in Europe, and received three Purple Hearts.

== Career ==
Reuben began his journalism career in the late 1930s. He wrote for the Condé Nast publications Vogue and House and Garden. He was also a staff member of Judge and Scribner's magazines.

After the war, he contributed numerous articles to Pageant magazine, and started to specialize in investigative reporting, which he did for The Daily Compass and National Guardian. In 1948 he covered the Trenton Six case: the trial of six young black men convicted of murdering a junk-shop dealer in Trenton, New Jersey. Over the next two years, Reuben "publicized the more sensational aspects of the case, notably the predominance of circumstantial evidence and a confession from one of the six that was allegedly made after a beating by the police. Partially on the basis of his work, the Trenton defendants were given a new trial where four of the six were acquitted and the other two given life imprisonment (later changed to six to ten years in prison)."

Reuben served briefly as national publicity director for the American Civil Liberties Union. In the early 1960s, he investigated the case of Dr. Robert Soblen, who had been charged with conspiracy to commit espionage. Reuben then researched and wrote about Mark Fein, a wealthy New Yorker convicted in 1964 of murdering his bookie. In subsequent years, when he wasn't working on the Alger Hiss case, Reuben was a freelance investigative journalist, contributing articles to The Nation and other publications. As one example, he wrote in 1987 about the reported abuse, involving behavior modification experiments, of U.S. female prison inmates.

=== Rosenberg case ===
In summer of 1951, Reuben began researching what he came to regard as a political frame-up in the trial of Julius and Ethel Rosenberg. His first article, "The Rosenberg Conviction: Is This the Dreyfus Case of Cold War America?", appeared on August 15, 1951, in the National Guardian. In response, readers sent in small donations to help fund what they assumed was a committee to free the Rosenbergs. As Reuben later noted, no such committee existed at the time; he and his friends formed one in October 1951 in his Manhattan apartment. He used the collected donations to publish a pamphlet, To Secure Justice in the Rosenberg Case, which contained the Rosenberg trial record along with his seven National Guardian articles. He became Provisional Chairman of the Committee to Secure Justice in the Rosenberg Case, which was established to bring wider attention to what he claimed were the wrongful convictions of Ethel and Julius Rosenberg, and of Morton Sobell. Reuben later published a book about the case, The Atom Spy Hoax (1955).

In 1983 he filed a libel lawsuit against Ronald Radosh and Joyce Milton, authors of The Rosenberg File. In January 1999, historian Joseph E. Persico wrote The New York Times book review of The Haunted Wood: Soviet Espionage in America – the Stalin Era by Allen Weinstein and Aleksandr Vassiliev. Persico stated that Moscow had orchestrated a "worldwide public relations campaign to save Julius and Ethel Rosenberg from the electric chair". Reuben replied in a Letter to the Editor:

It was I and five friends who organized this campaign. No Russian or Communist agents "orchestrated" our activity; no such people exerted control over us.... The worldwide campaign on behalf of the Rosenbergs was caused not by Moscow or its agents but by the shocking facts of the case. The Communist Party of the United States took no action on behalf of the Rosenbergs until October 1952.

=== Hiss case ===
In 1956, Reuben published a book about the Alger Hiss perjury trials, The Honorable Mr. Nixon and the Alger Hiss Case. Thereafter, Reuben spent his time re-examining the evidence and sifting through new evidence, "a task that would occupy him for the rest of his life."

In 1974, Reuben used the Freedom of Information Act to request release of all Hiss-related documents by the FBI. A lawsuit followed, filed by the firm of Rabinowitz, Boudin and Standard, and sponsored by the National Emergency Civil Liberties Foundation. The lawsuit resulted in the release of 300,000 photocopied pages from the FBI and other government agencies. This information was then used by Hiss in an unsuccessful petition to overturn his conviction, in which he alleged misconduct by the FBI and by U.S. Justice Department prosecutor Thomas Francis Murphy.

In 1983, The Nation Institute put out a pamphlet by Reuben entitled Footnote on an Historic Case: In Re Alger Hiss, No. 78 Civ. 3433. In the pamphlet, he claimed to have exposed more than 100 factual errors in the denial of Hiss's petition. Several of Reuben's unpublished writings about the case were subsequently posted on "The Alger Hiss Story" website.

Whenever the topic of the Hiss case arose in print, one could expect Reuben to participate, including discussions around Allen Weinstein's 1978 book Perjury: The Hiss-Chambers Case, the 1992 Volkogonov affair, and Weinstein's 1998 book The Haunted Wood. In its obituary for Hiss, The New York Times characterized Reuben as a friend of Hiss as well as his legal advocate:

To still others, many of them on the left, Mr. Hiss was what William Reuben, a friend and the author of one of the dozens of books on the case, called "an American saint": an idealistic New Dealer and rising star in the foreign policy establishment whose career was ruined when he was framed, in part to discredit the New Deal.

At the time of his death, Reuben was finishing a manuscript about the Hiss case, on which he had worked off and on for almost half a century.

== Personal life ==
In a 1986 interview, Reuben labeled himself a student of English semantics.

In a tribute to Reuben, The Nation magazine editors called him "a walking encyclopedia on the Rosenberg and Hiss cases, raising loud challenges on behalf of the defendants, whom he regarded as wrongly convicted." They jokingly added, "When not defending underdogs, Reuben could be found at the racetrack, where he frequently played the favorite."

== Death ==
Reuben died of natural causes on May 31, 2004, in New York City, at the age of 89.

== Works ==
- To Secure Justice in the Rosenberg Case (1951)
- The Atom Spy Hoax (1955)
- The Honorable Mr. Nixon and the Alger Hiss case (1956)
- The Mark Fein Case (1967)
- Footnote on an Historic Case: In Re Alger Hiss, No. 78 Civ. 3433 (1983)

== See also ==
- Julius and Ethel Rosenberg
- Morton Sobell
- Alger Hiss
- Richard Nixon
- Whittaker Chambers
