= After the Bite =

- Official poster
- Directed by: Ivy Meeropol
- Produced by: Ivy Meeropol; Xan Parker; Johnny Fego
- Cinematography: Stephen T. Maing; Soren Nielsen
- Edited by: Seth Bornse
- Music by: Morgan Visconti
- Production companies: HBO Documentary Films; Reversal Films; Red 50 Inc.
- Distributed by: HBO
- Release dates: June 15, 2023 (Provincetown); July 26, 2023
- Running time: 88 minutes
- Country: United States
- Language: English

After the Bite is a 2023 American documentary film directed and produced by Ivy Meeropol. It follows the local community of Cape Cod, as they grapple with the alarming amount of sharks being spotted, while investigating the science behind it.

It had its world premiere at the Provincetown International Film Festival on June 15, 2023, and was released on July 26, 2023, by HBO.

== Plot ==
Following the death of young man at a local beach in Cape Cod, the local community and vacationers grapple with the amount of rising shark spottings while local scientists and researchers investigate the reason for their appearance. Lisa Sette, Greg Skomal, Meg Winton, Alec Wilkinson and Crocker Snow appear in the film.

== Production ==
Following the death of a young man at a local beach in Cape Cod, Ivy Meeropol was aware and noticing the changes and effects with sharks in the community, having the idea for a film. Meeropol followed fishermen, researchers and lifeguards. Meeropol, cinematographers Stephen T. Maing and Soren Nielsen would go out shooting in the water with fishermen, with the chance they wouldn't capture anything. Maing used an underwater GoPro on a stick to capture footage of sharks, seals, and fish. Meeropol was unable to obtain permits to film researchers at work, researcher Milton Levin contributed footage of seals. During post-production, Meeropol picked subjects who were essential to moving the story along, with some subjects being cut.

In May 2021, it was announced Meeropol would direct the film, with HBO Documentary Films producing, and HBO distributing.

== Release ==
The film had its world premiere at the Provincetown International Film Festival on June 15, 2023. It also screened at the Nantucket Film Festival on June 22, 2023. It was released on July 26, 2023, by HBO.

== Reception ==
On the review aggregator website Rotten Tomatoes, 100% of 6 critics' reviews are positive, with an average rating of 8.40/10. Metacritic, which uses a weighted average, assigned the film a score of 70 out of 100, based on 5 critics, indicating "generally favorable" reviews.

Nick Allan of Roger Ebert gave the film a three and a half out of four stars, writing: "An impressive tapestry of conflicting perspectives—man and animal—that's far more entertaining and insightful than your average Shark Week fare." Chase Hutchinson of Collider gave the film a B+, writing: "Through the eyes of a Cape Cod community where disaster strikes, director Ivy Meeropol gently moves beyond the spectacle that defines the history of sharks to immerse us further in their world while grappling with many pressing questions on the journey."
