= National Committee to Secure Justice in the Rosenberg Case =

- Founded: 1951; 75 years ago
- Type: Nonprofit
- Headquarters: New York City, NY, U.S.

National Committee to Secure Justice in the Rosenberg Case, also known as the Rosenberg Committee, was an organization formed by the National Guardian to defend Julius and Ethel Rosenberg and secure clemency for them.

== History ==
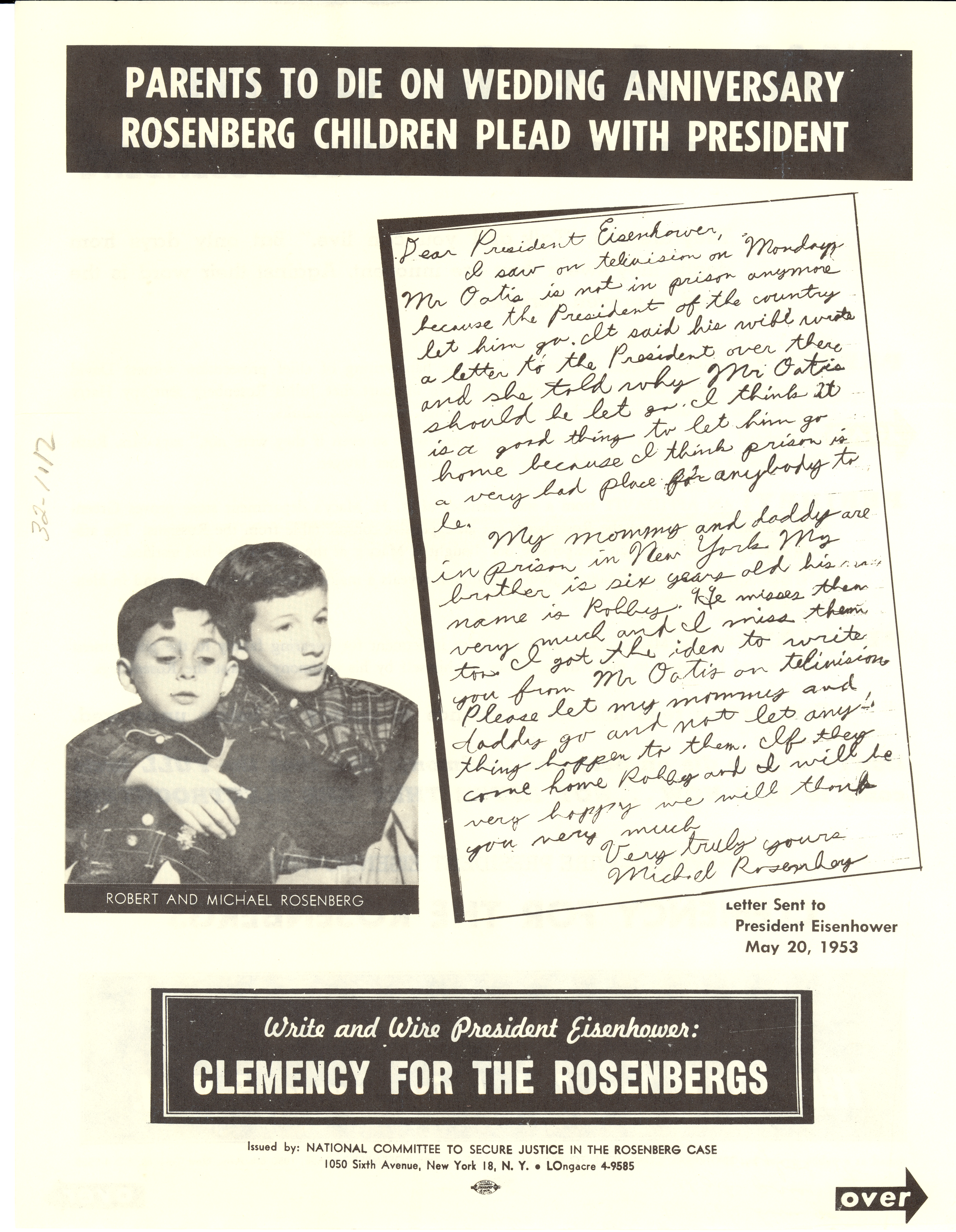
Robert and Michael Rosenberg on a pamphlet issued by the Rosenberg Committee, May 1953

In August 1951, the journalist William A. Reuben began writing articles concerning the trial of the Rosenbergs. When readers began sending money in, he and his friends formed their committee "in my Manhattan apartment" in October 1951. They used the monies to publish the trial record with Reuben's Guardian articles in pamphlet form. After readers began sending money, Reuben and his friends formed a committee in Reuben's Manhattan apartment in October 1951. They used the monies to publish the trial record with Reuben's National Guardian articles in pamphlet form. After the organization was assembled, Reuben served as the provisional chairman.

In 1953, during the Second Red Scare, the National Community Relations Advisory Council (NCRAC) alleged that the Rosenberg Committee was promoting public panic within the Jewish community due to the committee's belief that antisemitism was a factor in the Rosenberg trial. The advisory council considered the Rosenberg Committee a communist group. The NCRAC included the Union of American Hebrew Congregations, the American Jewish Committee, the Jewish War Veterans of the United States of America, the Jewish Labor Committee, and the American Jewish Congress.

In 1974, the committee changed its name to the National Committee to Reopen the Rosenberg Case. It picketed the Manhattan federal courthouse each year near the execution date, ending in 1992 with Judge Irving Kaufman's death. Aaron Katz led the group from 1963 to 2005.

== See also ==
- Antisemitism in the United States
- Julius and Ethel Rosenberg
- McCarthyism and antisemitism
- National Guardian
- National Rosenberg Defence Committee
