= Ask E. Jean (film) =

2025 American documentary film

- Theatrical release poster
- Directed by: Ivy Meeropol
- Produced by: Ivy Meeropol; Laura Bickford; Annabelle Dunne
- Cinematography: Martina Radwan
- Edited by: Leah Goudsmit; Ferne Pearlstein
- Production companies: Red 50 Inc.; Flora Films; Impact Partners
- Distributed by: Abramorama
- Release dates: August 30, 2025 (Telluride); May 22, 2026 (United States)
- Running time: 91 minutes
- Country: United States
- Language: English
- Box office: $63,410

Ask E. Jean is a 2025 American documentary film, directed and produced by Ivy Meeropol. It follows the life and career of E. Jean Carroll and her legal battles against Donald Trump. It had its world premiere at the 52nd Telluride Film Festival on August 30, 2025. It was released on May 22, 2026 by Abramorama.

== Production ==
E. Jean Carroll previously turned down attempts to make a documentary about her. However, her mind changed after being asked by Ivy Meeropol and viewing her work. Graydon Carter and Sheila Nevins are among the executive producers. Some backers asked to have their names removed from the project, due to the political environment.

== Release ==
The film had its world premiere at the 52nd Telluride Film Festival on August 30, 2025. It also screened at the Hamptons International Film Festival, Woodstock Film Festival, Middleburg Film Festival, and DOC NYC. In March 2026, Abramorama acquired distribution rights to the film, and set it for a May 22, 2026, release. It was released on video on demand through Kinema on September 2, 2026.

== Reception ==
On the review aggregator website Rotten Tomatoes, 97% of 36 critics' reviews are positive, with an average rating of 7.6/10. Metacritic, which uses a weighted average, assigned the film a score of 76 out of 100, based on six critics, indicating "generally favorable" reviews.
