= Ivy Meeropol =

American filmmaker (born 1968)

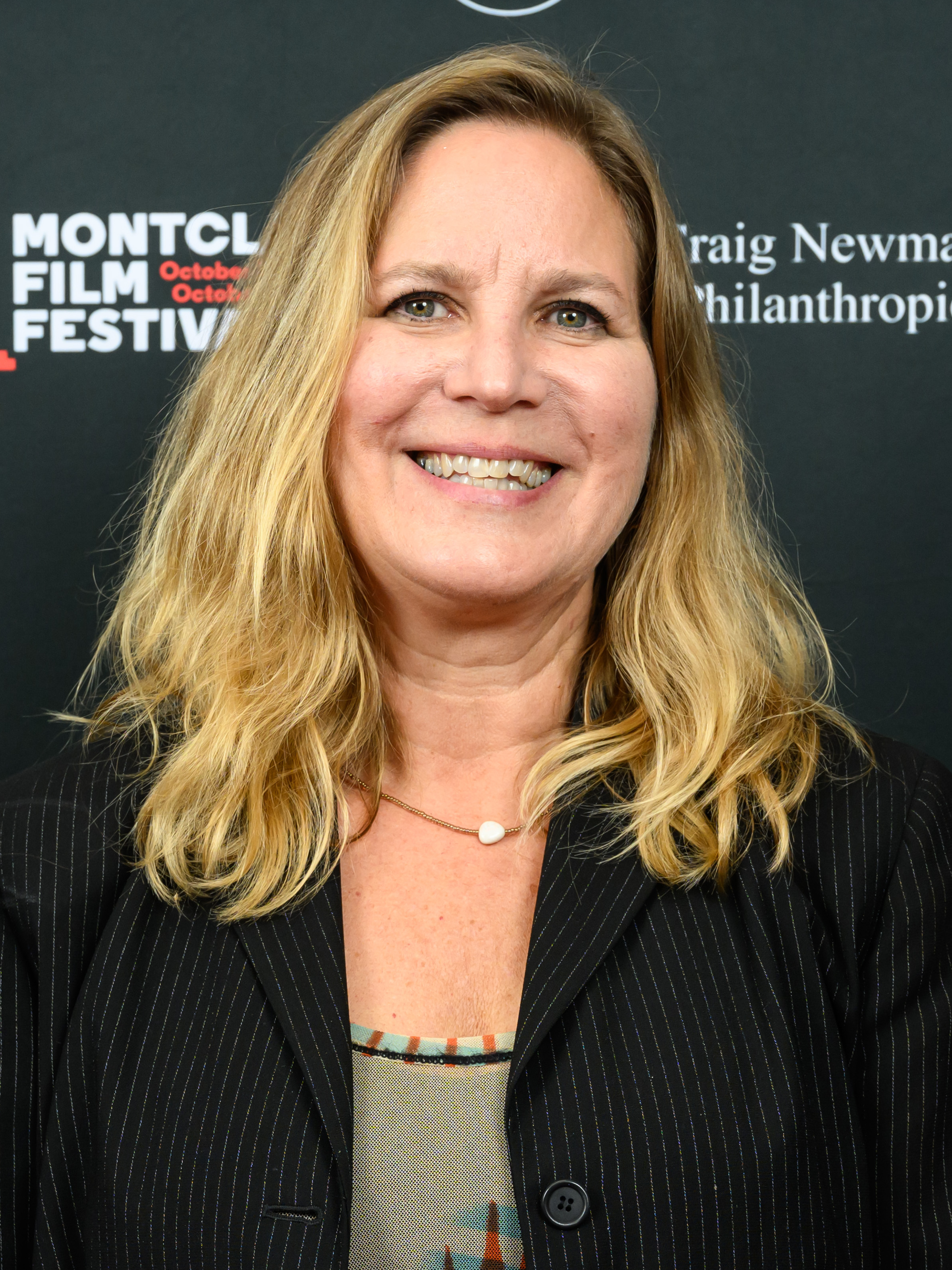
- Meeropol at the 2025 Montclair Film Festival
- Born: October 13, 1968 (age 58)
- Education: Sarah Lawrence College
- Occupation: Filmmaker
- Spouse: Thomas Ambrose
- Children: 2
- Parent(s): Michael Meeropol; Ann Karus Meeropol
- Relatives: Julius and Ethel Rosenberg (paternal grandparents); Robert Meeropol (uncle)

Ivy Meeropol (born October 13, 1968) is an American director and producer of documentaries for film and television, known for Indian Point and Heir to an Execution. She is the daughter of Michael Meeropol and Ann Karus Meeropol and granddaughter of Julius and Ethel Rosenberg, and adoptive granddaughter of Abel Meeropol (pen name: Lewis Allan), author of "Strange Fruit" and "The House I Live In". A graduate of Sarah Lawrence College, she served as a legislative aide to Congressman Harry Johnston.

== Career ==
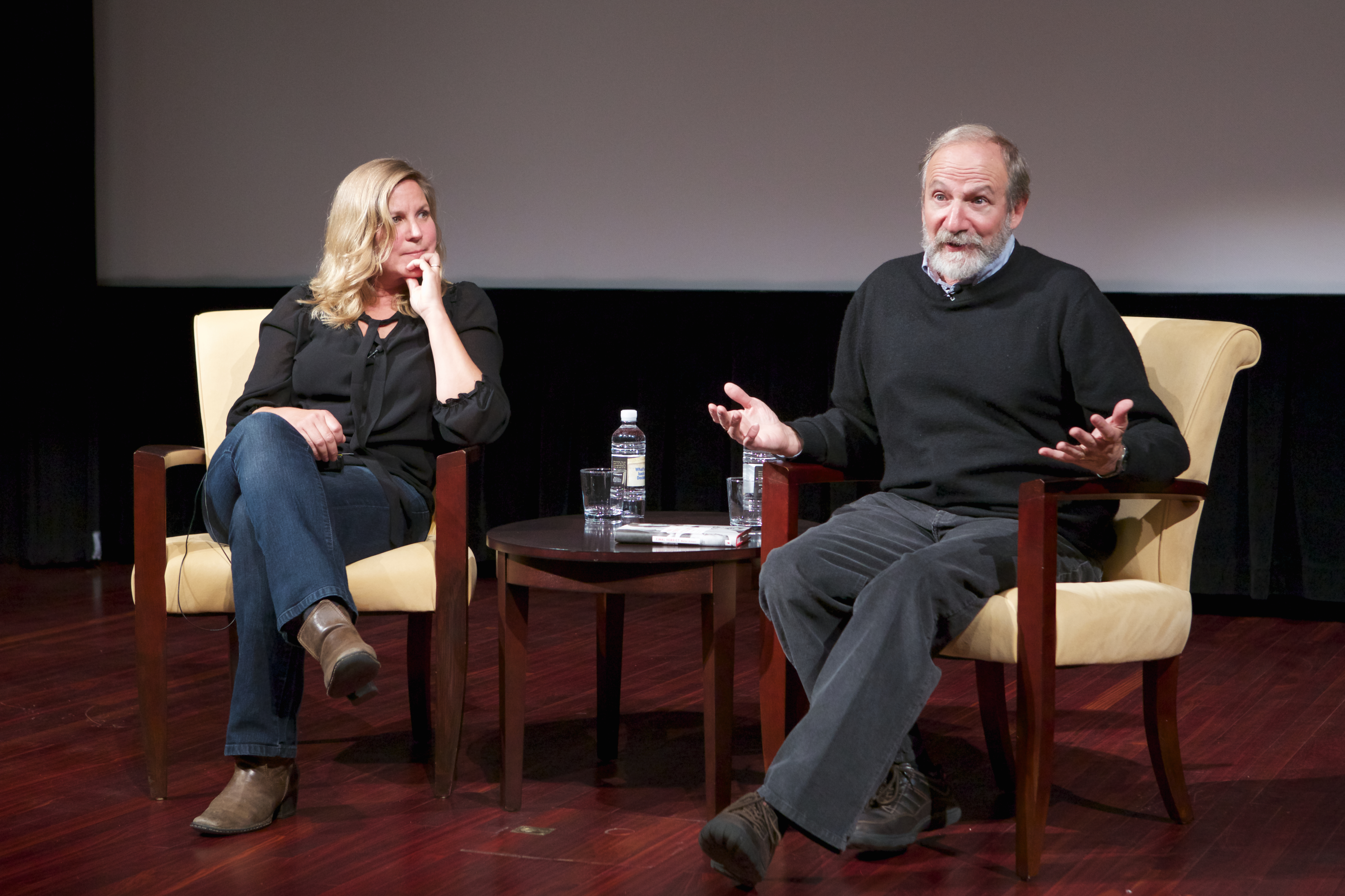
Meeropol (left) and her father Michael speak after a screening of Heir to an Execution by the National Archives and Records Administration, November 12, 2014

Meeropol worked as a speechwriter and legislative aide to Congressman Harry Johnston of Florida, and then began a career as a journalist, publishing articles in The New York Times, O, The Oprah Magazine, Premiere, Nest, Paper, Black Book Magazine, and Provincetown Arts Magazine, where she was also the fiction editor.

Meeropol produced her film, Heir to an Execution, to explore her family's conflicted views of the Rosenbergs' trial and subsequent execution. The film was featured at the Sundance Film Festival and was shortlisted for an Academy Award. In a 2004 interview with FF2 Media's Jan Lisa Huttner, Meeropol commented on the connection between the events in the film and the then-current Bush administration:

The McCarthy era was all about quashing dissent in the name of national security, and that's what we're doing today. There were massive, peaceful marches in the period leading up to the start of the Iraq War, but the protesters were told that they were "unpatriotic." You don't support the troops if you have any questions for the government? This country is supposed to be about encouraging dissent; that's the beauty of democracy.

Ivy Meeropol also directed a six-part documentary series for the Sundance Channel entitled The Hill. It focused on the work of four young staff members at the office of congressman Robert Wexler as they responded to his electoral defeat in the 2004 presidential election. The documentary aired on the Sundance Channel in August and September 2006.

In 2013, Meeropol was a Sundance Institute Fellow, and was awarded grants from the Sundance Documentary Fund, The NY State Council for the Arts, and The MacArthur Foundation.

In 2016, Meeropol directed and produced the documentary film Indian Point, which explores the issues surrounding the use of nuclear energy by looking at the Indian Point Energy Center, located just 35 miles from the heart of New York City.

In 2019, Meeropol revisited the story of her grandparents to inquire into the man who prosecuted them, Roy Cohn. She directed and produced Bully. Coward. Victim. The Story of Roy Cohn. In an interview with Women and Hollywood, Meeropol pointed out the urgency of the Roy Cohn story in light of the Trump administration:

I want people to understand why Donald Trump’s relationship with Cohn is critically important, and help audiences to gain a deeper insight into how Cohn helped set Trump on a path that reverberates today. This film is my way of impressing upon audiences that the past is very much present, and we would be wise not to forget how we got here.

In 2023, Meeropol directed After the Bite for HBO, a documentary revolving around the local community in Cape Cod, grappling with the sightings of sharks and the science behind their appearance.

In 2025, Meeropol directed Ask E. Jean, a documentary revolving around the life and career of E. Jean Carroll, which had its world premiere at the 52nd Telluride Film Festival.

== Personal life ==
Her father is Jewish and her mother is Lithuanian-Irish Catholic. Meeropol lives in the Hudson Valley with her husband, production designer Thomas Ambrose, and their two children.

== Filmography ==
Year	Title	Producer	Director	Notes
2004	Heir to an Execution	Yes	Yes	Cinematographer. Also appears in the documentary.
2006	The Hill	Yes	Yes	Documentary TV series.
2015	Indian Point	Yes	Yes	Writer.
2017	THE END: Inside the Last Days of the Obama White House	Yes	No	Senior producer.
2019	Museum Town	Yes	No	
2019	Bully. Coward. Victim. The Story of Roy Cohn	Yes	Yes	
2023	After the Bite	Yes	Yes	
2025	Ask E. Jean	Yes	Yes	
