= Rosenberg Fund for Children =

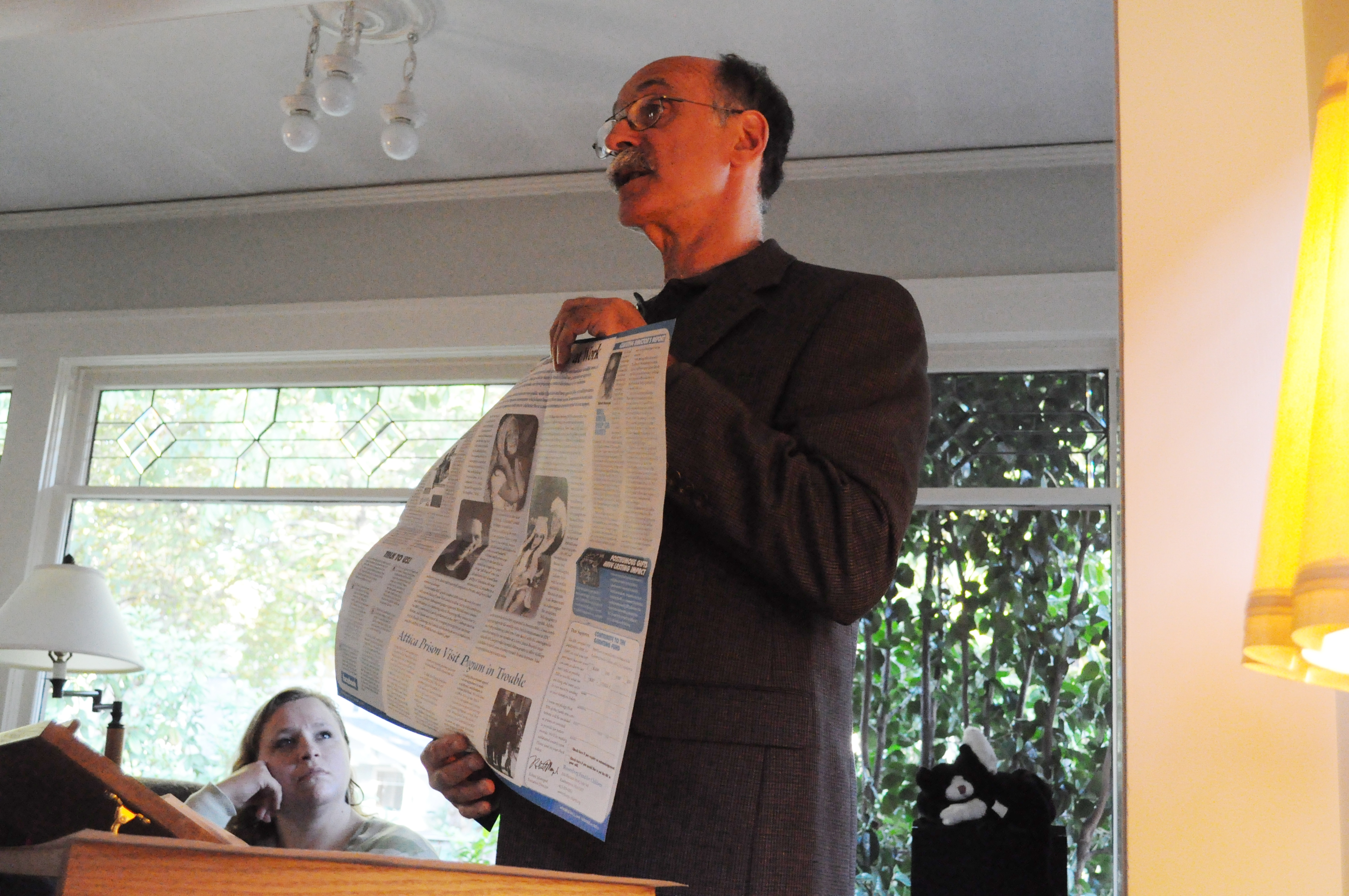
Robert Meeropol (2009) holding a copy of the RFC newsletter.

The Rosenberg Fund for Children (RFC) is a public foundation started in 1990 by Robert Meeropol and named in honor of his parents Ethel and Julius Rosenberg, the only two United States civilians executed for conspiracy to commit espionage during the Cold War.

Orphaned at age 6, Robert was adopted by Anne and Abel Meeropol.

After my parents’ arrests, my relatives were so frightened of being associated with "communist spies" that they refused to take me into their homes. First I lived in a shelter. Later I lived with friends of my parents in New Jersey, but I was thrown out of school after the Board of Education found out who I was. After my parents' execution, the police even seized me from the home of my future adoptive parents, and I was placed in an orphanage.

— Robert Meeropol, Rosenberg Fund Website – "Our Story"

At a fundraiser on the 50th anniversary of his parents' execution, Robert described the fund, which he runs, as his "constructive revenge."

The fund "makes grants to aid children in the U.S. whose parents are targeted, progressive activists" and to "assist youth who themselves have been targeted as a result of their progressive activities." They do not pay for legal expenses. As of 2012, the organization has given over $4.5 million in grants to nearly 500 children since 1990.
