= National Rosenberg Defence Committee =

British civil liberties organization

- Founded: 1952; 74 years ago
- Type: Nonprofit
- Headquarters: England

The National Rosenberg Defence Committee (NRDC) was a British civil liberties organization formed to defend Ethel and Julius Rosenberg and seek clemency for them.

== History ==
The National Rosenberg Defence Committee was formed in England in 1952 as the British counterpart to the US-based National Committee to Secure Justice in the Rosenberg Case, also known as the Rosenberg Committee. Committee members included Felicity Whittaker, Percy Belcher, Rev. Stanley Evans, and D.N. Pritt, QC. Belcher served as Secretary. The organization sought support by holding public rallies as well as by writing letters to labor unions, leftist groups, and Jewish publications throughout the UK. Many British writers expressed support for the committee, including Graham Greene, Dylan Thomas, Sean O'Casey.

On 12 June of 1954, W. E. B. Du Bois wrote a letter of sympathy to the committee's commemoration meeting.

Hours prior to the execution of the Rosenbergs, around 20 members of the Committee went to the London home of Prime Minister Winston Churchill to deliver a note requesting that Churchill directly appeal "to President Eisenhower over the Transatlantic telephone immediately." Churchill responded with a note saying "It is not within my duty or my power to intervene in this matter. (Signed) Winston Churchill."

== See also ==
- National Committee to Secure Justice in the Rosenberg Case
