= Committee on Military Affairs =

Committee on Military Affairs may refer to:

- United States House Committee on Military Affairs
- United States Senate Committee on Military Affairs

== See also ==
- Defence Committee (disambiguation)
