= Fyke Farmer =

American lawyer

- Born: November 25, 1901; Cedar Hill, Tennessee
- Died: May 23, 1997 (aged 95)
- Burial place: Elmwood Cemetery, Springfield, Robertson County, Tennessee, USA; 36.504950°N 86.892080°W
- Other name: Fyke Farmer Sr.
- Known for: Julius and Ethel Rosenberg; Peoples' World Constituent Assembly (1950-51)
- Spouse: Fanny Richards Leake
- Children: Dorothy Leake Farmer, Mary Sue Farmer Saltsman, Anne Farmer Erwin, Fyke Farmer Jr.

Fyke Farmer (November 25, 1901 – May 23, 1997) was a Tennessee lawyer, peace activist and world government advocate who became well known for the case of Julius and Ethel Rosenberg.

== Biography ==
He was born on November 25, 1901, in Cedar Hill, Tennessee. He married Fanny Richards Leake, daughter of Charles Richards Leake. They had three daughters, Dorothy Leake Farmer, Mary Sue Farmer, and Anne Farmer and a son Fyke Farmer.

During the Vietnam War, he was called on to represent draft resisters.

=== Julius and Ethel Rosenberg case ===
Farmer argued that the Rosenbergs were tried under the wrong law, claiming that the Atomic Energy Act, under which a sentence of death can be imposed only upon recommendation of a jury, should have been applied rather than the Espionage Act of 1917, which leaves that power exclusively to the discretion of the court. On the basis of Farmer's arguments, a temporary stay was granted to the Rosenbergs by Justice William O. Douglas on 17 June 1953. The United States Supreme Court vacated Douglas's stay by a vote of 6–3. The Rosenbergs were executed on 19 June 1953. In 1990, Farmer filed "United States ex rel. Farmer v. Kaufman" against Irving R. Kaufman, the judge who presided over the Rosenbergs' trial, but he was found to have no standing to sue Kaufman. His papers are archived at the Library of Congress.

=== Peoples' World Convention ===
In 1950 and 1951, Farmer was instrumental in the organization of the 'Peoples' World Convention (PWC)' also known as the 'Peoples' World Constituent Assembly (PWCA)' in Geneva, Switzerland. Signers and sponsors for PWC were Albert Einstein, Gerhard Domagk, Robert Hutchins, Kerstin Hesselgren, John Steinbeck, Lord Beveridge, Hu Shih, Yehudi Menuhin, Jaques Maritain, Sir John Boyd Orr, Thomas Mann, Sarvapalli Radhakrishnan and Roberto Rosselini.

== See also ==
- Emergency Committee of Atomic Scientists
- World government
- World Constitutional Convention
