= Michael Meeropol =

American retired professor (born 1943)

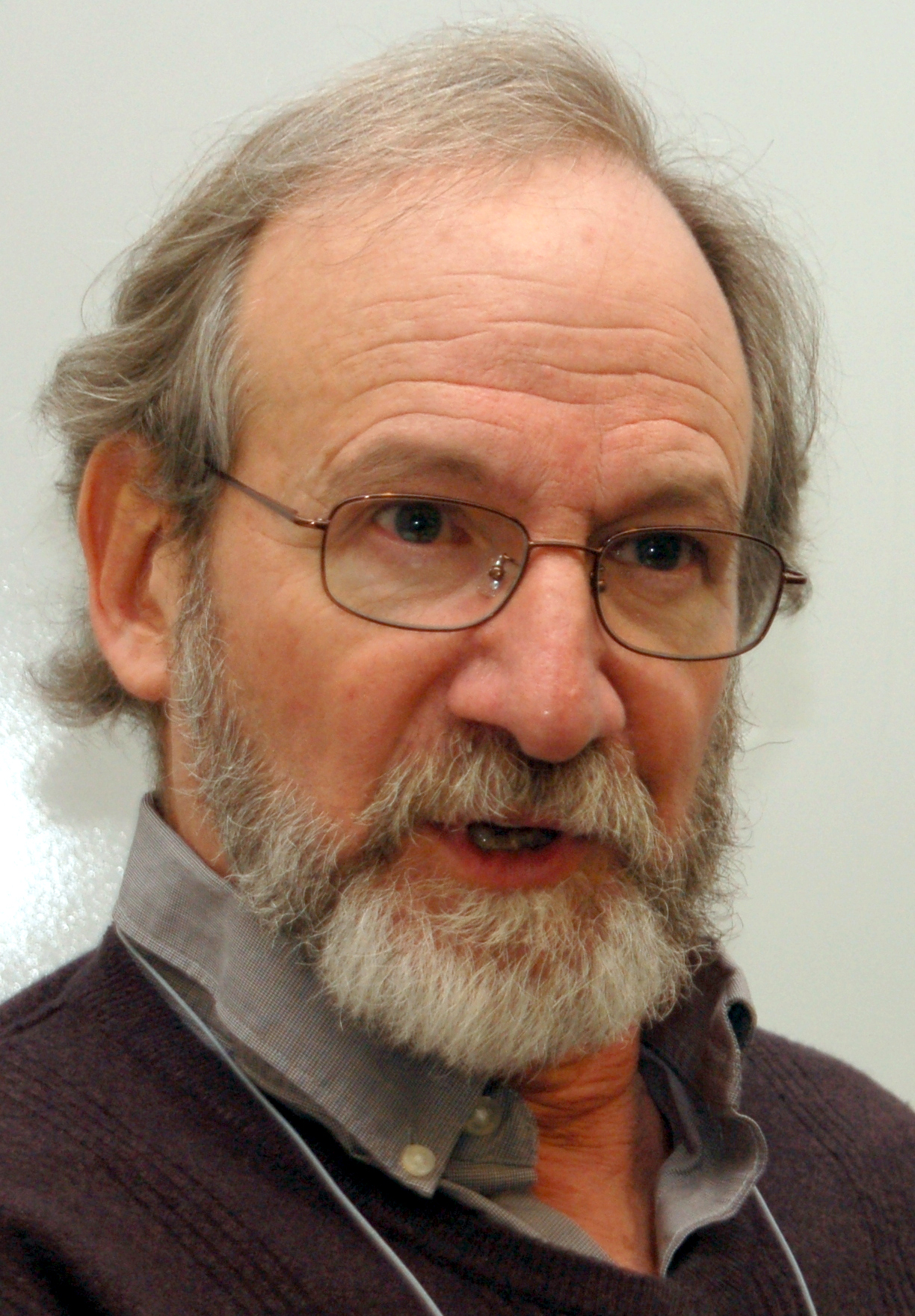
- Meeropol in 2011
- Born: Michael Rosenberg; March 10, 1943 (age 83); New York City, New York, U.S.
- Education: Swarthmore College (BA); King's College, Cambridge (MA); University of Wisconsin, Madison (PhD)
- Spouse: Ann Karusaitis (m. 1965; died 2019)
- Children: 2, including Ivy
- Parent: Julius and Ethel Rosenberg
- Relatives: Robert Meeropol (brother); David Greenglass (uncle)

Michael Meeropol (born Michael Rosenberg on March 10, 1943) is an American economist, author, radio commentator, and retired professor of economics. He is professor emeritus of economics at Western New England University and has written extensively on United States economic policy, including the book Surrender: How the Clinton Administration Completed the Reagan Revolution and, with Howard J. Sherman, the textbook Principles of Macroeconomics: Activist vs. Austerity Policies. He is also known, together with his brother Robert Meeropol, for efforts to reassess the prosecution and execution of their parents, Julius and Ethel Rosenberg, who were convicted of conspiracy to commit espionage in 1951 and subsequently executed in 1953.

== Early life and education ==
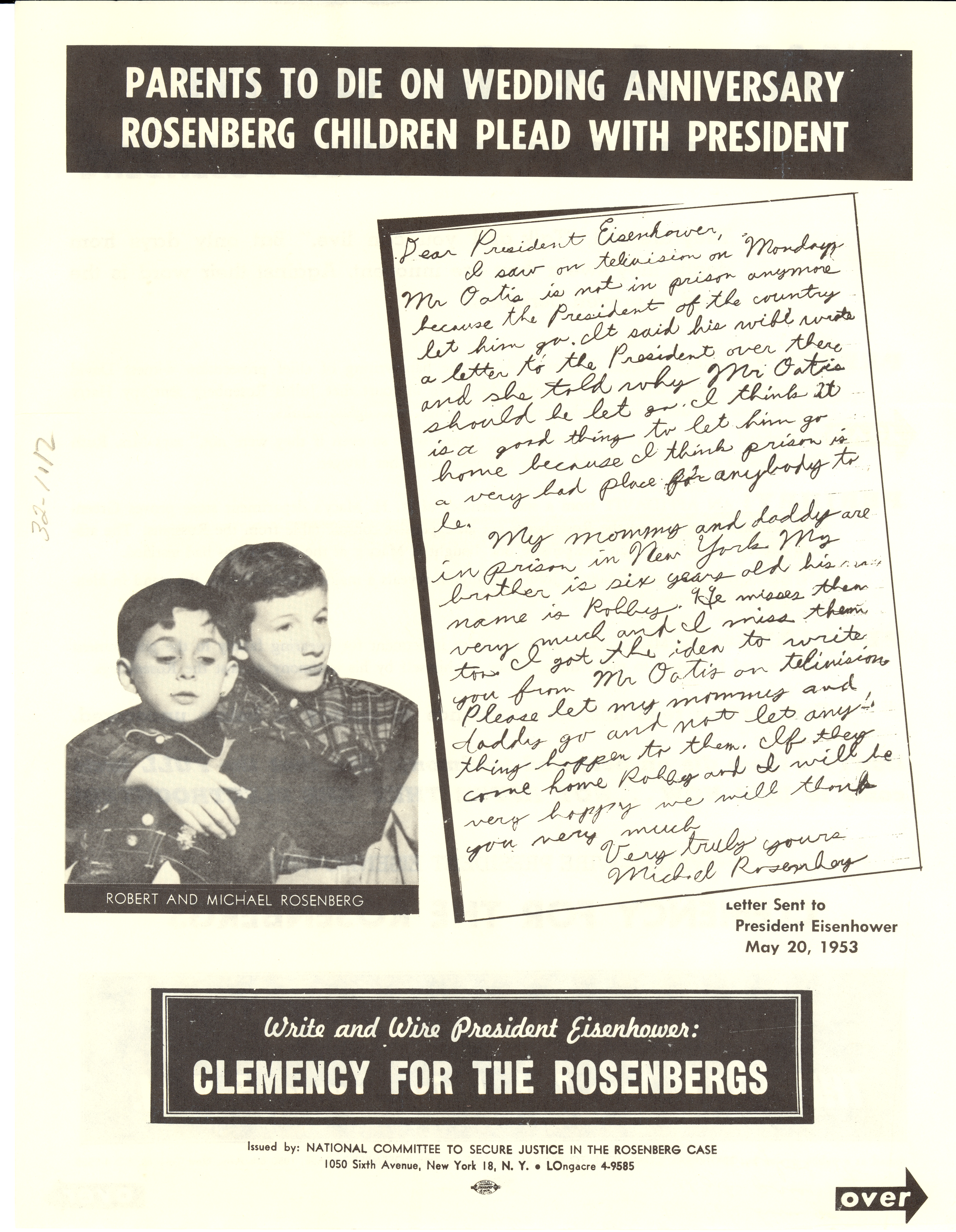
Meeropol and his brother Robert on a pamphlet issued by the National Committee to Secure Justice in the Rosenberg Case, May 1953

Born in New York City as Michael Rosenberg, Meeropol spent his early childhood living in New York and attending local school there. His father Julius, an electrical engineer, and his mother Ethel (née Greenglass), a union organizer, were members of the Communist Party USA.

When Michael was seven years old, his parents were apprehended. In 1951, they were convicted and sentenced to death for conspiracy to commit espionage related to the passing of atomic secrets to the Soviet Union. After two years, during which they both maintained their innocence, and a worldwide campaign for executive clemency raged, they were executed in June 1953.

During the trial, Michael and his younger brother Robert lived first with their maternal grandmother, Tessie Greenglass, until November 1950, when she placed them in the Hebrew Children's Home on 205th street in Bedford Park, Bronx. In June 1951, they moved in with their paternal grandmother, Sophie Rosenberg, in upper Manhattan until June 1952, at which time they were taken in by family friends, Ben and Sonia Bach, in Toms River, New Jersey, from June 1952 until the December after their parents' executions on June 19, 1953. The superintendent of the Toms River schools "turned the boys away as non-residents".

The brothers were eventually adopted by the lyricist, librettist, and musician Abel Meeropol and his wife Anne, whose first children had been stillborn. Taking their last name, Michael and Robert grew up first in Manhattan and then (after 1961) in Hastings-on-Hudson, New York.

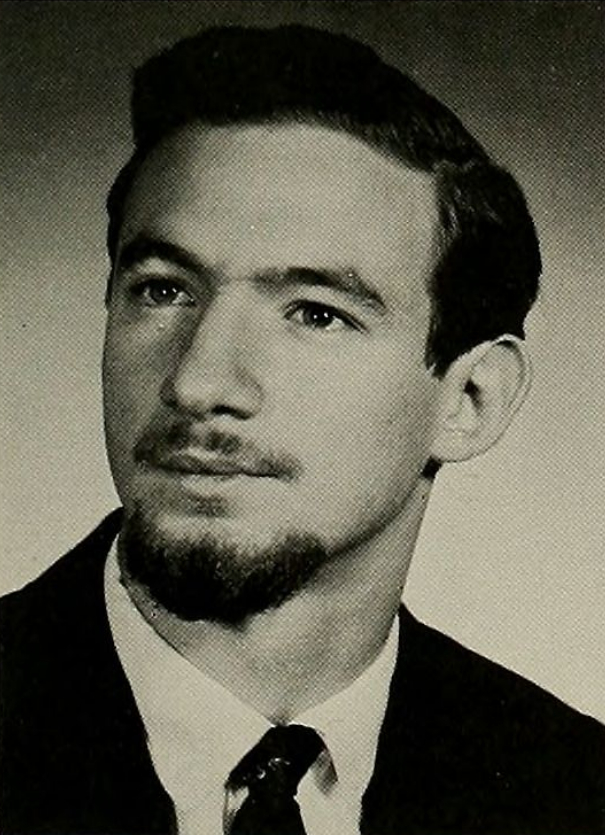
Meeropol in the Swarthmore College yearbook, 1964

Michael graduated with a B.A. from Swarthmore College in 1964 before going on to graduate work at King's College, Cambridge, earning another B.A in 1966 and then an M.A. in 1970. In 1973, he received his Ph.D. in economics from the University of Wisconsin–Madison.

== Career ==
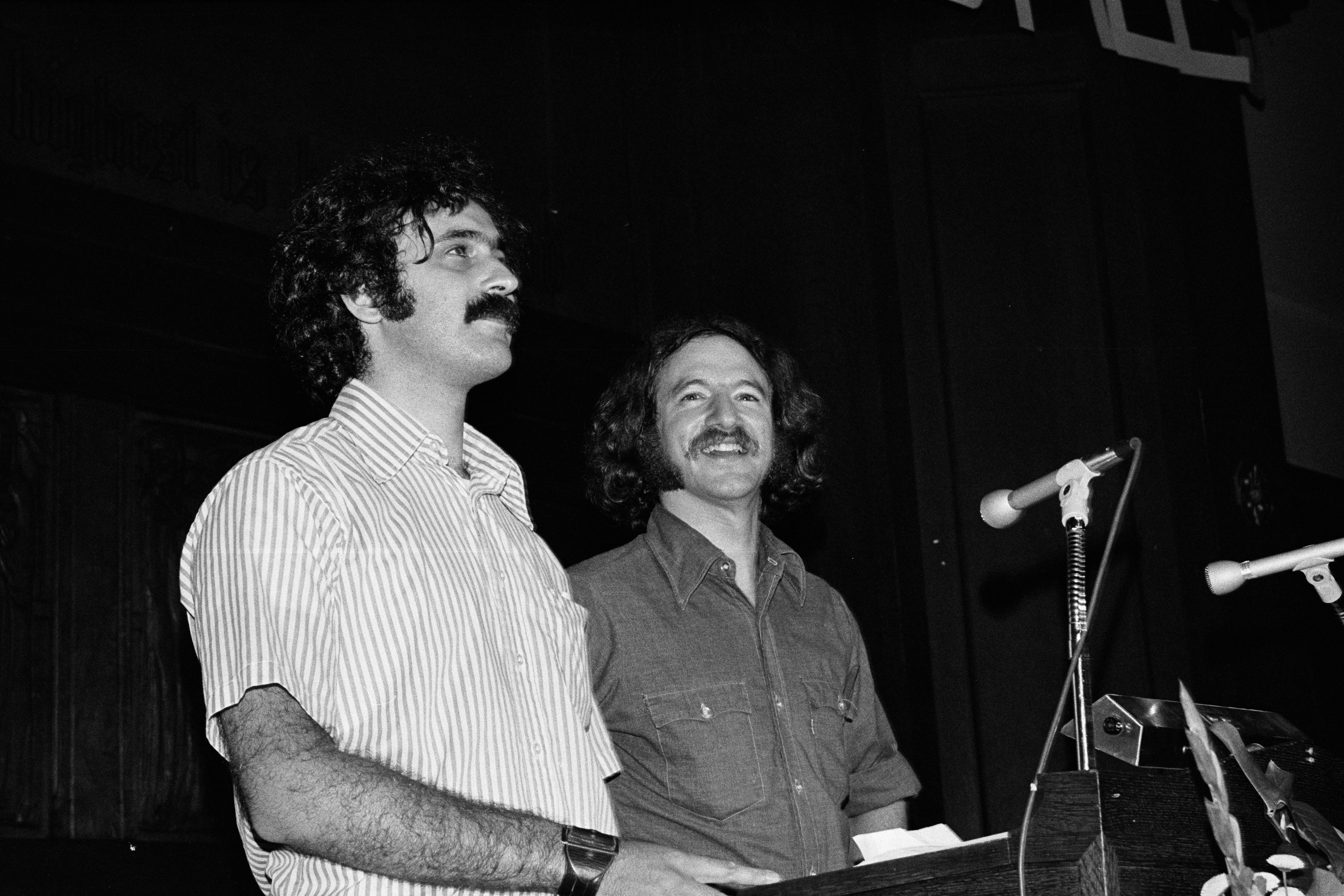
Meeropol (right) with his brother Robert at a memorial event for their parents in Manhattan, New York, June 19, 1975

Meeropol became an economist, teaching at Western New England College (now Western New England University), a small private college in Springfield, Massachusetts. In 1998 he authored Surrender: How the Clinton Administration Completed the Reagan Revolution. Many of his articles have advocated liberal to left-wing economic policies, including, in 2005, his opposition to the Bush administration's efforts to partially privatize Social Security. Since September 2006 he has been a monthly commentator on the Albany NPR-affiliate WAMC radio.

He and his brother Robert have written about their parents as well as participated in documentaries about them. Together they wrote We Are Your Sons (1975). A second edition was published in 1986 with three new chapters, including a rebuttal to the book, The Rosenberg File. Meeropol said that even though the authors got it "right" about the (partial) guilt of Julius Rosenberg, they were "right" in the way that a stopped clock is right twice a day.

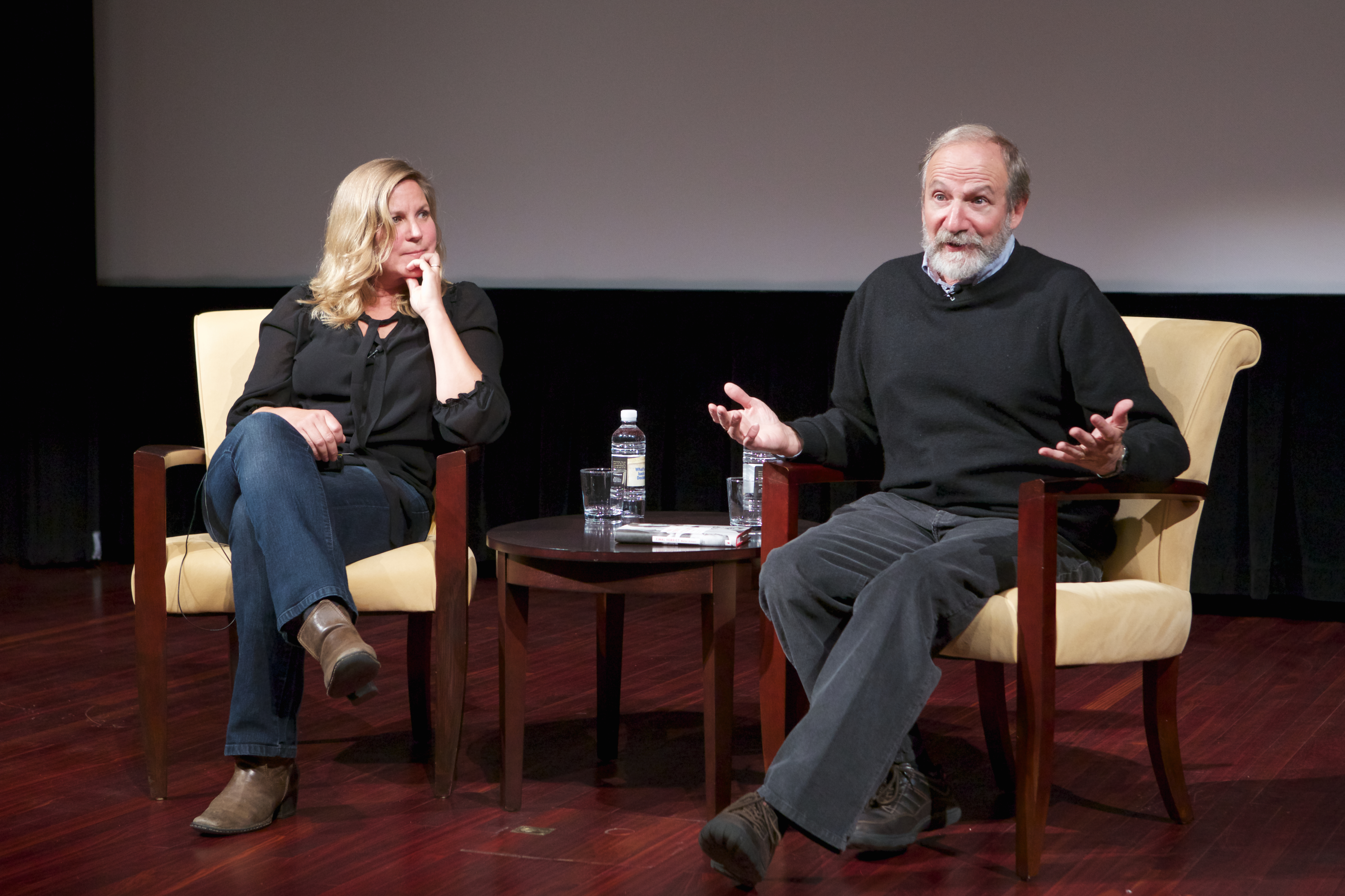
Meeropol (right) and his daughter Ivy speak after a screening of Heir to an Execution by the National Archives and Records Administration, November 12, 2014

Meeropol separately edited a complete edition of his parents' prison correspondence, The Rosenberg Letters (1994). Ivy Meeropol interviewed both brothers about the Rosenberg trial and his childhood for her 2004 film Heir to an Execution, and included new comments from Michael in her 2019 documentary on Roy Cohn. In the latter, we see the younger Michael Meeropol debating Roy Cohn in 1981, as well as re-visiting Sing Sing in September 2018.

In December 2008, Meeropol retired as professor of economics and chair of the department at Western New England University. He worked for four years at John Jay College of Criminal Justice of the City University of New York teaching economics and interdisciplinary studies. He taught his last class at John Jay in May 2014.

In 2013, he co-authored a textbook, Principles Of Macroeconomics: Activist vs. Austerity Policies.

== Position on environmental issues ==
Michael Meeropol together with 60 other scientists, endorsed an appeal linking peace, justice and climate created by Fridays For Future International. The main idea of the appeal is that we can not stop the ecological crisis without stopping overconsumption and this is impossible as wars continue because GDP is directly linked to military potential. As climate change threaten more or less all, even the billionaires, it is good for all to establish peace and justice. 24 organizations including Scientist Rebellion endorsed the appeal. While signing, Meeropol put the next comment: “Stopping global warming is a matter of survival for human civilization. It cannot be done without the entire world's population working together.”

== Personal life ==
In December 1965, Meeropol married Ann Karusaitis. They have two children, Ivy and Greg, and two grandchildren. In 2009, Meeropol and Karusaitis moved to Cold Spring, New York.

Karusaitis died in May 2019.

== Position on parents' executions ==
In 2008, after the Rosenberg co-defendant Morton Sobell admitted that he and Julius Rosenberg had engaged in espionage on behalf of the Soviet Union during World War II, Michael and Robert Meeropol agreed that their father was a Soviet spy. But they reiterated what they perceived to be the failures of the government prosecution:

"[W]hatever atomic bomb information their father passed to the Russians was, at best, superfluous; the case was riddled with prosecutorial and judicial misconduct; their mother was convicted on flimsy evidence to place leverage on her husband, and neither deserved the death penalty."

A month later, the brothers published an op-ed in the Los Angeles Times stating that Sobell's confession revealed no detail about the theft of the atom bomb design. They noted that the witness Ruth Greenglass' recently released grand jury testimony said nothing about Ethel Rosenberg's alleged spying activities, for which the government convicted her.

The Meeropol brothers have endorsed the conclusions of Walter Schneir, in his posthumously published book Final Verdict, that Greenglass's version of events was concocted – that Julius Rosenberg had been given notice of termination by the KGB in early 1945, and thus was out of the espionage loop when a cross-section drawing of an implosion-type atomic bomb (exhibit 8 at the Rosenberg Trial) was passed to the Soviets. Schneir said that David and / or Ruth Greenglass turned that drawing and descriptive material over to a KGB agent in December 1945 – not, as testified at the trial, to Julius Rosenberg in September 1945.

In 2015, after the death of David Greenglass, his secret grand jury testimony was released. Claiming that that testimony supported their view that their mother was not an espionage agent (twice Greenglass under oath before the grand jury asserted he had never spoken with his sister about any of his espionage activities with Julius Rosenberg or Ruth Greenglass) the brothers Meeropol wrote an August 2015 op-ed in The New York Times demanding that the US government exonerate their mother. On September 28, 2015, the date that would have been Ethel Rosenberg's 100th birthday, the brothers and eight members of their extended families (including one great-grandchild of the Rosenbergs) gathered on the steps of New York's City Hall to receive two proclamations – one by 13 City Council members and one by the Borough President of Manhattan honoring Ethel Rosenberg and decrying her reputedly false conviction and execution.

Meeropol and his brother Robert appeared on the CBS news magazine show 60 Minutes in October 2016, arguing that their mother deserved exoneration because of the recent release of grand jury testimony by her chief accuser, David Greenglass, which directly contradicted his trial testimony against her. They submitted requests to President Barack Obama for a proclamation to in effect nullify the original jury verdict because of the perjuries involved in the government's case against her. This request was accompanied by the documents including grand jury minutes supporting their arguments. On December 1, 2016, Meeropol and his brother Robert stood outside the White House gate to symbolically re-create the effort they engaged in back in 1953 when Michael delivered a handwritten letter to President Dwight D. Eisenhower asking for clemency for his parents to a White House guard. They turned in petitions containing more than 60,000 signatures in support of their request. The request received no response, and it is unclear if President Obama was ever aware of the request.

In 2018, Meeropol published an article revisiting his uncle David Greenglass' testimony and role in the Rosenberg case.
