= Robert Meeropol =

American anthropologist (born 1947)

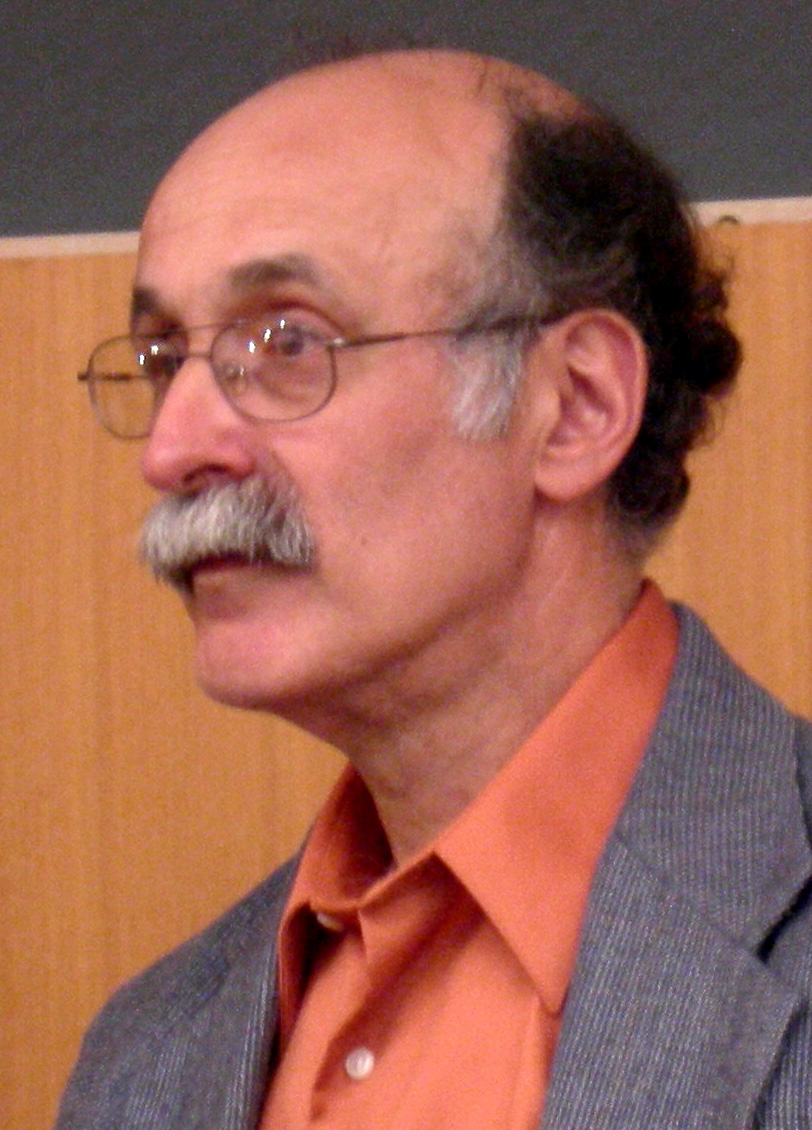
- Meeropol in 2007
- Born: Robert Rosenberg; May 14, 1947 (age 79); New York City, U.S.
- Education: Earlham College (BA); University of Michigan (MA); Western New England College School of Law (JD)
- Spouse: Ellen Meeropol
- Children: 2
- Parent: Julius and Ethel Rosenberg
- Relatives: Michael Meeropol (brother); Ivy Meeropol (niece); David Greenglass (uncle)

Robert Meeropol (born May 14, 1947 as Robert Rosenberg) is an American anthropologist, progressive activist, and author. He is the younger son of Julius and Ethel Rosenberg. Meeropol was born in New York City. His father Julius was an electrical engineer and a member of the Communist Party USA. His mother Ethel (née Greenglass), a union organizer, was also active in the Communist Party USA.

In 1953, when Robert was five years old, his parents were convicted and executed for conspiracy to commit espionage, and specifically for passing secrets of the atomic bomb to the Soviet Union.

== Early life and education ==
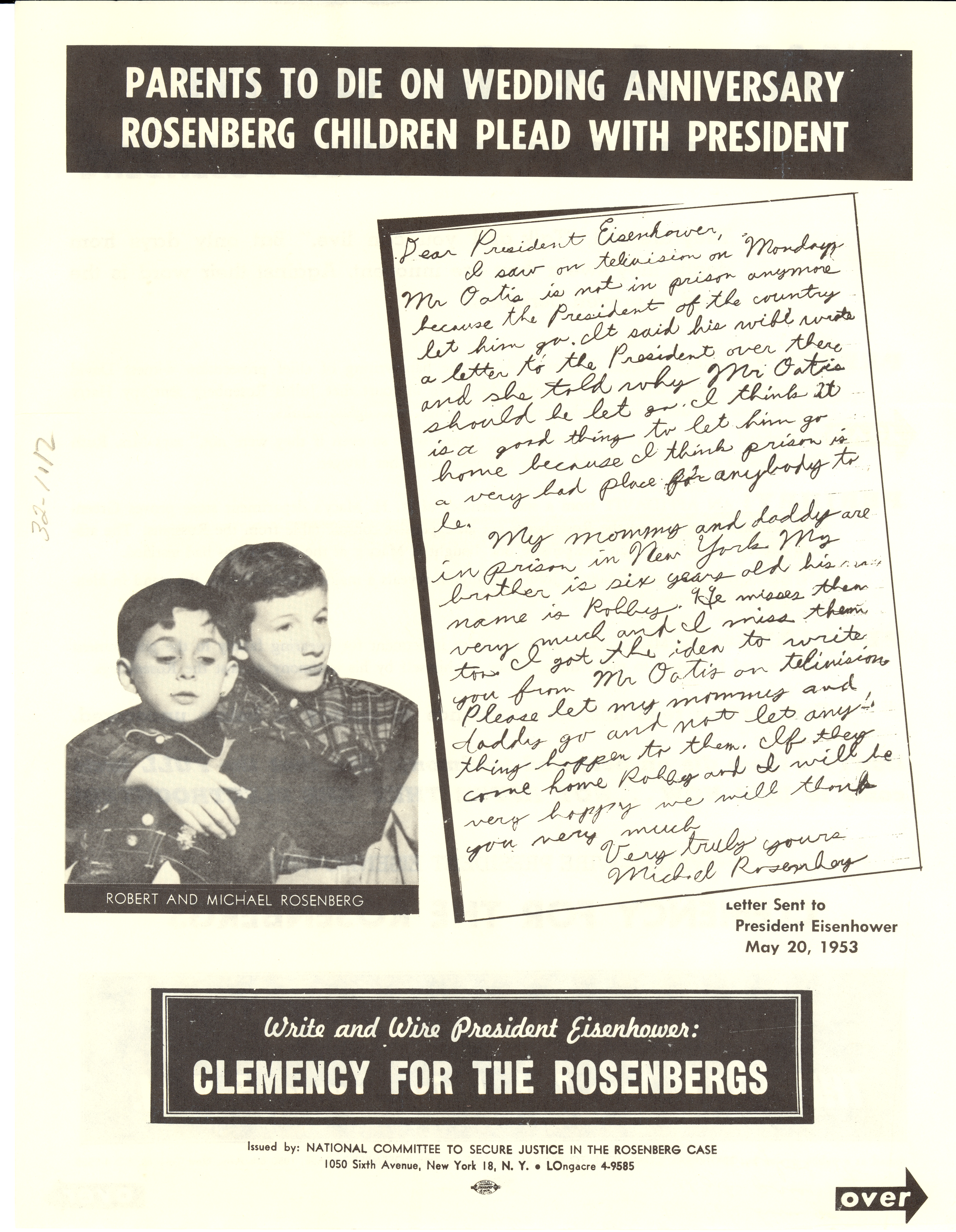
Meeropol and his brother Michael on a pamphlet issued by the National Committee to Secure Justice in the Rosenberg Case, May 1953

After the Rosenbergs were arrested, Robert and his older brother Michael lived with their maternal grandmother, Tessie Greenglass. After three months, she was unable to continue such care and placed them in the Hebrew Children's Home on 205th street in Bedford Park, Bronx. After several months, their paternal grandmother Sophie Rosenberg removed them from the children's home to care for the boys herself. During their stay with her, the boys were allowed to visit their parents in Sing Sing prison. After one year with Sophie, the boys were sent to Toms River, New Jersey to live with the Bach family, friends of the Rosenbergs. They were eventually adopted by the writer and songwriter Abel Meeropol and his wife Anne and took their last name. Meeropol has described these moves between relatives, orphanages, and foster families, and his eventual adoption by Abel and Anne Meeropol, in later essays and in his memoir.

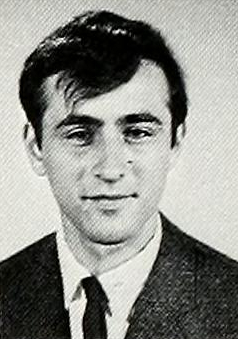
Meeropol in the Earlham College yearbook, 1967

Meeropol earned his bachelor's and master's degrees in anthropology at Earlham College and the University of Michigan.

== Activism and career ==
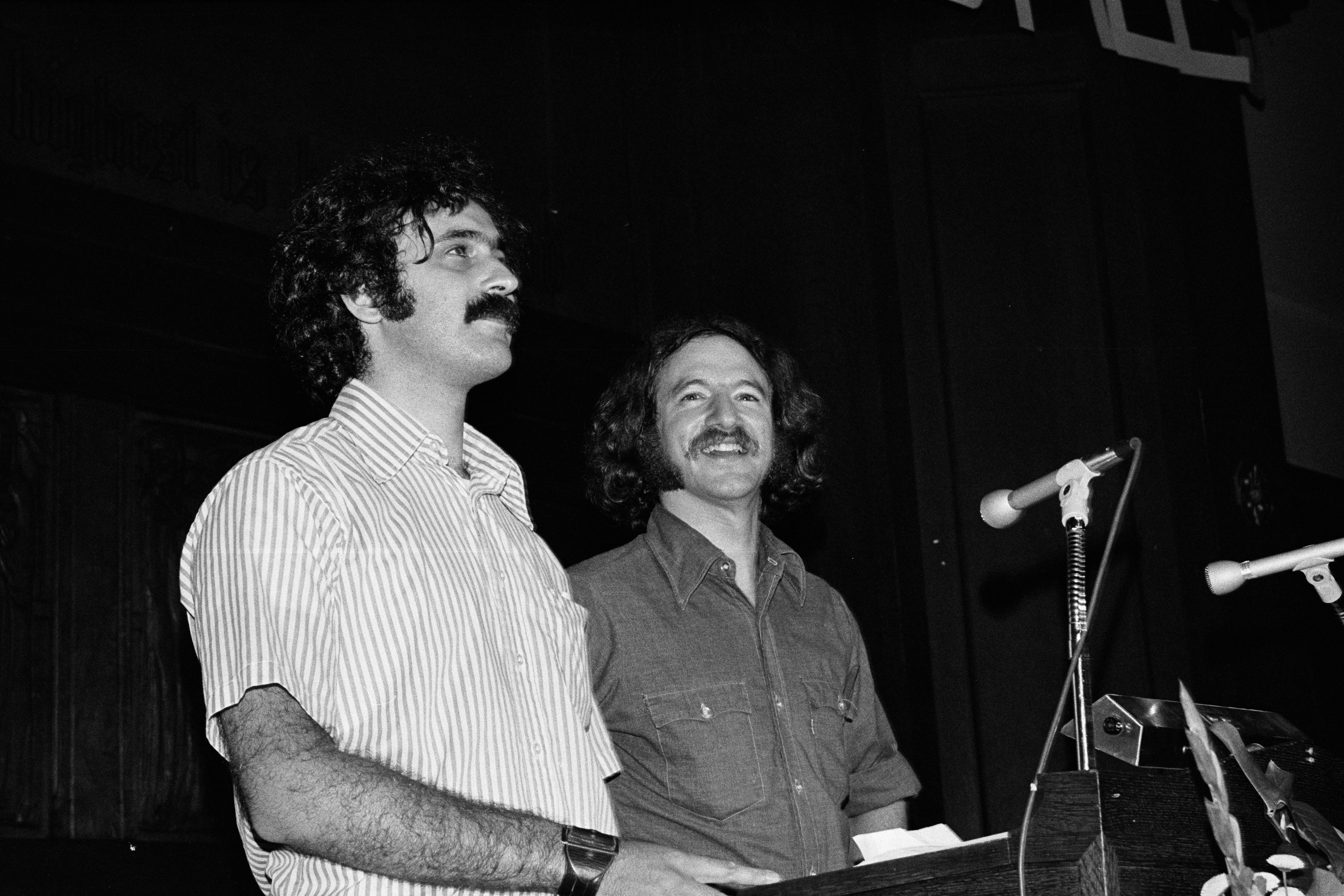
Meeropol (left) with his brother Michael at a memorial event for their parents in Manhattan, New York, June 19, 1975

In the 1960s and 1970s, Meeropol became active in the anti-war effort. After completing his master's degree, Meeropol taught anthropology at Western New England College in Springfield, Massachusetts, from 1971 to 1973.

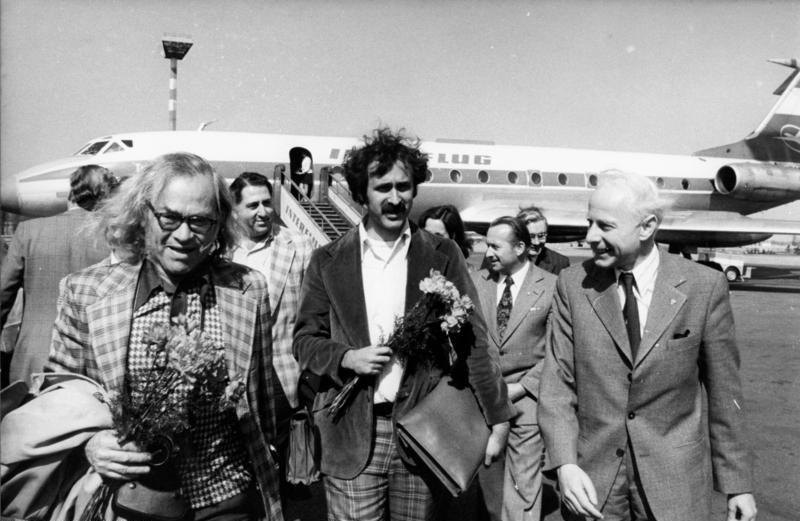
Meeropol (center) visits East Berlin, East Germany, accompanied by Morton Sobell (left), Marshall Perlin (second from left, behind) and Franz Loeser (right), April 19, 1976

With his brother, Meeropol sued the FBI and CIA under the Freedom of Information Act (FOIA), winning the release of 300,000 previously secret documents pertaining to their parents' case. Believing the documents proved their parents' innocence, the Meeropol brothers co-wrote a 1975 book about their childhood. From 1974 to 1978, he worked actively with the National Committee to Reopen the Rosenberg Case and the Fund for Open Information and Accountability.

From 1980 to 1982, he was managing editor of Socialist Review in the San Francisco Bay Area. In 1982, Meeropol moved back to Massachusetts. He returned to school, studying at the Western New England College School of Law, from which he received his J.D. degree in 1985. He was admitted to the Massachusetts Bar and began practice as an attorney.

In 1990, Meeropol started the Rosenberg Fund for Children, a public foundation which provides support for children in the U.S. whose parents are targeted, progressive activists. The RFC also supports youth in the U.S. who have been targeted for their own progressive activism. He served as its Executive Director until September 1, 2013, when he stepped down and was succeeded by his daughter Jennifer, and he continues to serve on the organization's board. As of the mid-2020s, the RFC has provided roughly $8 million in grants to support the educational and emotional needs of thousands of children and youth.

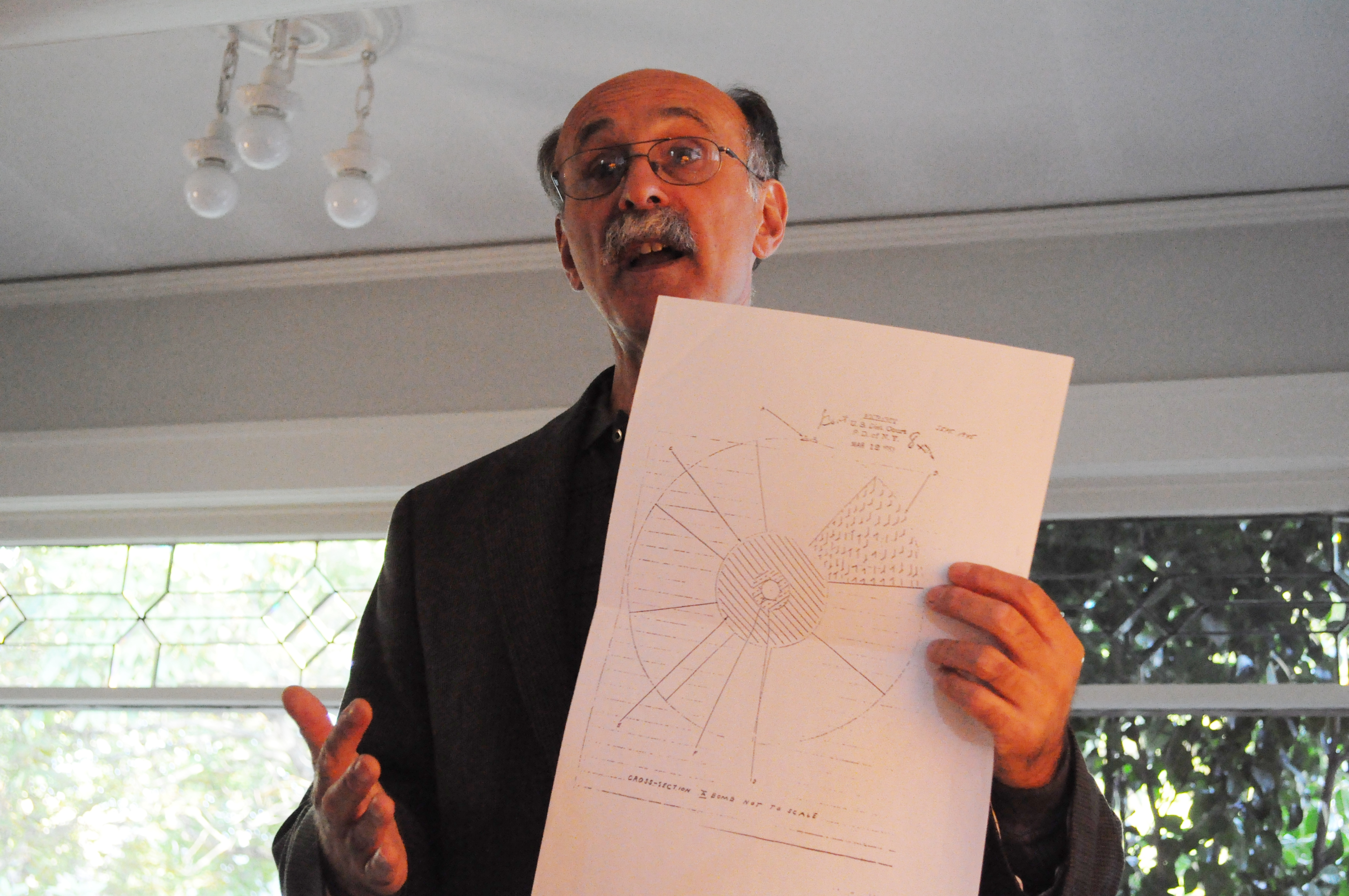
Robert Meeropol (2009) holding copy of Government Exhibit 8 from the Rosenberg trial, the cross-sectional drawing of an atomic bomb, which was said to be the "secret of the atomic bomb" the Rosenbergs had passed to the Soviet Union.

In 2003, he wrote a memoir that reflected on his life and his parents' fate. In the 2010s and 2020s, Meeropol has continued to write and speak about civil liberties, government secrecy, and his parents' case. In 2018 he published an essay in The Marshall Project connecting his childhood separation from his parents to contemporary U.S. immigration policy, and in 2023 and 2024 he co-authored articles for the online law and policy forum Just Security arguing that newly declassified U.S. documents support exonerating his mother, Ethel Rosenberg.

== Marriage and family ==
Robert is married to Ellen Meeropol. They have two daughters: Jennifer and Rachel. Rachel is a lawyer for the Center for Constitutional Rights in New York City.

== Current position on parents' executions ==
In 2008, Michael Meeropol and Robert Meeropol said that, given recent revelations by their parents' co-defendant Morton Sobell and Venona project documents released in 1995, they now believed that their father was involved in espionage for the Soviet Union. However, they also said:

"To this day, there is no credible evidence that he participated in obtaining or passing on ... the secret of the atomic bomb, the crime for which he was executed."

They also believed documents showed that witnesses had fabricated evidence against their mother, and that she was innocent of the government charges. Meeropol has since reiterated these views, while calling for full release of government records and for an official exoneration of his mother.
