= Committee for the Defense of the Revolution =

Committee for the Defense of the Revolution may refer to:

- Committees for the Defense of the Revolution, Cuba
- Committees for the Defense of the Revolution (Burkina Faso)
- Committee for the Defence of the Revolution (Ghana), see List of abbreviations in Ghana
