= Julius and Ethel Rosenberg =

American spies for the Soviet Union (d. 1953)

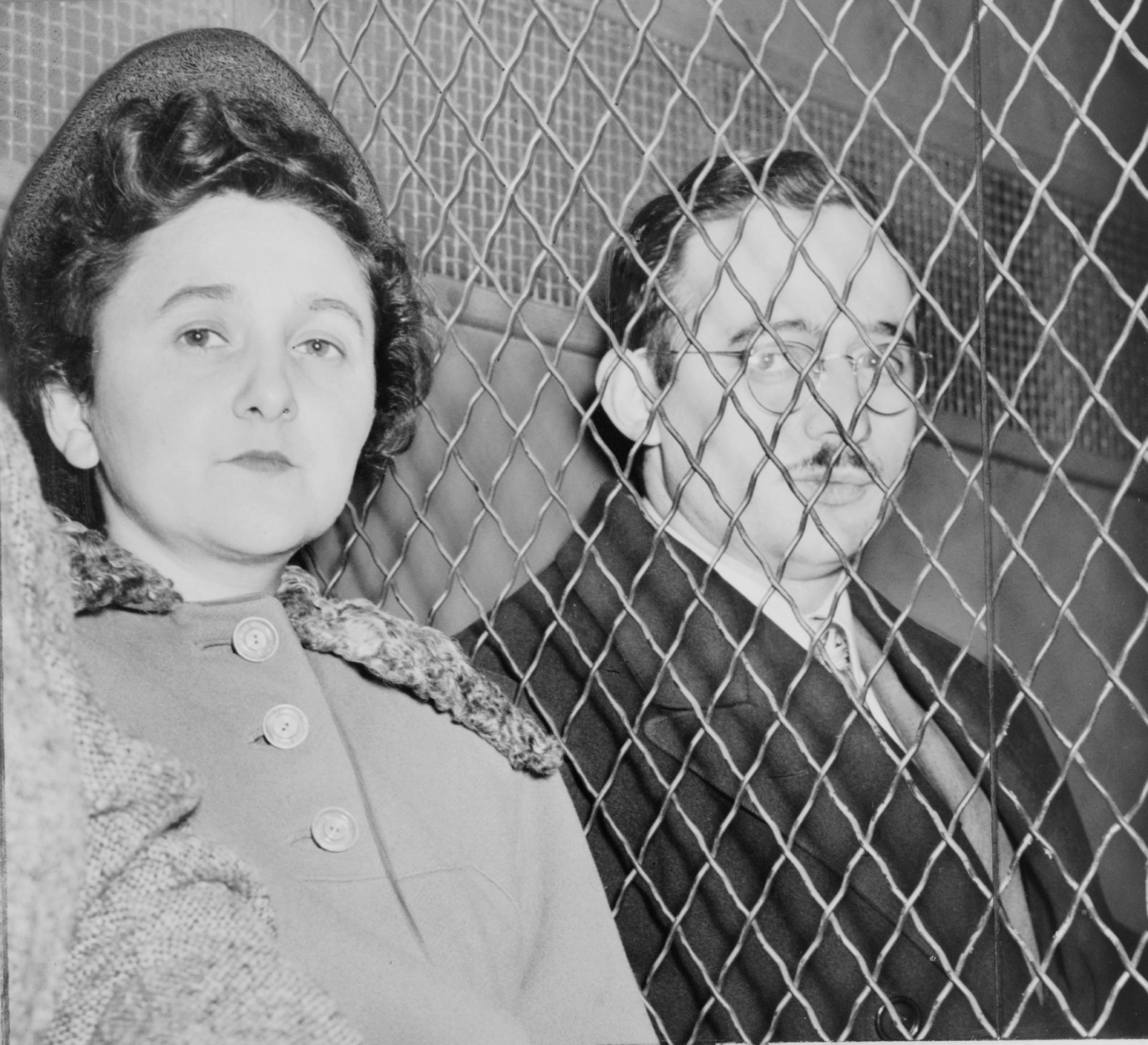
- Ethel and Julius Rosenberg in 1951
- Born: Julius Rosenberg May 12, 1918 New York City, U.S.; Ethel Greenglass September 28, 1915 New York City, U.S.
- Died: Julius June 19, 1953 (aged 35) Sing Sing Prison, New York, U.S.; Ethel June 19, 1953 (aged 37) Sing Sing Prison, New York, U.S.
- Children: Michael; Robert
- Status: Executed (June 19, 1953; 73 years ago)
- Conviction: Conspiracy to commit espionage
- Penalty: Death by electrocution

Julius Rosenberg (May 12, 1918 – June 19, 1953) and Ethel Rosenberg (née Greenglass; September 28, 1915 – June 19, 1953) were an American married couple who were convicted of spying for the Soviet Union, including providing top-secret information about American radar, sonar, jet propulsion engines, and nuclear weapon designs. They were executed by the federal government of the United States in 1953 using New York's state execution chamber in Sing Sing in Ossining, New York, becoming the first American civilians to be executed for such charges and the first to be executed during peacetime.

Other convicted co-conspirators were sentenced to prison, including Ethel's brother, David Greenglass (who had made a plea agreement), Harry Gold, and Morton Sobell. Klaus Fuchs, a German scientist working at the Los Alamos Laboratory, was convicted in the United Kingdom. For decades, many supporters—including the Rosenbergs' sons, Michael and Robert Meeropol—sought exoneration from multiple U.S. presidents. While they originally maintained that both parents were innocent, they later acknowledged Julius's involvement while continuing to maintain Ethel's innocence.

Among records the U.S. government declassified after the fall of the Soviet Union are many related to the Rosenbergs, including a trove of decoded Soviet cables (code-name Venona), which detailed Julius's role as a courier and recruiter for the Soviets. In 2008, the National Archives of the United States published most of the grand jury testimony related to the prosecution of the Rosenbergs. Freedom of Information Act (FOIA) requests filed about the Rosenbergs and the legal case against them have resulted in additional U.S. government records being made public, including formerly classified materials from U.S. intelligence agencies.

== Early lives and education ==
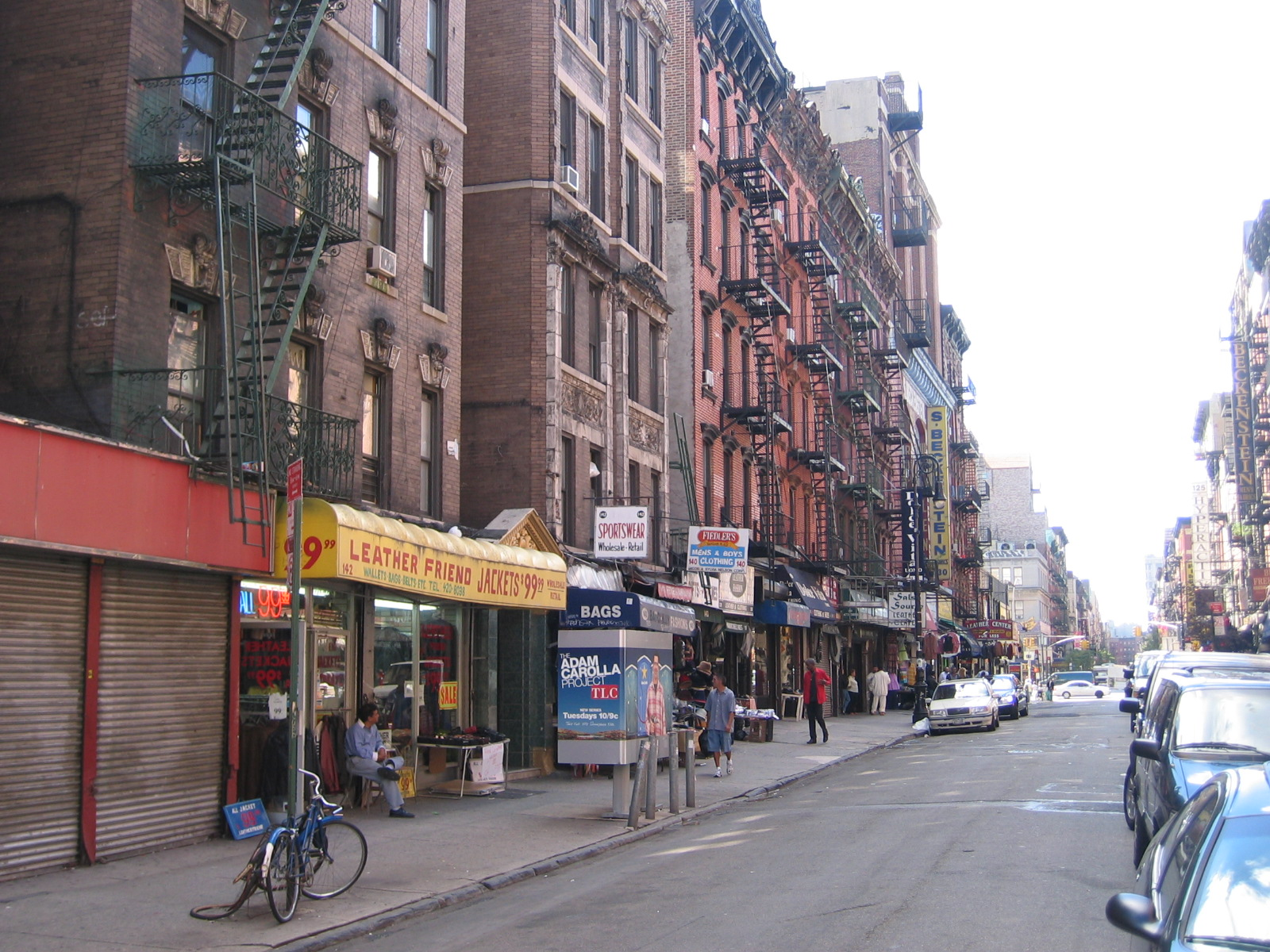
The corner of Orchard and Rivington streets, Lower East Side, 2005

Julius Rosenberg was born on May 12, 1918, in New York City to a family of Jewish immigrants from the Russian Empire. The family moved to the Lower East Side by the time Julius was 11. His parents worked in the shops of the Lower East Side as Julius attended Seward Park High School. Julius became a leader in the Young Communist League USA while at City College of New York during the Great Depression. In 1939, he graduated with a degree in electrical engineering.

Ethel Greenglass was born on September 28, 1915, to a Jewish family in Manhattan. She had a brother, David Greenglass. She originally was an aspiring actress and singer but eventually took a secretarial job at a shipping company. She became involved in labor disputes and joined the Young Communist League, where she met Julius in 1936. They married in 1939.

== Espionage ==
Julius Rosenberg joined the Army Signal Corps Engineering Laboratories at Fort Monmouth, New Jersey, in 1940, where he worked as an engineer-inspector until 1945. He was discharged when the U.S. Army discovered his previous membership in the Communist Party USA. Important research on electronics, communications, radar and guided missile controls was undertaken at Fort Monmouth during World War II.

According to a 2001 book by his former handler Aleksandr Feklisov, Rosenberg was originally recruited to spy for the interior ministry of the Soviet Union, NKVD, on Labor Day 1942 by a former spymaster, Semyon Semyonov. Rosenberg had been introduced to Semyonov by Bernard Schuster, a high-ranking member of the Communist Party USA and NKVD liaison for Earl Browder. After Semyonov was recalled to Moscow in 1944 his duties were taken over by Feklisov.

Rosenberg provided thousands of classified reports from Emerson Radio, including a complete proximity fuze. Under Feklisov's supervision, Rosenberg recruited sympathetic individuals into NKVD service, including Joel Barr, Alfred Sarant, William Perl, and Morton Sobell, also an engineer. Perl supplied Feklisov, under Rosenberg's direction, with thousands of documents from the National Advisory Committee for Aeronautics, including a complete set of design and production drawings for Lockheed's P-80 Shooting Star, the first U.S. operational jet fighter. Feklisov learned through Rosenberg that Ethel's brother David was working on the top-secret Manhattan Project at the Los Alamos National Laboratory; he directed Julius to recruit David.

In February 1944, Rosenberg succeeded in recruiting a second source of Manhattan Project information, engineer Russell McNutt, who worked on designs for the plants at Oak Ridge National Laboratory. For this success Rosenberg received a $100 bonus. McNutt's employment provided access to secrets about processes for manufacturing weapons-grade uranium.

The U.S. did not share information with, nor seek assistance from, the Soviet Union regarding the Manhattan Project. The West was shocked by the speed with which the Soviets were able to stage "Joe 1", its first nuclear test, on August 29, 1949. However, Lavrentiy Beria, the head official of the Soviet nuclear project, used foreign intelligence only as a third-party check rather than giving it directly to the design teams, whom he did not clear to know about the espionage efforts, and the development was indigenous. Considering that the pace of the Soviet program was set primarily by the amount of uranium that it could procure, it is difficult for scholars to judge accurately how much time was saved, if any.

== Rosenberg case ==
=== Arrest ===
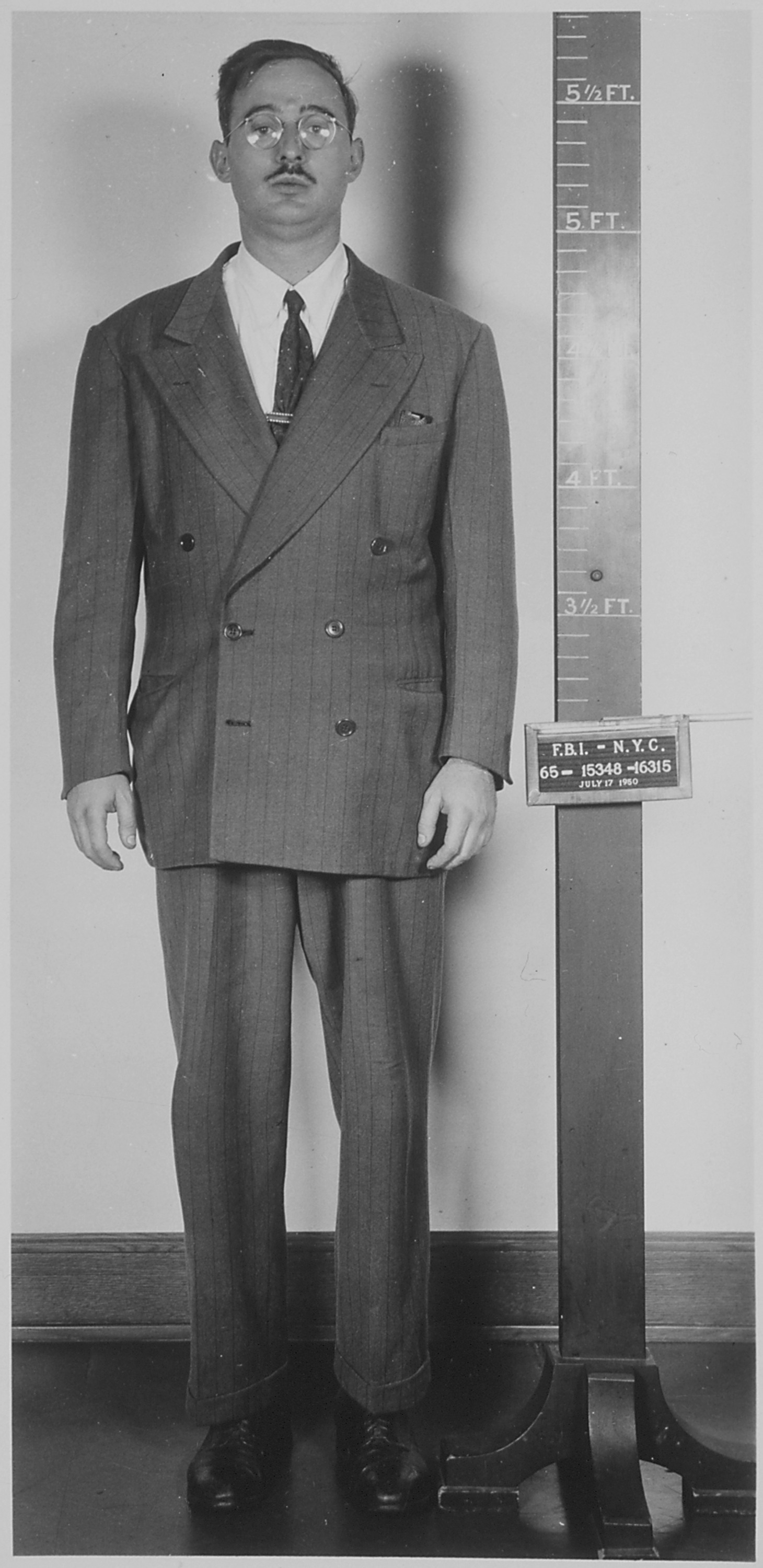
Mugshot of Julius Rosenberg

In January 1950, the U.S. discovered that Klaus Fuchs, a German refugee and theoretical physicist working for the British mission in the Manhattan Project, had given key documents to the Soviets throughout the war. Fuchs identified his courier as American Harry Gold, who was arrested on May 23, 1950.

On June 15, 1950, David Greenglass was arrested by the FBI for espionage and soon confessed to having passed secret information on to the USSR through Gold. He also claimed that Julius Rosenberg had convinced David's wife Ruth to recruit him while visiting him in Albuquerque, New Mexico, in 1944. He said Julius had passed secrets and thus linked him to the Soviet contact agent Anatoli Yakovlev. This connection would be necessary as evidence if there was to be a conviction for espionage of the Rosenbergs.

On July 17, 1950, Julius was arrested on suspicion of espionage, based on David Greenglass's confession. On August 11, 1950, Ethel was arrested after testifying before a grand jury. Another conspirator, Morton Sobell, fled with his family to Mexico City after Greenglass was arrested. They took assumed names, and he tried to figure out a way to reach Europe without a passport. Abandoning that effort, he returned to Mexico City. He claimed that he was kidnapped by members of the Mexican secret police and driven to the U.S. border, where he was arrested by U.S. forces. The U.S. government claimed Sobell was arrested by the Mexican police for bank robbery on August 16, 1950, and he was extradited the next day to the United States in Laredo, Texas.

=== Grand jury ===
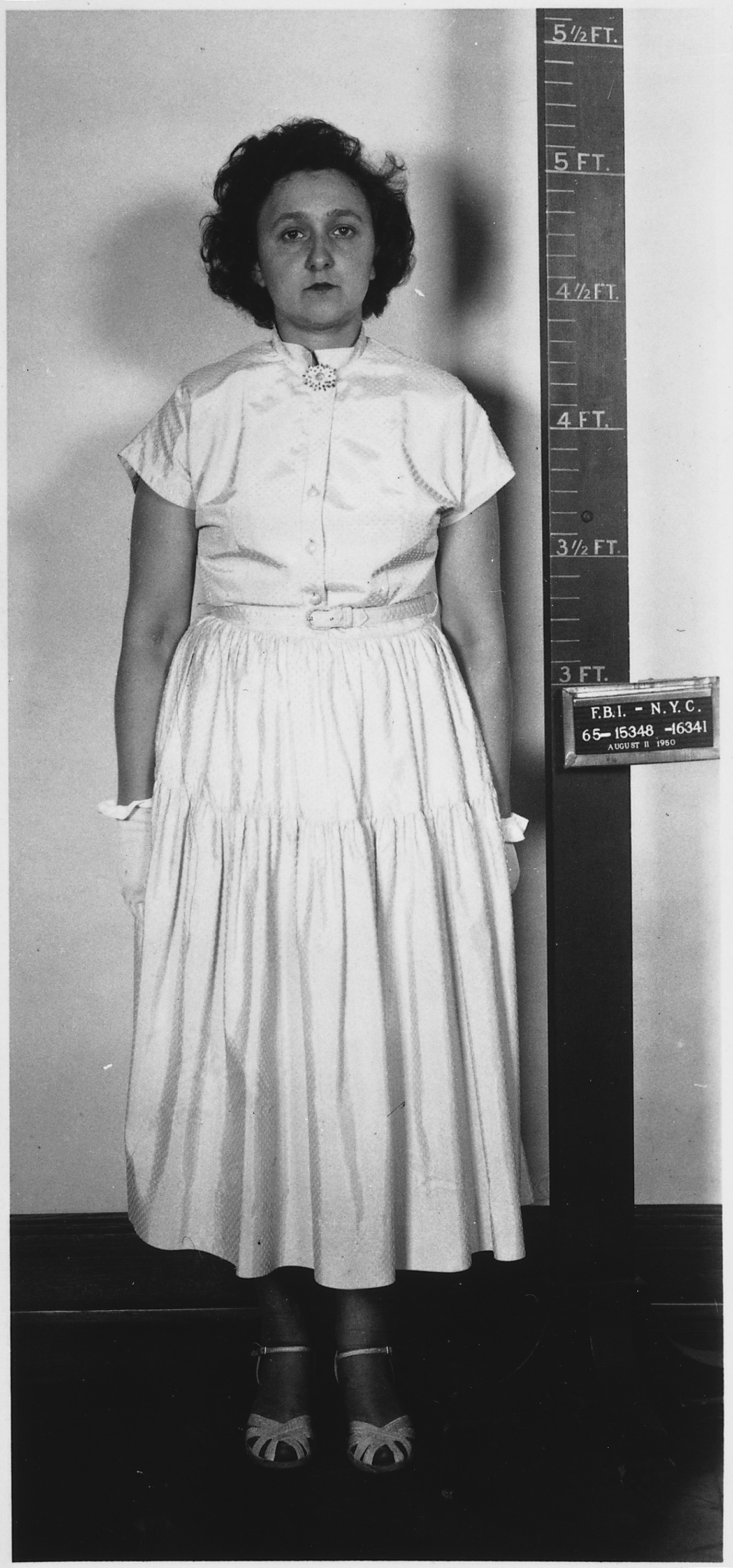
Mugshot of Ethel Rosenberg, arrested during grand jury proceedings

Twenty senior government officials met secretly on February 8, 1950, to discuss the Rosenberg case. Gordon Dean, the chairman of the Atomic Energy Commission, said: "It looks as though Rosenberg is the kingpin of a very large ring, and if there is any way of breaking him by having the shadow of a death penalty over him, we want to do it." Myles Lane, a member of the prosecution team, said that the case against Ethel was "not too strong", but that it was "very important that she be convicted too, and given a stiff sentence." FBI director J. Edgar Hoover wrote that "proceeding against the wife will serve as a lever" to make Julius talk.

Their case against Ethel was resolved 10 days before the start of the trial, when David and Ruth Greenglass were interviewed a second time. They were persuaded to change their original stories. David originally had said that he had passed the atomic data he had collected to Julius on a New York street corner. After being interviewed this second time, he said that he had given this information to Julius in the living room of the Rosenbergs' New York apartment. Ethel, at Julius's request, had taken his notes and "typed them up." In her second interview, Ruth expanded on her husband's version:

Julius then took the info into the bathroom and read it and when he came out he called Ethel and told her she had to type this information immediately ... Ethel then sat down at the typewriter which she placed on a bridge table in the living room and proceeded to type the information that David had given to Julius.

As a result of this new testimony, all charges against Ruth were dropped. On August 11, Ethel testified before a grand jury. For all questions, she asserted her right to not answer as provided by the U.S. Constitution's Fifth Amendment against self-incrimination. FBI agents took her into custody as she left the courthouse. Her attorney asked the U.S. commissioner to parole her in his custody over the weekend so that she could make arrangements for her two young children. The request was denied.

Julius and Ethel were put under pressure to incriminate others involved in the spy ring. Neither offered any further information. On August 17, the grand jury returned an indictment alleging 11 overt acts. Both Julius and Ethel Rosenberg were indicted, as were David Greenglass and Yakovlev.

=== Trial and conviction ===
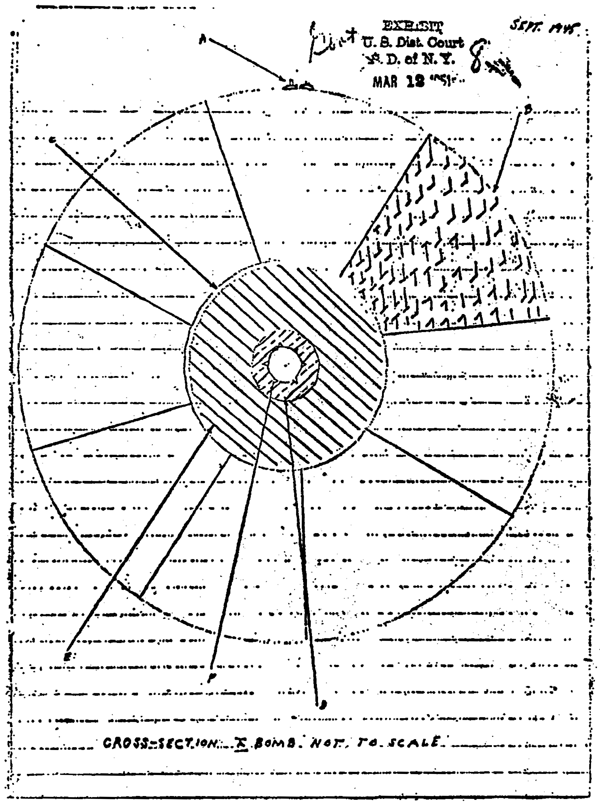
David Greenglass's sketch of an implosion-type nuclear weapon design, illustrating what he allegedly gave the Rosenbergs to pass on to the Soviet Union

The trial of the Rosenbergs and Sobell on federal espionage charges began on March 6, 1951, in the U.S. District Court for the Southern District of New York. Judge Irving Kaufman presided over the trial, with Assistant U.S. Attorney Irving Saypol leading the prosecution and criminal defense lawyer Emmanuel Bloch representing the Rosenbergs. The prosecution's primary witness, David Greenglass, said that he turned over to Julius a sketch of the cross-section of an implosion-type atom bomb. This was the "Fat Man" bomb dropped on Nagasaki, Japan, as opposed to a bomb with the "gun method" triggering device used in the "Little Boy" bomb dropped on Hiroshima.

On March 29, 1951, the Rosenbergs were convicted of espionage. They were sentenced to death on April 5 under Section 2 of the Espionage Act of 1917, which provides that anyone convicted of transmitting or attempting to transmit to a foreign government "information relating to the national defense" may be imprisoned for life or put to death.

Prosecutor Roy Cohn later claimed that his influence led to both Kaufman and Saypol being appointed to the Rosenberg case and that Kaufman imposed the death penalty based on Cohn's personal recommendation. Cohn would go on later to work for Senator Joseph McCarthy, appointed as chief counsel to the investigations subcommittee during McCarthy's tenure as chairman of the Senate Government Operations Committee. In imposing the death penalty, Kaufman observed that he held the Rosenbergs responsible not only for espionage but for American deaths in the Korean War:

I believe your conduct in putting into the hands of the Russians the A-bomb years before our best scientists predicted Russia would perfect the bomb has already caused, in my opinion, the Communist aggression in Korea, with the resultant casualties exceeding 50,000 and who knows but that millions more of innocent people may pay the price of your treason. Indeed, by your betrayal you undoubtedly have altered the course of history to the disadvantage of our country.

The U.S. government offered to spare the lives of both Julius and Ethel if Julius provided the names of other spies and they admitted their guilt. The Rosenbergs made a public statement: "By asking us to repudiate the truth of our innocence, the government admits its own doubts concerning our guilt... we will not be coerced, even under pain of death, to bear false witness."

== After conviction ==
=== Campaign for clemency ===
After the publication of an investigative series in the National Guardian and the formation of the National Committee to Secure Justice in the Rosenberg Case, some Americans came to believe both Rosenbergs were innocent or had received too harsh a sentence, particularly Ethel. A campaign was started to try to prevent the couple's execution. Between the trial and the executions, there were widespread protests and claims of antisemitism. At a time when American fears about communism were high, the Rosenbergs did not receive support from mainstream Jewish organizations. The American Civil Liberties Union did not find any civil liberties violations in the case.

Across the world, especially in Western European capitals, there were numerous protests with picketing and demonstrations in favor of the Rosenbergs, along with editorials in otherwise pro-American newspapers. Marxist Jean-Paul Sartre, an existentialist philosopher and writer who won the Nobel Prize for Literature, described the trial as "a legal lynching". Others, including non-communists such as Jean Cocteau and Harold Urey, a Nobel Prize-winning physical chemist, as well as left-leaning figures such as Nelson Algren, Bertolt Brecht, Albert Einstein, Dashiell Hammett, Frida Kahlo, and Diego Rivera (some of whom were communist), protested the position of the American government in what the French termed the American Dreyfus affair.

Einstein and Urey pleaded with President Harry S. Truman to pardon the Rosenbergs. In May 1951, Pablo Picasso wrote for the communist French newspaper L'Humanité: "The hours count. The minutes count. Do not let this crime against humanity take place." The all-black labor union International Longshoremen's Association Local 968 stopped working for a day in protest. Cinema artists such as Fritz Lang registered their protest. President Dwight D. Eisenhower, supported by public opinion and the media at home, ignored the overseas demands. Pope Pius XII appealed to Eisenhower to spare the couple, but Eisenhower refused on February 11, 1953. All other appeals were also unsuccessful.

Defense of the Rosenbergs surged in November and December 1952 and was organized by the Communist Party of the Soviet Union—confirmation of which occurred with the publication of KGB documents obtained by Alexander Vassiliev in 2011. Proponents of clemency argued that the Rosenbergs were actually "innocent Jewish peace activists". According to American historian Ronald Radosh, the Soviet Union's goal was "to deflect the world's attention from the sordid execution of the innocent [Jewish Slánský trial defendants] in Soviet-controlled Czechoslovakia.

=== Execution ===
The execution was delayed from the scheduled date of June 18 because Supreme Court Associate Justice William O. Douglas had granted a stay of execution on the previous day. This stay resulted from intervention in the case by Fyke Farmer, a Tennessee lawyer whose efforts had been scorned by Bloch. The execution was scheduled for 11 p.m. the evening of June 19, during the Sabbath, which begins and ends around sunset.

Bloch asked for more time, filing a complaint that execution on the Sabbath offended the defendants' Jewish heritage. Rhoda Laks, another attorney on the Rosenbergs' defense team, also made this argument before Judge Kaufman. The defense's strategy backfired. Kaufman, who stated his concerns about executing the Rosenbergs on the Sabbath, rescheduled the execution for 8 p.m.—before sunset and the Sabbath—the regular time for executions at Sing Sing where they were being held.

On June 19, 1953, Julius died from the first electric shock. Ethel's execution did not go smoothly. After she was given the normal course of three electric shocks, attendants removed the strapping and other equipment only to have doctors determine that her heart was still beating. Two more electric shocks were applied, and at the conclusion eyewitnesses reported that smoke rose from her head. The Rosenbergs were the only American civilians executed for espionage during the Cold War. The funeral services were held in Brooklyn on June 21. The Rosenbergs are buried at Wellwood Cemetery, a Jewish cemetery in Pinelawn, New York. The Times reported that 500 people attended and some 10,000 stood outside:

The bodies had been brought from Sing Sing prison by the national "Rosenberg committee" which undertook the funeral arrangements, and an all-night vigil was held in one of the largest mortuary chapels in Brooklyn. Many hundreds of people filed past the biers. Most of them clearly regarded the Rosenbergs as martyred heroes and more than 500 mourners attended to-day's services, while a crowd estimated at 10,000 stood outside in burning heat. Mr. Bloch [their counsel], who delivered one of the main orations, bitterly exclaimed that America was "living under the heel of a military dictator garbed in civilian attire": the Rosenbergs were "Sweet. Tender. And Intelligent" and the course they took was one of "courage and heroism."

In 1953, W. E. B. Du Bois wrote a poem titled "The Rosenbergs", which began "Crucify us, Vengeance of God, as we crucify two more Jews" and ended "Who has been crowned on yonder stair? Red Resurrection? Or Black Despair?"

== Soviet nuclear program ==
Senator Daniel Patrick Moynihan, vice-chairman of the Senate Select Committee on Intelligence, investigated how much the Soviet spy ring helped the USSR to build its bomb. Moynihan found that in 1945 physicist Hans Bethe estimated that the Soviets would build its bomb within five years. Moynihan wrote in his book Secrecy: "Thanks to information provided by their agents, they did it in four."

Nikita Khrushchev, leader of the Soviet Union from 1953 to 1964, wrote in his posthumously published memoir that he "cannot specifically say what kind of help the Rosenbergs provided us" but that he learned from Joseph Stalin and Vyacheslav Molotov that they "had provided very significant help in accelerating the production of our atomic bomb." Boris V. Brokhovich, the engineer who later became director of Chelyabinsk-40, the plutonium production reactor and extraction facility that the Soviet Union used to create its first bomb material, alleged that Khrushchev was a "silly fool". He said the Soviets had developed their own bomb by trial and error. He stated: "You sat the Rosenbergs in the electric chair for nothing. We got nothing from the Rosenbergs."

The notes allegedly typed by Ethel apparently contained little that was directly used in the Soviet atomic bomb project. According to Julius's contact Feklisov, the Rosenbergs did not provide the Soviet Union with any useful material about the atomic bomb: "He [Julius] didn't understand anything about the atomic bomb and he couldn't help us."

General Leslie Groves, who developed the American nuclear program as part of the Manhattan Project, said during a United States Atomic Energy Commission hearing on Robert Oppenheimer that he thought that "the data that went out in the case of the Rosenbergs was of minor value", and that he "always felt the effects were greatly exaggerated, that the Russians did not get too much information out of it". Groves requested that this "should be kept very quiet" as he still believed the Rosenbergs deserved to die. This part of his testimony was redacted from the publicly released 1954 transcript of the Commission's hearing on Oppenheimer and remained classified until 2014.

== Later developments ==
=== 1995 Venona decryptions ===
The Venona project was a United States counterintelligence program to decrypt messages transmitted by the intelligence agencies of the Soviet Union. Initiated when the Soviet Union was an ally of the U.S., the program continued during the Cold War when it was considered an enemy. The Venona messages did not feature in the Rosenbergs' trial, which relied instead on testimony from their collaborators, but they heavily informed the U.S. government's overall approach to investigating and prosecuting domestic communists.

In 1995, the U.S. government made public many documents decoded by the Venona project, showing Julius Rosenberg's role as part of a productive ring of spies. For example, a 1944 cable (which gives the name of Ruth Greenglass in clear text) says that Ruth's husband David is being recruited as a spy by his sister (that is, Ethel Rosenberg) and her husband. The cable also makes clear that the sister's husband is involved enough in espionage to have his own codename ("Antenna" and later "Liberal"). Ethel did not have a codename; however, KGB messages which were contained in the Venona project's Alexander Vassiliev files, and which were not made public until 2009, revealed that both Ethel and Julius had regular contact with at least two KGB agents and were active in recruiting both David Greenglass and Russell McNutt.

=== 2001 David Greenglass statements ===
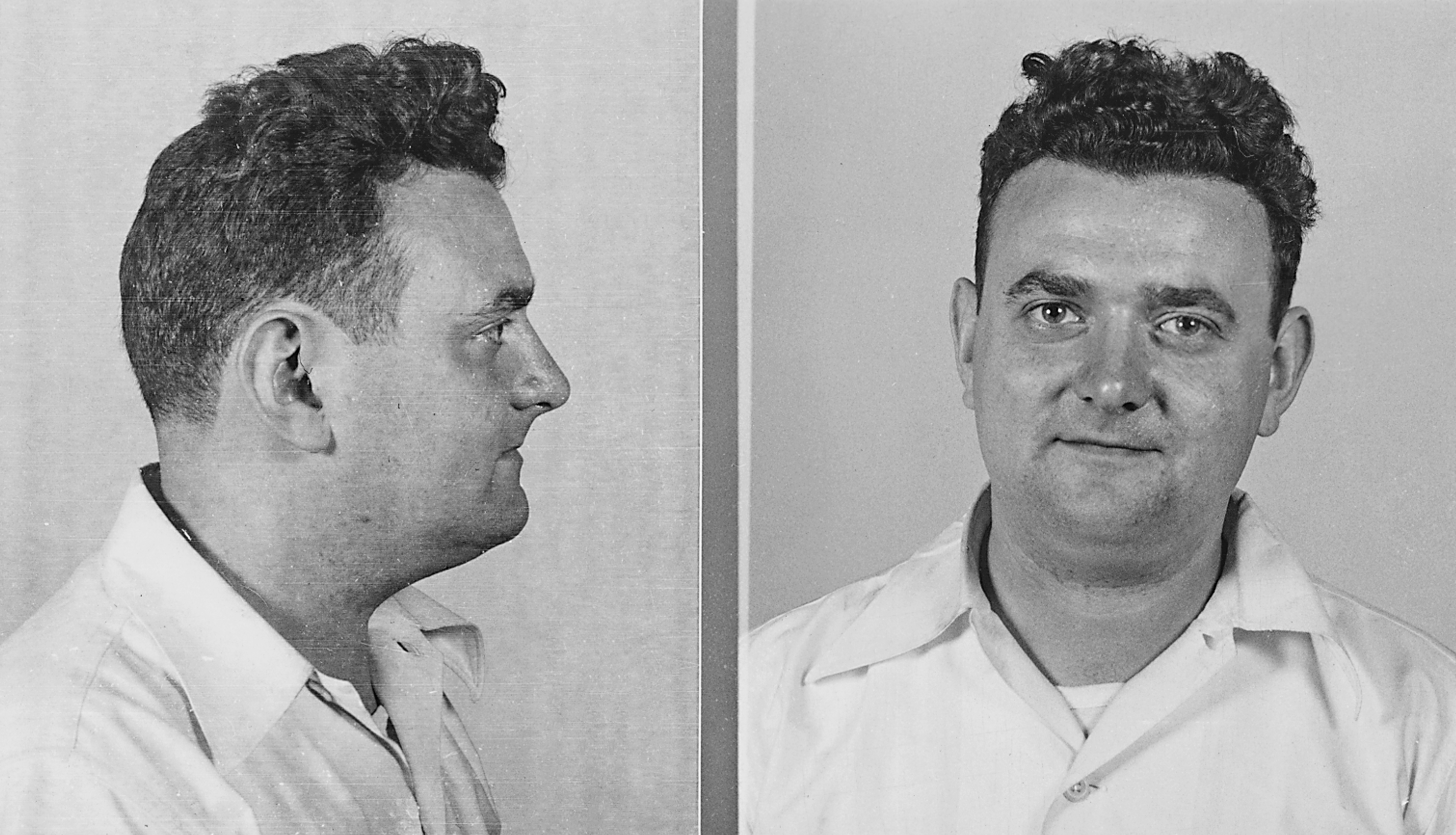
Mugshot of David Greenglass, brother of Ethel Greenglass Rosenberg and key prosecution witness

In 2001, David Greenglass recanted his testimony about his sister having typed the notes. He said "I frankly think my wife did the typing, but I don't remember." He said he gave false testimony to protect himself and his wife and that he was encouraged by the prosecution to do so. "My wife is more important to me than my sister. Or my mother or my father, OK? And she was the mother of my children." He refused to express remorse for his decision to betray his sister, saying only that he did not realize that the prosecution would push for the death penalty. He stated, "I would not sacrifice my wife and my children for my sister."

=== 2008 release of grand jury testimony ===
At the grand jury, Ruth Greenglass was asked, "Didn't you write [the information] down on a piece of paper?" She replied, "Yes, I wrote [the information] down on a piece of paper and [Julius Rosenberg] took it with him." At the trial, she testified that Ethel typed notes about the atomic bomb. Numerous articles were published in 2008 related to the Rosenberg case. Deputy Attorney General of the United States William P. Rogers, who had been part of the prosecution of the Rosenbergs, discussed their strategy at the time in relation to seeking the death sentence for Ethel. He said they had urged the death sentence for Ethel in an effort to extract a full confession from Julius. He reportedly said "she called our bluff" as she made no effort to push her husband to any action.

=== 2008 Morton Sobell's statements ===
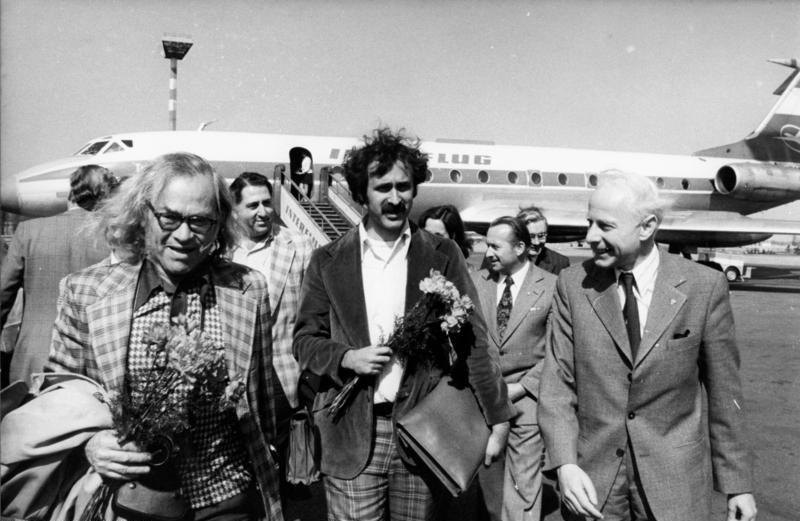
Morton Sobell (left), Marshall Perlin, Robert Meeropol, Franz Loeser, April 19, 1976

In September 2008, Morton Sobell was interviewed by The New York Times after the revelations from grand jury testimony. He admitted that he had given documents to the Soviet contact but said these had to do with defensive radar and weaponry. He confirmed that Julius Rosenberg was "in a conspiracy that delivered to the Soviets classified military and industrial information ... [on] the atomic bomb", and "[Julius] never told me about anything else that he was engaged in."

In a New York Times article, Sobell was paraphrased as saying that he thought the hand-drawn diagrams and other atomic-bomb details acquired by Greenglass and passed to Julius were of "little value" to the Soviet Union and were used only to corroborate what they had learned "from other moles." He also said that he believed Ethel Rosenberg was aware of her husband's deeds but took no part in them. In a follow-up letter to The New York Times, one week after the first interview was published, Sobell denied that he knew anything about Julius Rosenberg's alleged atomic espionage activities, and that the only thing he knew for sure was what he himself did in association with Julius Rosenberg.

=== 2009 Vassiliev notebooks based on KGB archives ===
In 2009, extensive notes collected from KGB archives were made public in a book published by Yale University Press: Spies: The Rise and Fall of the KGB in America, written by John Earl Haynes, Harvey Klehr, and Alexander Vassiliev. Vassiliev's notebooks included KGB comments concerning Julius and Ethel Rosenberg, and make clear that the KGB considered Julius Rosenberg an effective agent and Ethel a supporter of his work.

According to Vassiliev, Julius and Ethel worked personally with KGB agents who were given the codenames Twain and Callistratus, and were described as being the ones who recruited Greenglass and McNutt for the Manhattan Project spy mission. Although the public release of Vassiliev's notebooks did not occur until 2009, the notebooks had been originally intercepted during the Venona decryptions.

=== Rosenberg children ===
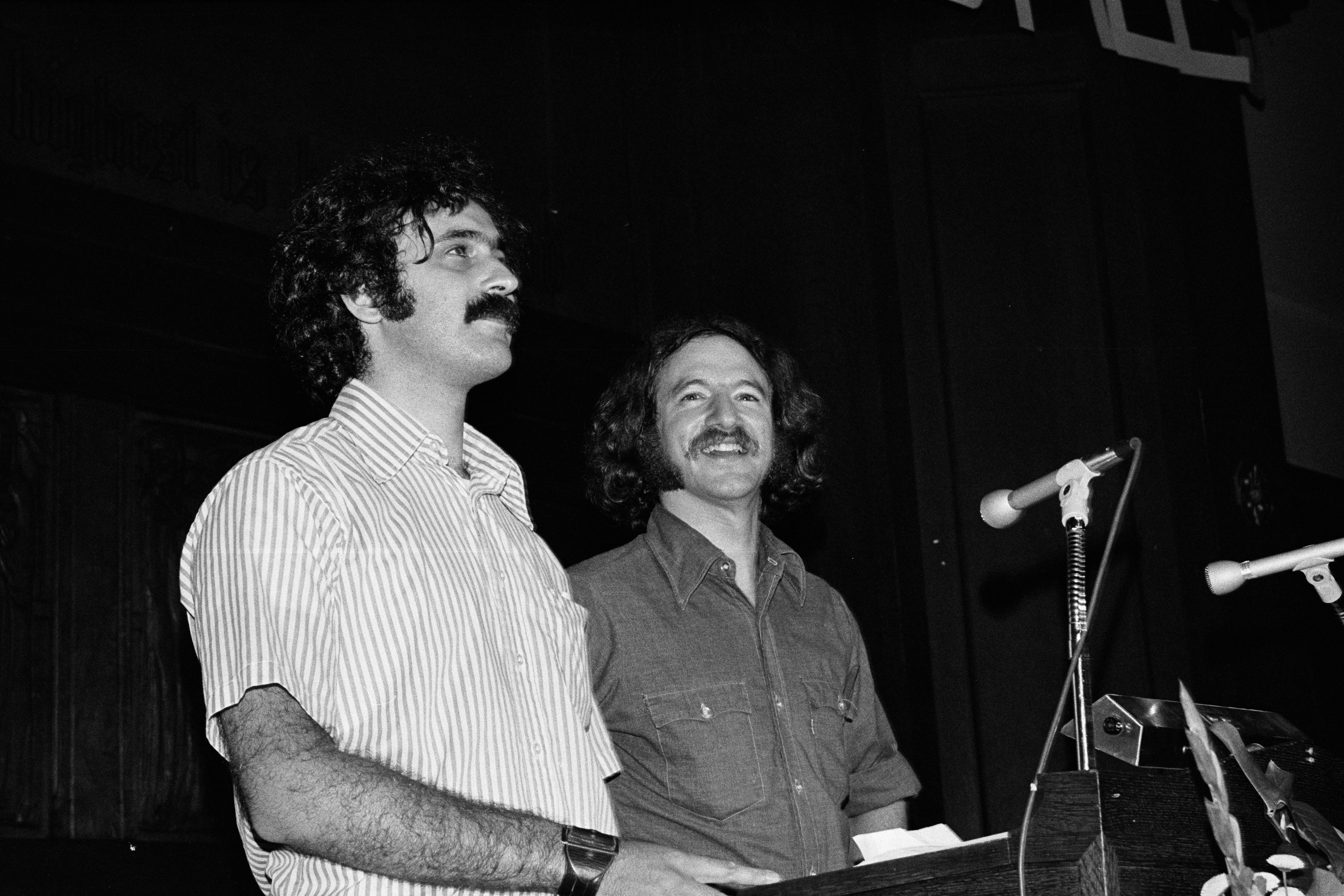
Robert (left) and Michael Meeropol at a memorial event for their parents in Manhattan, New York, June 19, 1975

The Rosenbergs' two sons, Michael and Robert, spent years trying to prove the innocence of their parents. They were orphaned by the executions and were not adopted by their many aunts or uncles, although they initially spent time under the care of their grandmothers and in a children's home. They were adopted by the communist activist Abel Meeropol and his wife Anne and assumed the Meeropol surname. After Sobell's 2008 confession, they acknowledged their father had been involved in espionage but that in their view the case was riddled with prosecutorial and judicial misconduct, that their mother was convicted on flimsy evidence to place leverage on her husband, and that neither deserved the death penalty.

Michael and Robert co-wrote a book about their and their parents' lives, We Are Your Sons: The Legacy of Ethel and Julius Rosenberg (1975). Robert wrote the memoir An Execution in the Family: One Son's Journey (2003). In 1990, he founded the Rosenberg Fund for Children, a nonprofit foundation that provides support for children of targeted liberal activists and youth who are targeted as activists.

Michael's daughter Ivy Meeropol directed a 2004 documentary about her grandparents, Heir to an Execution, which was featured at the Sundance Film Festival. Their sons' current position is that Julius was legally guilty of the conspiracy charge, although not of atomic spying, while Ethel was only generally aware of his activities. The children say that their father did not deserve the death penalty and that their mother was wrongly convicted. They continue to campaign for Ethel to be posthumously legally exonerated.

In 2015, following the most recent grand jury transcript release, Michael and Robert Meeropol called on U.S. President Barack Obama's administration to acknowledge that Ethel Rosenberg's conviction and execution was wrongful and to issue a proclamation exonerating her, though her innocence is still not proven. In March 2016, Michael and Robert (via the Rosenberg Fund for Children) launched a petition campaign calling on President Obama and U.S. Attorney General Loretta Lynch to formally exonerate Ethel Rosenberg.

In October 2016, both Michael and Robert Meeropol spoke with Anderson Cooper in an interview which aired on 60 Minutes. In January 2017, Senator Elizabeth Warren sent Obama a letter requesting consideration of the exoneration request. In 2021, Ethel's sons restarted the campaign to pardon Ethel as they were optimistic that President Joe Biden would consider this favorably. Ethel Rosenberg: A Cold War Tragedy by Anne Sebba was published by Orion Books in 2021. As of June 2023 Michael and Robert were requesting Director of National Intelligence Avril Haines to release the records related to their mother's case, per a 2009 executive order.

In 2024, the Meeropols were given a copy of a contemporary hand-written memo by Meredith Gardner, a linguist and codebreaker at what later became the NSA, based on Russian decrypts. It claimed that Ethel Rosenberg knew about Julius' espionage work but that "due to ill health she did not engage in the work herself".

== Artistic representations ==
The song "Julius and Ethel" written by Bob Dylan in 1983 is based on the Rosenberg case.

Images of the Rosenbergs are engraved on a memorial in Havana, Cuba. The accompanying caption says they were murdered.

Pakistani poet Faiz Ahmad Faiz dedicated a poem to Julius and Ethel Rosenberg. Its title in Urdu is "Ham Jo Taareek Raahon Mein Maare Gaye" (Urdu: ہم جو تاریک راہوں میں مارے گئے, romanized: Ham Jō Tārīk Rāhō̃ Mē̃ Mārē Gaē, lit. 'We who were killed on dark and uncertain paths').

Turkish poet Melih Cevdet Anday also dedicated a poem in Turkish, "Anı" ("Memory"), to the Rosenbergs.

The Book of Daniel, a novel by E.L. Doctorow, is loosely based on the trial and execution of the Rosenbergs.

Sylvia Plath opened her 1963 novel The Bell Jar with a reference to the Rosenbergs' execution: "It was a queer, sultry summer, the summer they electrocuted the Rosenbergs...". The novel comes back to the topic several times.

Artist Pablo Picasso presented the Rosenberg's sons Michael and Robert with a pen and ink drawing of their parents. It is featured on the back cover of the first edition (1975) book, The Unquiet Death of Julius & Ethel Rosenberg by Alvin H. Gooldstein.

== See also ==
- Atomic spies
- Capital punishment by the United States government
- List of people executed by the United States federal government
- List of people executed in the United States in 1953
- List of people executed by electrocution
- McCarthyism and antisemitism
- Soviet atomic bomb project

== Works cited ==
- Feklisov, Aleksandr, and Kostin, Sergei. The Man Behind the Rosenbergs. Enigma Books, 2003. ISBN 978-1-929631-24-7
- Radosh, Ronald (2012). "A Tale of Two Trials: Soviet Propaganda at Home and Abroad". World Affairs. 175 (1): 80–87. ISSN 0043-8200. JSTOR 41638995.
- Roberts, Sam. The Brother: The Untold Story of the Rosenberg Case. Random House, 2001. ISBN 0-375-76124-1.
- Schneir, Walter, and Scheir, Miriam. Invitation to an Inquest. Pantheon Books, 1983. ISBN 0-394-71496-2.
- Schrecker, Ellen. Many Are the Crimes: McCarthyism in America. Little, Brown and Company, 1998. ISBN 0-316-77470-7.
