= Abel Meeropol =

American songwriter and poet (1903–1986)

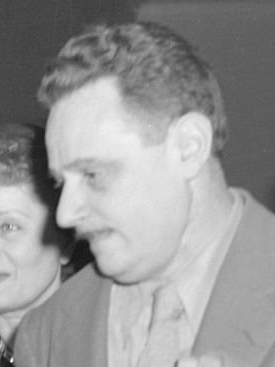
- Meeropol in 1954
- Born: February 10, 1903; New York City, U.S.
- Died: October 29, 1986 (aged 83); Longmeadow, Massachusetts, U.S.
- Other name: Lewis Allan
- Occupations: Actor, songwriter
- Known for: "Strange Fruit" "The House I Live In"
- Spouse: Anne Shaffer (m. 1931; died 1973)

Abel Meeropol (February 10, 1903 – October 29, 1986) was an American songwriter and poet whose works were published under his pseudonym Lewis Allan. He wrote the poem and musical setting of "Strange Fruit" (1937), which was recorded by Billie Holiday.

== Early life and education ==
Meeropol was born in 1903 to Ukrainian-Jewish immigrants in the Bronx, New York. He graduated from DeWitt Clinton High School in 1921 (his classmate Countee Cullen graduated in 1922) and earned a B.A. from City College of New York and an M.A. from Harvard University. Meeropol taught English at DeWitt Clinton for 17 years. During his tenure as a high school teacher, Meeropol taught author and racial justice advocate James Baldwin.

== Song writing and poetry ==
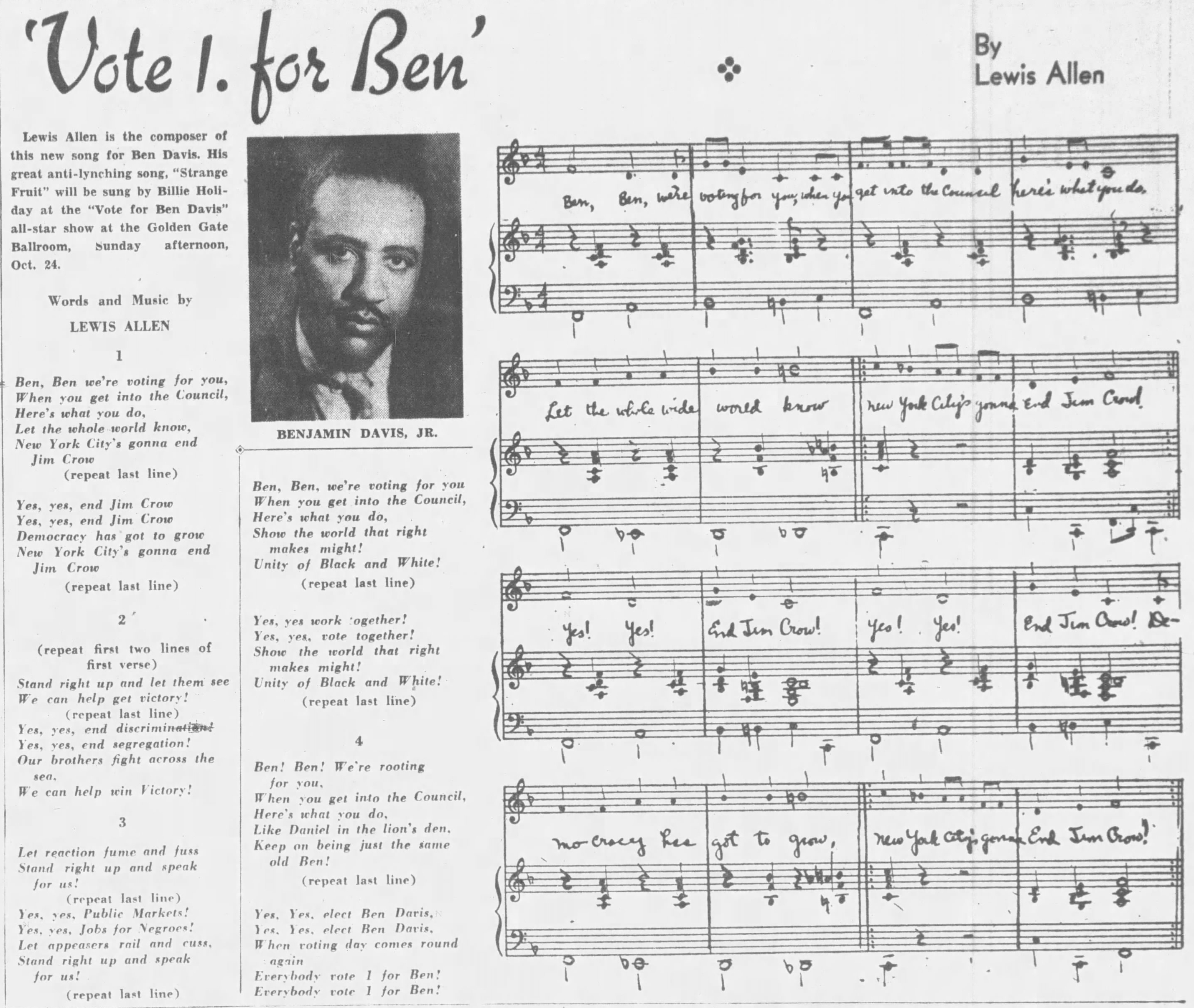
The sheet music for 'Vote I. for Ben', written for Communist New York City Council candidate Benjamin J. Davis Jr., 1943

Meeropol wrote the anti-lynching poem "Strange Fruit" (1937), first published as "Bitter Fruit" in a teacher union publication. He later set it to music. The song was recorded and performed by Billie Holiday and Nina Simone. Holiday states in the autobiographical book Lady Sings the Blues that she co-wrote the music to the song with Meeropol and Sonny White. The writers David Margolick and Hilton Als dismissed that claim in their work Strange Fruit: The Biography of a Song, writing that hers was "an account that may set a record for most misinformation per column inch". When challenged, Holiday—whose autobiography had been ghostwritten by William Dufty—claimed, "I ain't never read that book." Meeropol wrote numerous other poems and songs, including the Frank Sinatra and Josh White hit "The House I Live In". He also wrote the libretto of Robert Kurka's opera The Good Soldier Schweik, which was premiered in 1958 by the New York City Opera.

According to his adopted son Robert Meeropol, the songs "Strange Fruit" and "The House I Live In", along with the Peggy Lee hit "Apples, Peaches and Cherries", provided most of the royalty income of the family. "Apples, Peaches and Cherries" was translated into French by Sacha Distel and became a number one hit in France under the title "Scoubidou". Meeropol filed a copyright infringement lawsuit over Distel's plagiarism as Distel initially had claimed the song as his. After the case was settled, Meeropol started receiving the royalties.

Meeropol published his work under the pseudonym of "Lewis Allan" in memory of the names of his two stillborn children.

== Personal life ==
Meeropol was a member of the American Communist Party from 1932 to 1947. He was sympathetic to Julius and Ethel Rosenberg, who were convicted and executed for espionage. Later, Meeropol and his wife, Anne, adopted the Rosenbergs' two sons, Michael and Robert, who were orphaned after their parents' executions. Both children took the surname "Meeropol".

== Death ==
Meeropol died on October 30, 1986, at the Jewish Nursing Home in Longmeadow, Massachusetts; he was 83 years old.
