= Arthur Kinoy =

American attorney and civil rights leader (1920-2003)

Arthur Kinoy (September 20, 1920 – September 19, 2003) was an American attorney and progressive civil rights leader who helped defend Ethel and Julius Rosenberg. He served as a professor of law at the Rutgers School of Law–Newark from 1964 to 1999. He was one of the founders in 1966 of the Center for Constitutional Rights in New York City, and successfully argued a number of cases before the Supreme Court of the United States. He also founded the Public Interest Law Center of New Jersey.

== Education ==
Kinoy was born on September 20, 1920, in New York City. He attended public schools and Harvard University (A.B., 1941), where he graduated magna cum laude. As a student at Harvard, Kinoy was a member of the national executive committee of the American Student Union. He earned his law degree at Columbia University (LL.B., 1947), where he was executive editor of the law review.

== Career as attorney ==
Kinoy was attorney for the United Electrical, Radio and Machine Workers of America (UE), classified in the 1950s as a Communist-controlled union by the Senate Internal Security Subcommittee (SISS), headed by conservative Democratic Sen. James O. Eastland from Mississippi.

Kinoy took an active part in the defense of Ethel and Julius Rosenberg from 1951. They were convicted of atomic espionage and executed on June 19, 1953. Kinoy made the last appeal to try to save the Rosenbergs from execution.

In the 1950s, Kinoy was a partner in the law firm of Donner, Kinoy & Perlin. Among their clients were left-wing groups such as the Committee for Justice for Morton Sobell and Labor Youth League.

Kinoy was a member of the National Lawyers Guild, serving as national vice president in 1954. In 1964, at the height of the Civil Rights Movement activities in the South to end disenfranchisement and segregation, he participated in a conference sponsored by the National Lawyers Guild's Committee for Legal Assistance in the South. It briefed attorneys on legal problems confronting civil rights demonstrators in Mississippi, where state and local governments resisted change. He and his partner, William Kunstler, were two of the most prominent attorneys during the 1960s to handle civil rights cases in the South.

In 1964, Kinoy became a professor of law at Rutgers University, deciding to enlarge his practice that way. He taught until being forced to retire at the age of 70 in 1991. Following his retirement from Rutgers, Kinoy taught constitutional law at Temple University Law School in Philadelphia from 1994 to 1995 and was a key faculty advisor for the Temple Political & Civil Rights Law Review. From 1964 to 1967 he was also a partner in the law firm of Kunstler, Kunstler & Kinoy of New York City. He was counsel for the Students for a Democratic Society (SDS) and the Southern Conference Educational Fund.

Kinoy was also affiliated with the Emergency Civil Liberties Committee, which in 1966 became part of the newly established Center for Constitutional Rights in New York City, of which he was a founding member. Together with William Kunstler and others, Kinoy determined the need for a non-profit legal defense organization to raise awareness of issues in civil rights and work to overturn unconstitutional practices.

In 1966, Kinoy was a speaker at the annual dinner of the National Guardian newspaper. He also did legal work for the American Civil Liberties Union, which worked to establish precedent in civil and constitutional rights cases.

During the 1950s and 1960s, Kinoy represented persons called to hearings of the House Committee on Un-American Activities; in 1966 he was officially removed from a hearing by Senator Eastland, its chair, and subsequently convicted of disorderly conduct. In 1968, the U.S. Court of Appeals overturned the conviction.

As The New York Times stated in its obituary:

Mr. Kinoy was involved in a number of landmark legal verdicts. In 1965, he successfully argued the case of Dombrowski v. Pfister before the Supreme Court, which empowered federal district court judges to stop enforcement of laws that had ‘a chilling effect’ on free speech. In a subsequent case, Dombrowski v. Senator Eastland, he established that the Counsel of the Senate Internal Security Committee was not immune from suits for violations of citizens’ civil rights. In 1972, the Supreme Court upheld his contention that President Richard M. Nixon had no ‘inherent power’ to wiretap domestic political organizations.

In his autobiography Rights On Trial: The Odyssey Of A People's Lawyer, Kinoy claimed that the break-in at Watergate by Republican Party operatives in 1972 was an attempt to remove, not place, wiretaps in the Democratic Party headquarters. He suggests that it was ordered because the Nixon administration knew of the impending decision in United States v. United States District Court, likely, by a tip from SCOTUS Justice William Rehnquist, who had served as Nixon's Assistant Attorney General of the Office of Legal Counsel prior to joining the Supreme Court.

Kinoy was one of the founders of the Women's Rights Law Reporter, the first legal periodical to focus exclusively on women's rights. Kinoy also was the key founder of the Mass Party Organizing Committee, a coalition-based, electorally friendly attempt to create a socialist third party in the United States in the 1970s.

== Personal life ==
Kinoy was born in a Jewish family, and he was married to Barbara S. Webster at his death. He had previously married and was divorced from Susan Knopf.

Arthur Kinoy died age 82 on September 19, 2003, at his home in New Jersey. He was survived by two children from his first marriage, as well as by his younger brother Ernest Kinoy, a noted television and film screenwriter.

== See also ==
- Morton Sobell
- Frank Donner
- Marshall Perlin
