= Steve Nelson (activist) =

Croatian-born American labor activist (1903–1993)

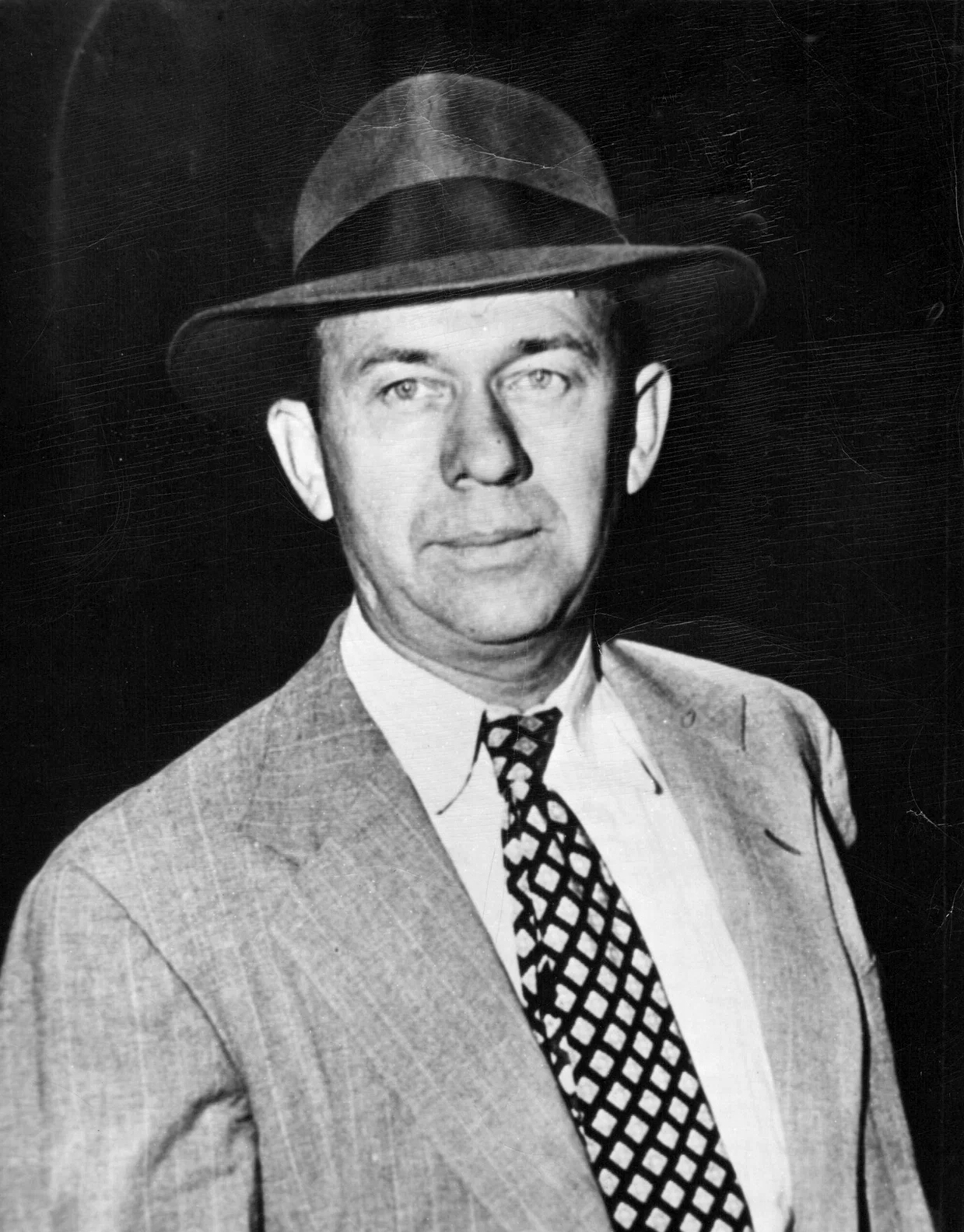
- Nelson in 1948
- Born: Stjepan Mesaroš; January 1, 1903; Subocka, Kingdom of Croatia-Slavonia, Austria-Hungary
- Died: December 11, 1993 (aged 90); New York City, U.S.
- Education: International Lenin School; New York Workers School
- Spouse: Margaret Yaeger (m. 1925; died 1986)
- Children: Josephine; Robert
- Military career
- Allegiance: Spanish Republic
- Branch: International Brigades
- Service years: 1937
- Rank: Battalion Commander
- Unit: The "Abraham Lincoln" XV International Brigade
- Commands: Lincoln Battalion
- Conflicts: Spanish Civil War; Battle of Brunete; Battle of Jarama; Battle of Quinto; Battle of Belchite (WIA)

National Commander of the Veterans of the Abraham Lincoln Brigade
- In office 1963 – December 11, 1993
- Executive Secretary-Treasurer: Mosess Fishman
- Preceded by: Milton Wolff

Personal details
- Party: Socialist Labor (before 1923); Communist (1923–1957)

Steve Nelson (born Stjepan Mesaroš; January 1, 1903 – December 11, 1993) was a Croatian-born American labor activist. He was one of nearly 3,000 American volunteers who joined the Abraham Lincoln Brigade in the Spanish Civil War, where he served as a political commissar. For years, he was a leading functionary of the Communist Party USA. He achieved public notoriety in the early 1950s when he was convicted and imprisoned under the Pennsylvania Sedition Act and the federal Smith Act. He is perhaps best remembered as the defendant in Pennsylvania v. Nelson, a U.S. Supreme Court ruling in 1956 which invalidated state sedition laws.

== Early life ==
Stjepan Mesaroš (sometimes spelled Mesarosh) was born in Subocka, Croatia (then a part of the Austro-Hungarian Empire) on January 1, 1903 to Michael (1870–1920) and Mary Mesaroš (1883–1986). His family were of Hungarian extraction and had been millers on both sides for generations.

His early education was meager as he noted in his oral autobiography:

My formal education consisted of five years in a one-room school with 130 other children at different grade levels and stages of development. Understandably, any learning that took place was almost accidental.

In 1920, Mesaroš emigrated with his mother and three sisters to the United States, specifically to Philadelphia, Pennsylvania where his uncle lived. The first job Mesaroš obtained, with his uncle's help, was in a slaughterhouse. Mesaroš then had a series of jobs in machine shops, auto plants, and metal works. Eventually he found work as a carpenter, which would remain his primary means of income.

In the course of his blue-collar employment in Philadelphia, Mesaroš came in contact with radical co-workers who spurred on his political education. He soon joined the South Slavic branch of the Socialist Labor Party (SLP). In 1923, after he grew dissatisfied with the "stagnancy" of the SLP, he joined the Communist Party's youth group, the Young Workers League (YWL) (later renamed the Young Communist League).

== Career ==
=== Communist Party ===
In the fall of 1923, by now using the Americanized name "Steve Nelson", he relocated to Pittsburgh, which he was told was "a good labor town" with better prospects of finding employment. Through the Pittsburgh branch of the YWL, Nelson met his future wife, Margaret Yaeger. She came from a family with deep roots in radical labor politics. He described her as "much better educated and more sophisticated" than himself. She encouraged him on a path of reading and self-learning, which compensated for his lack of childhood schooling.

In 1925, Nelson left the YWL and joined the Communist Party USA (CPUSA). That same year, he and Margaret moved to Detroit. He worked in the auto industry as an assembly line worker and union organizer. In 1928, the Nelsons relocated to New York City where he studied Marxism at the New York Workers School. With the onset of the Great Depression in late 1929, he and his wife moved to Chicago and began working full-time as Communist Party functionaries.

Nelson was a principal organizer of the International Unemployment Day demonstration that was scheduled to occur on 6 March 1930. Two weeks prior, the Chicago Red Squad unit arrested him, Joe Dallet, and other Party activists. They were taken to a police station and severely beaten. Nelson managed to recover sufficiently by 6 March to join 75,000 demonstrators in Chicago demanding unemployment insurance.

In 1931, he and Margaret were sent to Moscow for two years at the International Lenin School. He became a courier for the Comintern, delivering documents and funds to Germany, Switzerland and China. In 1933, the Nelsons returned to the U.S. and settled in Wilkes-Barre.

=== Spanish Civil War ===
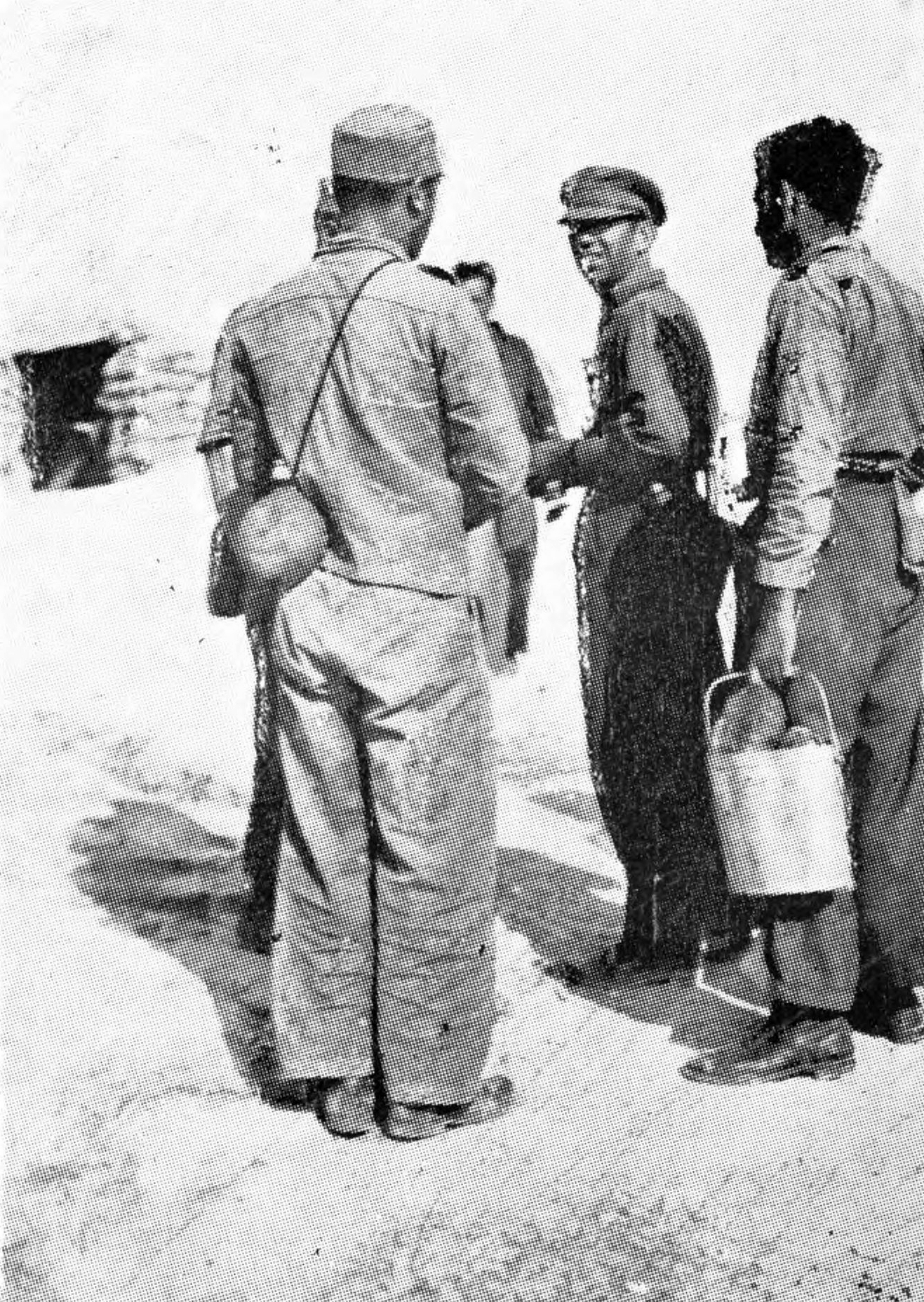
Nelson, facing the camera, at Quinto c. August 1937

With the outbreak of civil war in Spain, Nelson immediately tried to join the Abraham Lincoln Brigade of American volunteers, but he was told by the CPUSA District Committee that he was needed in Pennsylvania to organize anthracite coal miners. However, once the Republican side suffered a severe setback at the Battle of Jarama in February 1937, Nelson, Dallet and 23 others were allowed to fight in Spain. After being briefly arrested and detained in France, they reached Spain by climbing the Pyrenees mountains. They met the International Brigades at Albacete in May 1937. As his first assignment, Nelson was named political commissar of the Abraham Lincoln Battalion. Unusually for his position, he was trusted both by the volunteers and the Party leadership. Following heavy losses at Brunete (during which he briefly served as battalion commander following the death of Oliver Law), the Lincoln Battalion and the George Washington Battalion were merged into the Lincoln–Washington Battalion. Mirko Markovics, a Yugoslav-American, was appointed as commander of the joint unit, with Nelson serving as the commissar.

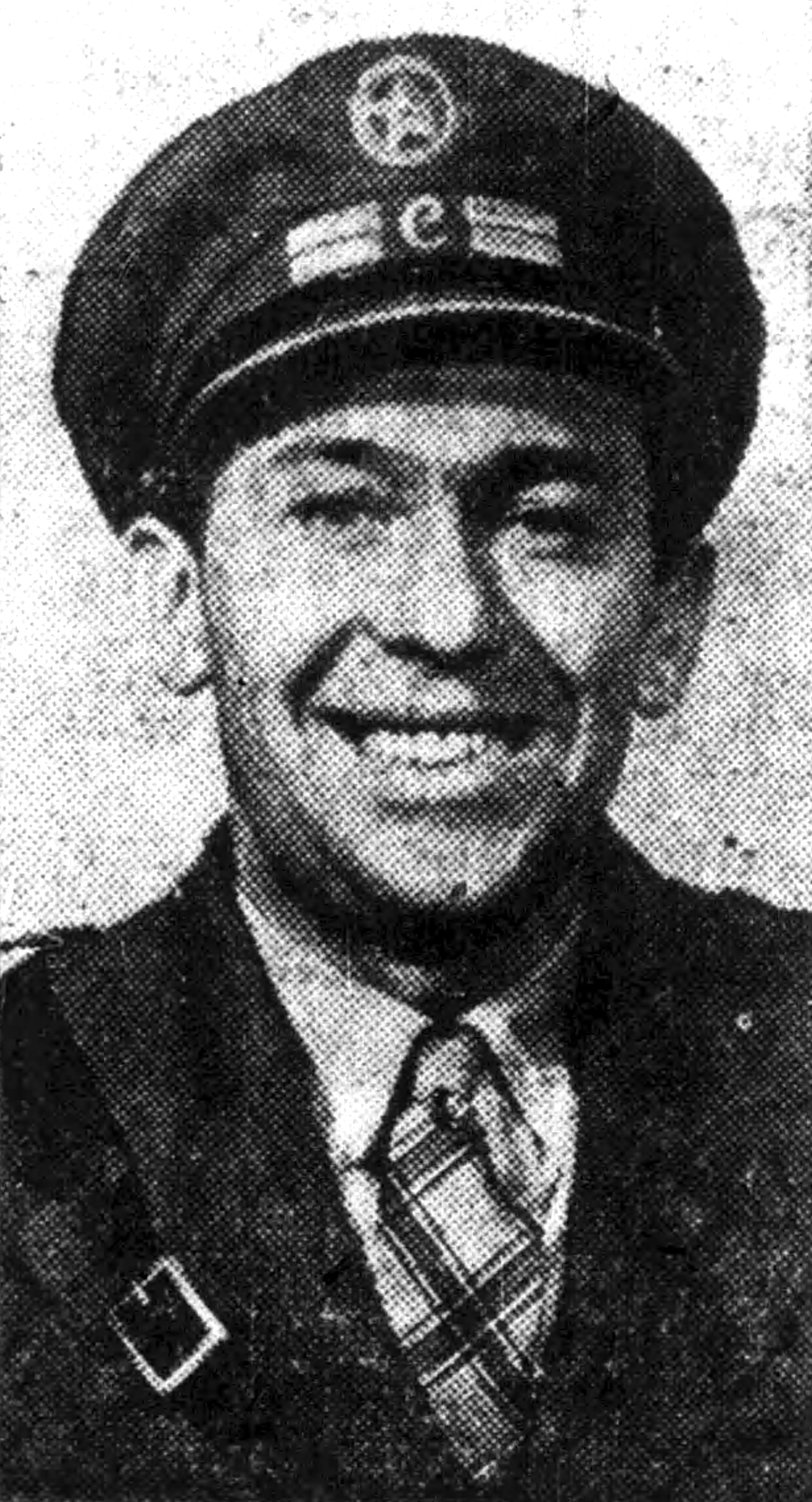
Nelson in uniform shortly after returning home, November 1937

In August 1937, the American forces were reorganized. Nelson was promoted to brigade commissar, and Robert Hale Merriman became brigade chief of staff. Hans Amlie was the new commander of the Lincoln–Washington Battalion. Nelson saw action at Quinto and the Battle of Belchite. The latter conflict started badly for the Republican side—only two soldiers out of 22 survived the first attempt to take a Nationalist stronghold in the town's church. Nelson then led his men in a successful diversionary attack, and Amlie's soldiers were able to enter the fortified town. Nelson was wounded, shot in the face and leg, and Merriman and Amlie received head wounds. After convalescing in Valencia, Nelson was briefly given the task of escorting prominent visitors to the Spanish front, such as John Bernard, Dorothy Parker and Lillian Hellman. In November 1937, he was recalled home by CPUSA leader Earl Browder, who wanted Nelson to go on a speaking tour to educate Americans about the Spanish Civil War.

=== Espionage ===
In the 1940s, Nelson rose through the ranks of the CPUSA. In 1942, he was chairman of the San Francisco branch of the Party. After several years on the West Coast, the Nelson family headed east when he was elected to the National Board of the Party. He eventually settled in Pittsburgh as District Secretary of Western Pennsylvania.

Beginning in 1942, Nelson became involved in espionage activities, particularly as regards the Manhattan Project:

One part of Nelson's task was to gather information on the atomic bomb project. He was seen and overheard meeting with Communist scientists working at the radiation laboratory at Berkeley. Information gleaned from FBI bugging and wiretaps indicated that several had discussed the atomic bomb project with him. Nelson made notes of what the scientists told him regarding their work, and he was subsequently observed passing materials, which the FBI assumed were his notes, to a Soviet intelligence officer operating under diplomatic cover at the USSR's San Francisco consulate."

One of the scientists identified was Joseph Weinberg, who worked at UC Berkeley's Radiation Laboratory. The FBI planted listening devices in Nelson's residence and discovered that Weinberg had supplied "highly secret information regarding experiments being conducted at the Radiation Laboratory, Berkeley, pertaining to the atomic bomb." Investigators reported that Nelson then "delivered this classified information to Soviet consular officer Ivan Ivanov for transmittal to the Soviet Union."

In April 1943, Nelson met with Vasily Zarubin, the most senior NKVD agent in the United States. Nelson was running a secret "control commission" to find informants and spies in the California branch of the Communist Party. During the meeting, Zarubin delivered money. FBI officials were listening in, and they learned the purpose of the transaction was to obtain information for transmittal to the USSR. However, according to historian John Earl Haynes, the FBI subsequently concluded that the many Soviet attempts to obtain vital data about the Manhattan Project were ultimately not successful.

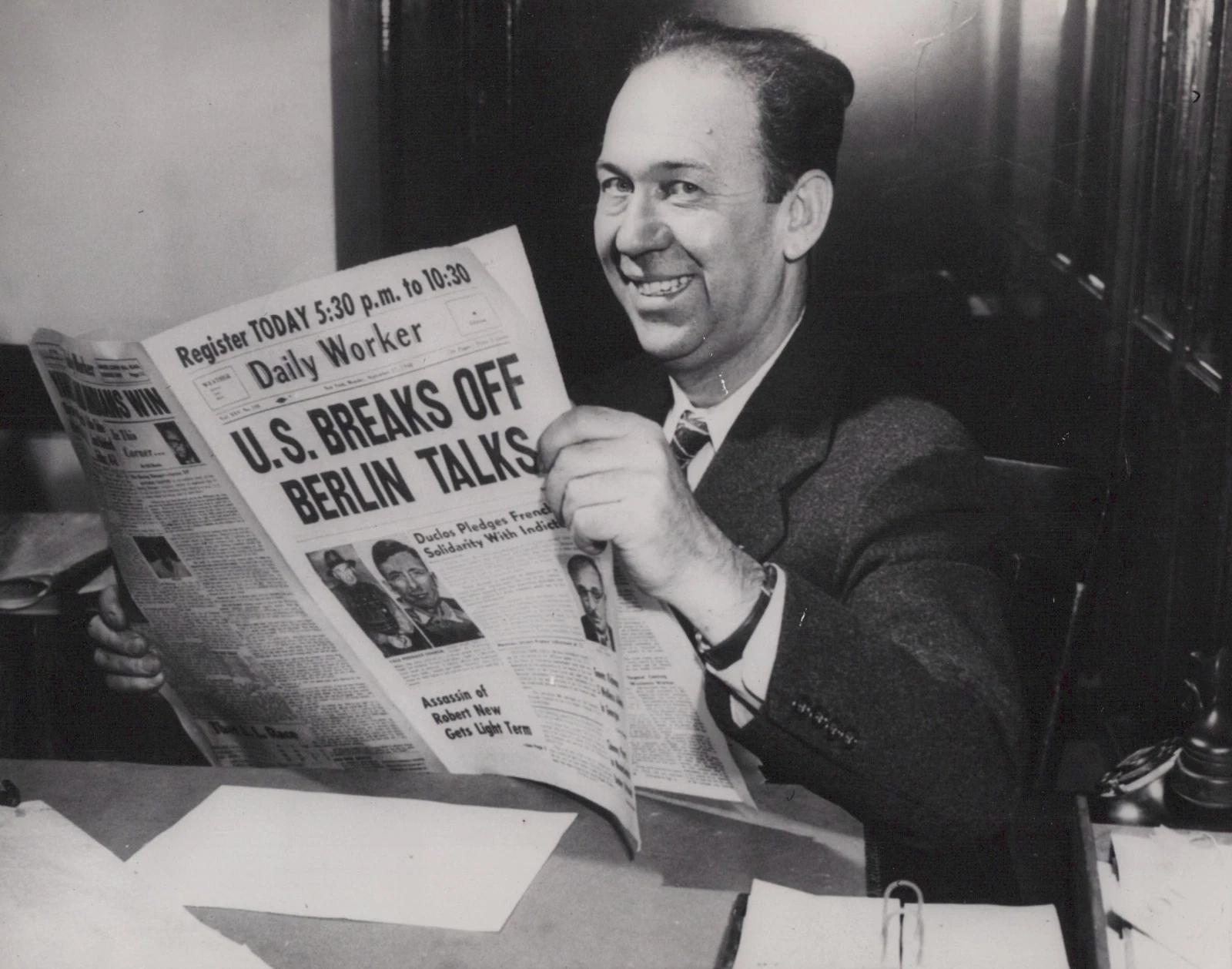
Nelson reads about accusations from the House Un-American Activities Committee of his spying for the Soviet Union in the Daily Worker, September 29, 1948

In 1948, Nelson was subpoenaed by the House Un-American Activities Committee (HUAC). As he later recalled, "Although the subpoena was vaguely worded, there was enough of a hint to show what HUAC was after. There was already a campaign underway to prove that the Soviet Union's development of the atomic bomb was the product of espionage." He appeared before the HUAC in June 1949. His counsel Emanuel Bloch urged him to invoke the Fifth Amendment and decline all questions. Years afterward, Nelson admitted he did not fully grasp the Fifth Amendment because he thought he could selectively answer some questions and invoke the Fifth for others. He quickly learned his mistake. As he put it, the HUAC's chief examiner that day, Congressman Richard Nixon, was "threatening me with contempt before the hearings were five minutes old." Nelson wound up with 33 counts of contempt of Congress, each carrying a possible sentence of one year in jail. Six months later, with Milton Freedman as his lawyer, Nelson managed to get the contempt charges dismissed.

=== Sedition charges ===
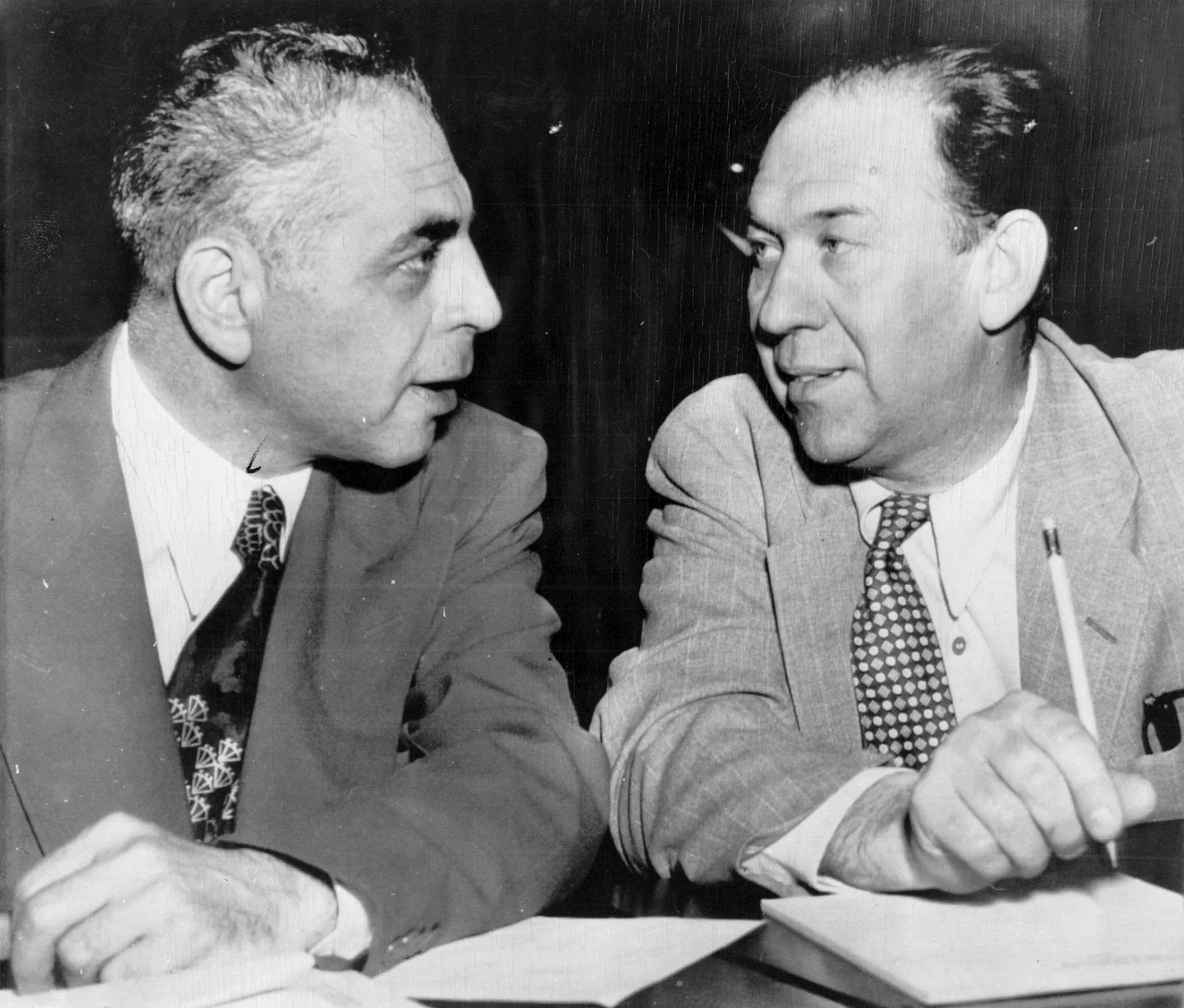
Nelson (right) with his attorney Emanuel H. Bloch, June 8, 1951

In August 1950, following a raid on the Pittsburgh Party Headquarters, Nelson and two local Party leaders were arrested and charged under the 1919 Pennsylvania Sedition Act. It was a WWI-era law that made it illegal to incite disloyalty against the government. After 80 lawyers turned down his request for legal counsel, Nelson resolved to handle his own case. In what became a widely publicized trial, he was convicted, fined $10,000 plus court costs, and sentenced to 20 years in prison.

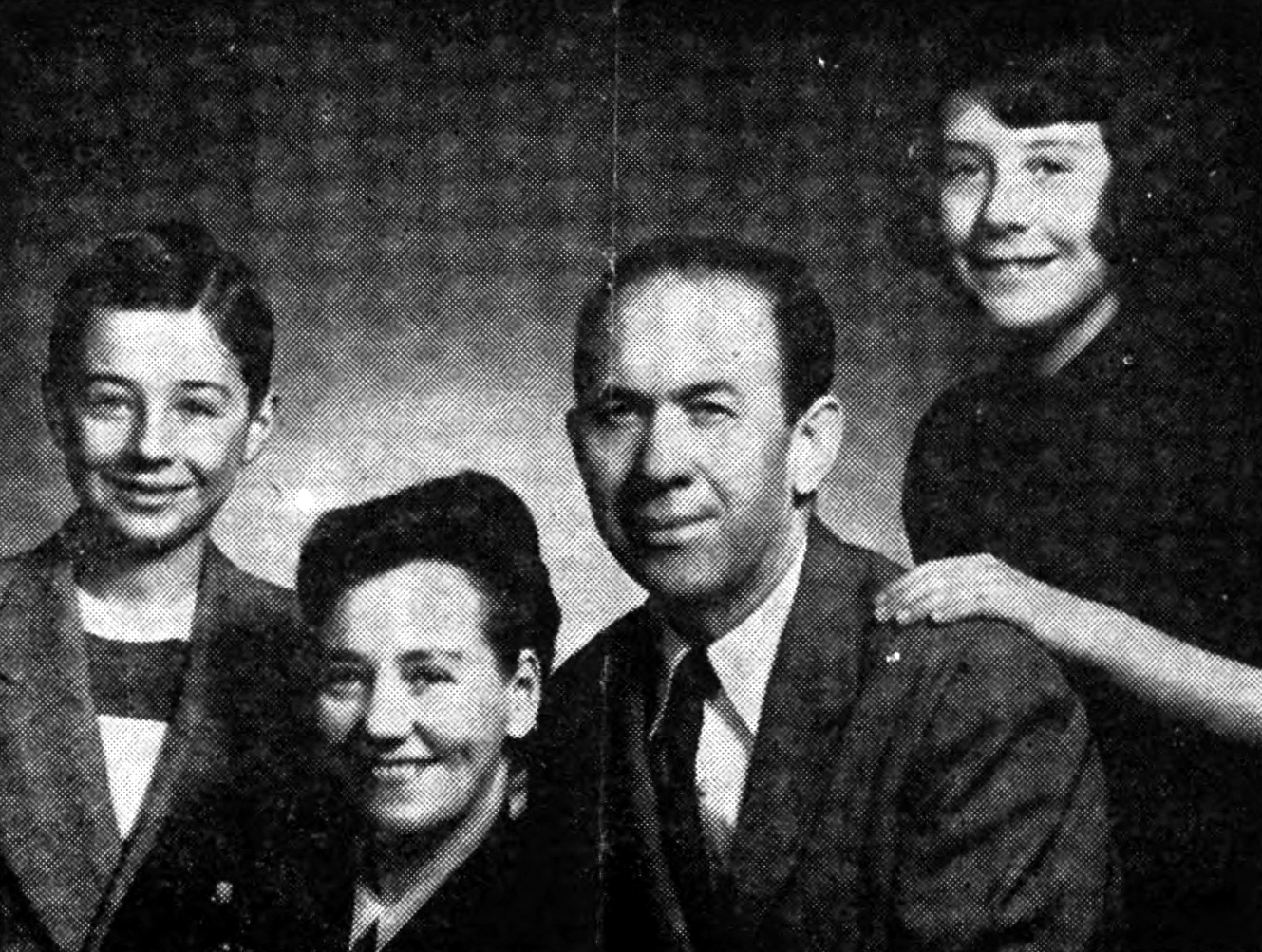
Nelson with his wife Margaret and children Bobby and Josephine c. 1952

After serving seven months in Allegheny County Prison, his term was interrupted by a competing case. In 1953, he and five others were indicted under the federal Smith Act of 1940, which made it a crime to advocate the overthrow of the government by violence. All six defendants were found guilty and each was sentenced to five years imprisonment and $10,000 in fines. They were granted bail pending their appeals. The appeals process dragged on for several years. During this period, Nelson wrote books about his experiences in Spain (The Volunteers) and his sedition trial and imprisonment (The 13th Juror) to raise money to sustain him and his family.

Finally, in April 1956 in Pennsylvania v. Nelson, the U.S. Supreme Court overturned the Pennsylvania Sedition Act conviction, saying that the Smith Act, as a federal statute, superseded the enforceability of state sedition laws. Then, in October 1956, the U.S. Supreme Court ruled that the testimony at Nelson's sedition trial had been perjured by an FBI informant, and a new trial was granted. In 1957, the government dropped all charges against the defendants.

=== Later years ===
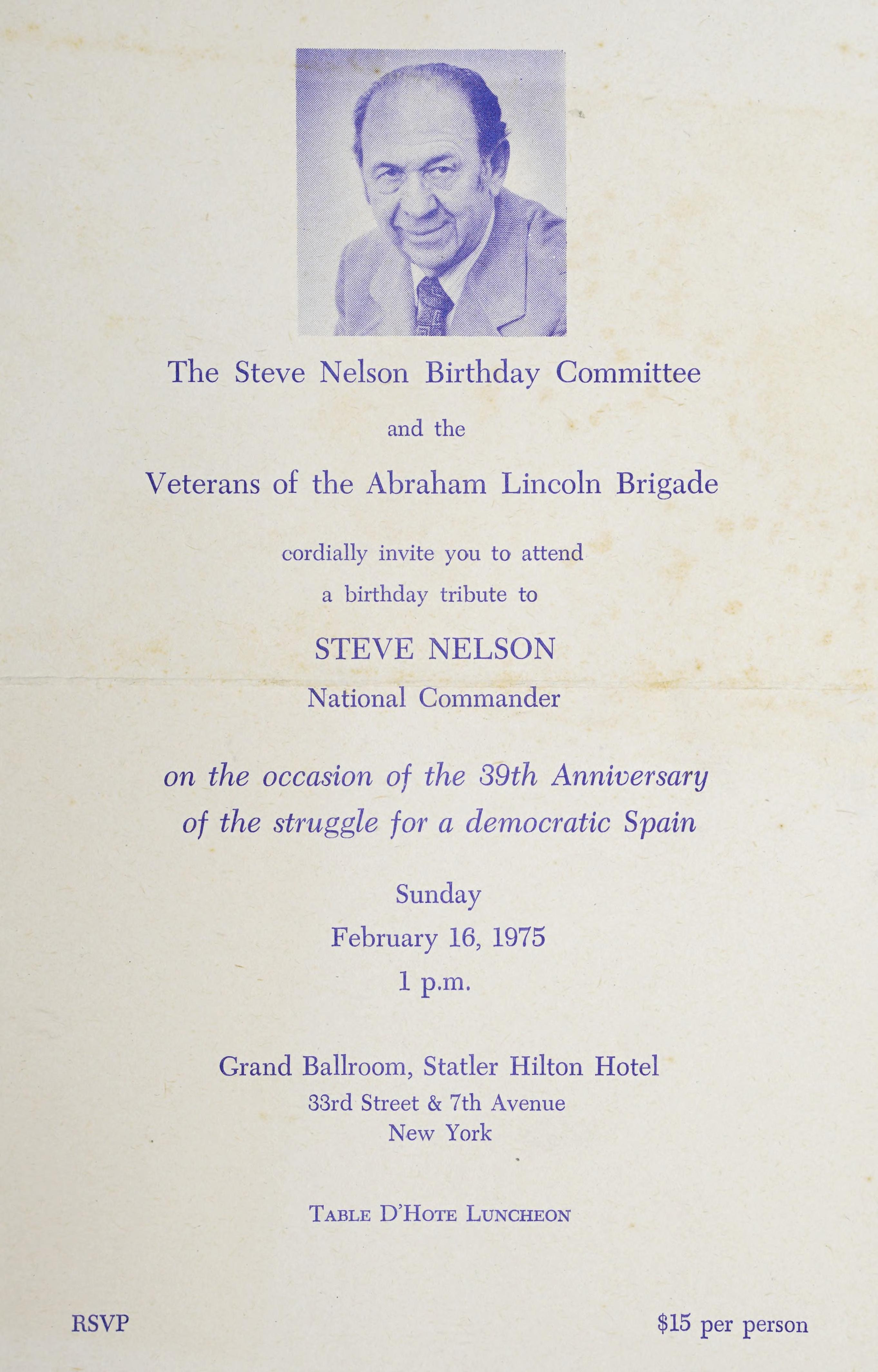
Invitation to a birthday tribute for Nelson hosted by the Veterans of the Abraham Lincoln Brigade, 1975

In the aftermath of Nikita Khrushchev's secret speech about atrocities committed under Joseph Stalin's rule, Nelson resigned from the CPUSA in 1957. Over the next couple of decades, he went back to carpentry as his means of earning a living. In 1963, he became National Commander of the Veterans of the Abraham Lincoln Brigade (VALB). In 1975, he and Margaret retired to a home he had built in Truro, Massachusetts on Cape Cod. With help from co-authors James R. Barrett and Rob Ruck, Nelson published his oral autobiography in 1981, Steve Nelson: American Radical.

== Death ==
Margaret Nelson died in 1986. Steve Nelson died at Manhattan's Presbyterian Hospital on 11 December 1993, at age 90. His family said the cause was complications after aorta surgery.

== Works ==
- The Volunteers: A Personal Narrative of the Fight Against Fascism in Spain. New York: Masses and Mainstream. 1953. LCCN 53008179.
- The 13th Juror: The Inside Story of My Trial. New York: Masses and Mainstream. 1955. LCCN 55031685.
- Steve Nelson: American Radical. Pittsburgh: University of Pittsburgh Press. 1981. LCCN 80026528.

== See also ==
- Americans Battling Communism
- Foley Square trial
- William Albertson
- Albertson v. Subversive Activities Control Board
