= Frank Donner (lawyer) =

American lawyer (1911–1993)

Frank Donner (November 25, 1911 – June 10, 1993) was a civil liberties lawyer, author, and the director of the American Civil Liberties Union's (ACLU) Project on Political Surveillance, whose clients included Morton Sobell (fellow accused in the Julius and Ethel Rosenberg case) and William Albertson.

== Early life and education ==
Born in Brooklyn, New York, in 1911 to working-class parents, Donner earned both his bachelor's and master's degrees (1934) from the University of Wisconsin and a law degree from Columbia University in 1937.

== Career ==
Donner worked as a staff attorney for the National Labor Relations Board (NLRB) from 1940 to 1943. In 1947, he went into private practice, primarily representing the United Electrical, Radio and Machine Workers of America and the United Steelworkers of America.

With attorneys Arthur Kinoy and Marshall Perlin he founded the New York firm Donner, Kinoy & Perlin, which specialized in representing progressive and leftist clients, including Soviet spy Morton Sobell and the Labor Youth League. In the 1950s, the firm represented numerous individuals, including labor officials, who refused to take loyalty oaths or to testify on their membership in communist organizations, as well as several who were prosecuted under the Smith Act.

Donner, himself, was brought before the House Committee on Un-American Activities in 1956, accused of membership in a Communist cell within the NLRB in the 1940s. He refused to testify, invoking his fifth amendment rights. Donner was a board member for the National Lawyers Guild.

In 1977, Donner filed for administrative damages for William Albertson's widow, which led to a lawsuit in 1984 that went to appeal and then the Supreme Court before the federal government settled out of court for $170,000.

Beginning in 1970, Donner headed the Project on Political Surveillance for the ACLU. During that time he wrote several books outlining official use of domestic surveillance and the use of Red Squads, programs like COINTELPRO, and other agencies to infiltrate organizations suspected of political dissent. Donner was particularly interested in the “modern” version of these policing organization that were focused on groups such as Veterans Against the Vietnam War. Many of these policing organizations infiltrated and were the majority members of some of these groups.

Donner also cited the government's use of scapegoats to divert attention from government criticism onto other political groups.

== Works ==
- (1961) The Un-Americans
- (1971) "Theory and Practice of American Political Intelligence", in The New York Review of Books
- (1980) The Age of Surveillance: The Aims & Methods of America's Political Intelligence System
- (1991) Protectors of Privilege: Red Squads and Political Repression in Urban America

== See also ==
- Morton Sobell
- William Albertson
- National Lawyers Guild
- Arthur Kinoy
- Marshall Perlin
