= Helen Levitov Sobell =

American poet

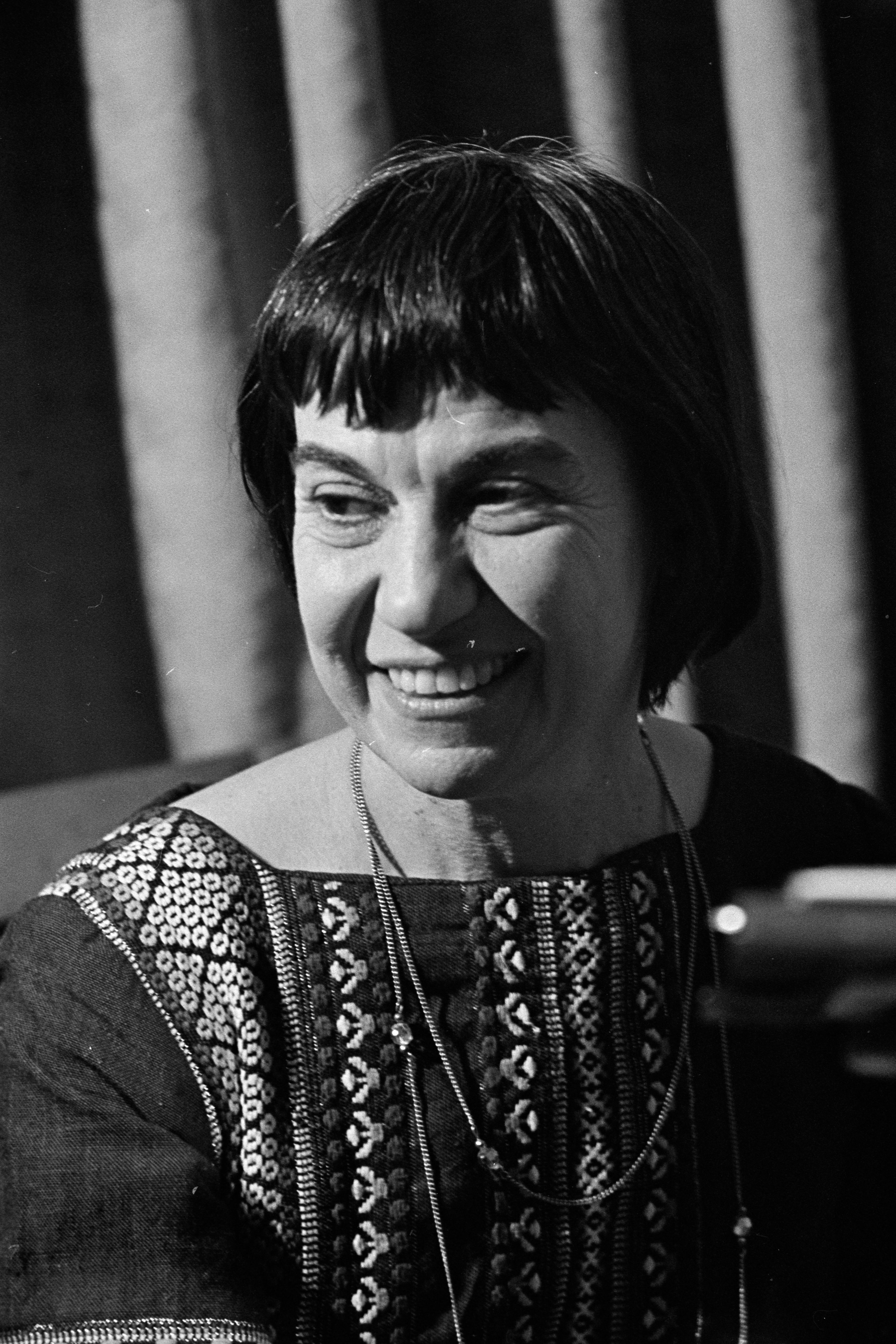
- Sobell in 1969
- Born: March 13, 1918; Washington, D.C.
- Died: April 15, 2002 (aged 84); Redwood City, California
- Education: Columbia University
- Occupations: Teacher, scientist
- Known for: Wife of Morton Sobell
- Spouses: Clarence Gurewitz (m. 1938; div. 1943) Morton Sobell (m. 1945; div. 1980)
- Children: Sydney Gurewitz Clemens (b. 1939), Mark G. Sobell (b. 1949)

Helen Levitov Sobell (March 13, 1918 – April 15, 2002) was an American teacher, scientist and activist, and the former wife of convicted spy Morton Sobell. She petitioned but failed to save Julius and Ethel Rosenberg from execution for conspiracy to commit espionage.

== Biography ==
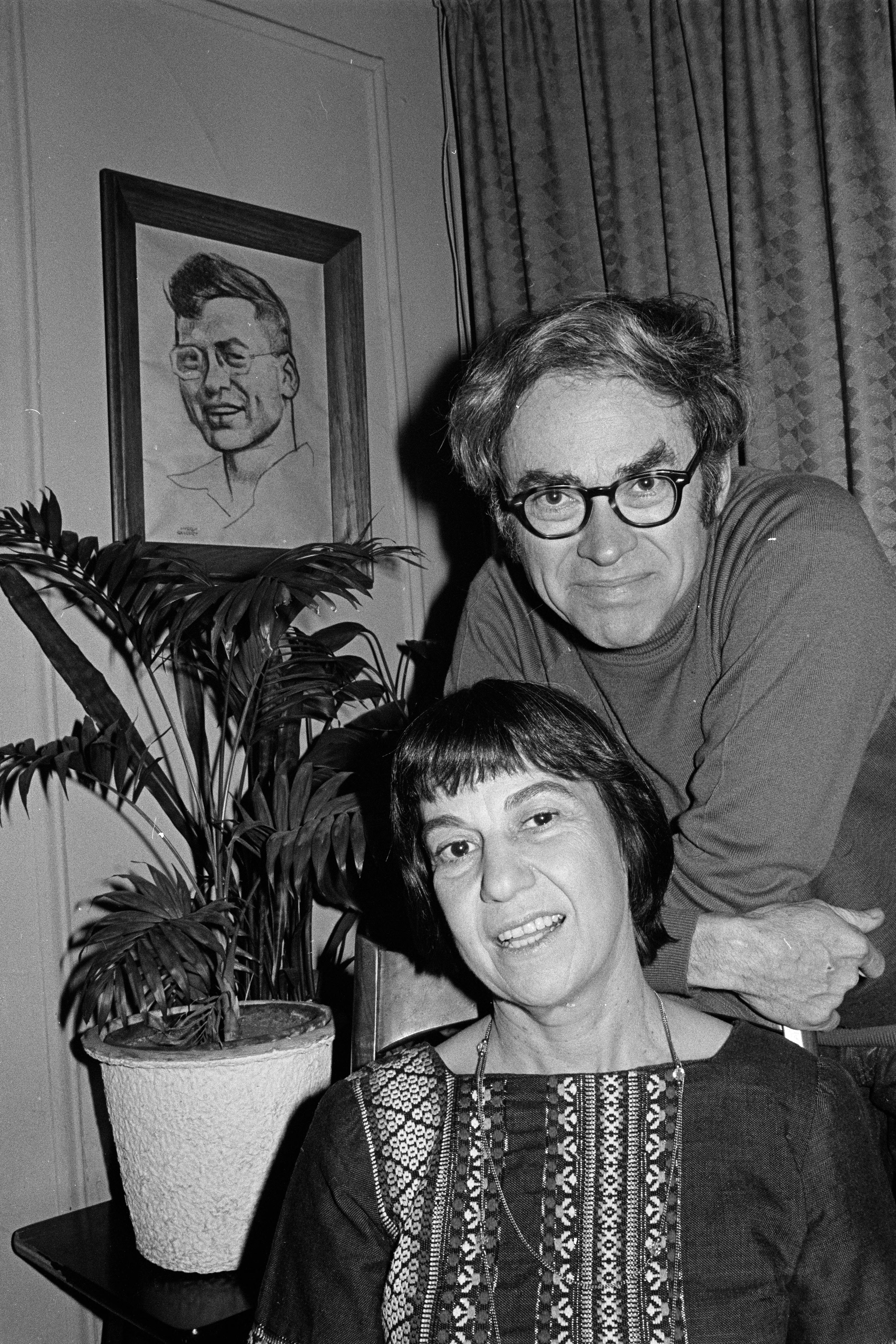
Sobell (bottom) with her husband Morton shortly after his release from prison, March 2, 1969. In the back is a portrait of Morton by Hugo Gellert.

Helen Levitov was born in Washington, D.C. Her parents, Max and Rose, were Yiddish-speaking Jews from the Russian Empire who immigrated to the United States in 1909 and 1908, respectively. As a child, she contracted polio.

During her lifetime, she attended Wilson Teachers College. Throughout World War II she worked at the National Bureau of Standards as a spectrometer technician. In 1938, Levitov married Clarence Darrow Gurewitz. They divorced seven years later, in 1945.

Levitov went to work at the General Electric Company in Schenectady, New York, where she met, then married, Morton Sobell. Levitov Sobell then studied physics at the Rensselaer Polytechnic Institute. She moved to New York City in 1947 and was, three years later, awarded an M.S. in physics from Columbia University.

After being accused of spying, she and her husband fled to Mexico. They were abducted on August 16, 1950, by Mexican agents and turned over to the Federal Bureau of Investigation. She was not prosecuted, but her husband was convicted of "conspiracy to commit espionage" and sentenced to 30 years in federal prison.

She campaigned to save the Rosenbergs from execution, raising more than $1 million for their defense. She also fought to have her husband's conviction overturned, filing eight unsuccessful appeals and even leasing the main stage at Carnegie Hall where she hosted the "Committee to Secure Justice for Morton Sobell" on May 15, 1956.

In 1956, she published a book of poems, You, Who Love Life.

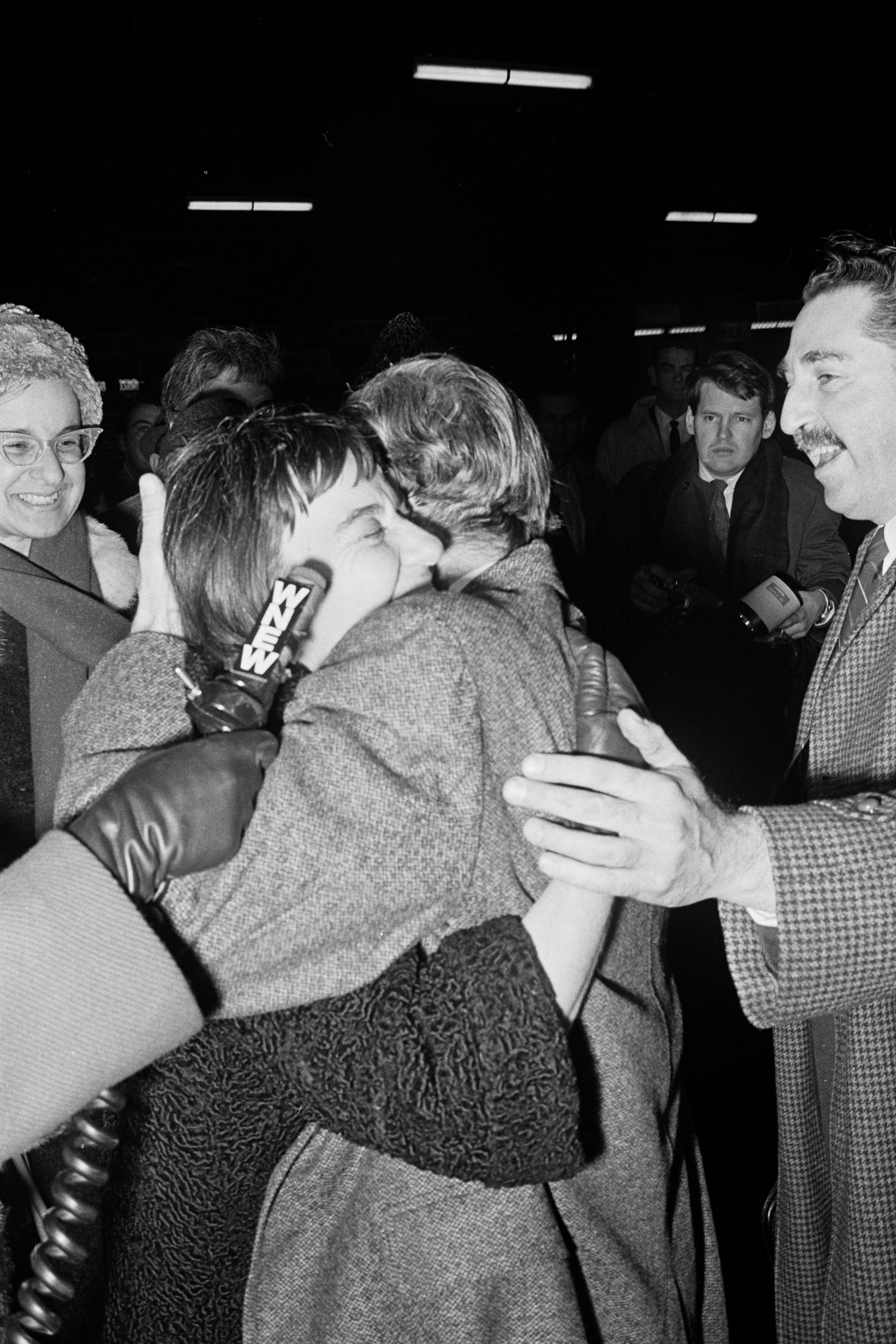
Sobell embraces her husband Morton after his release from prison, January 14, 1969

She then taught science at the Elisabeth Irwin High School. Her husband was released from prison in 1969. In 1980, at the age of 62, she earned her Ph.D. in computer education from Teachers College, Columbia University.

The Sobells separated in 1980. They formally divorced the following year, after which she moved to San Francisco. There, she taught briefly at Contra Costa College before retiring. She also became an active member of the Gray Panthers.

After living with Alzheimer's disease for a decade, she died on April 15, 2002, at a nursing home in Redwood City, California.
