= William Albertson =

American politician (1910–1972)

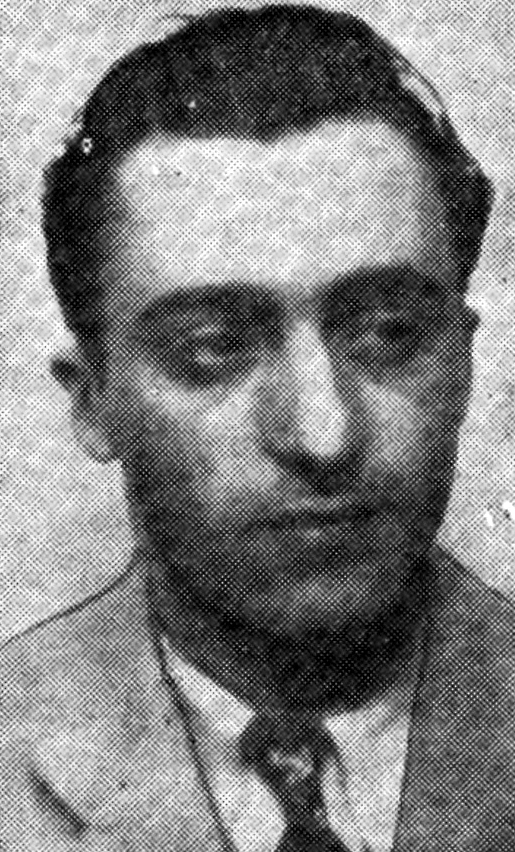
- Albertson c. 1952
- Born: May 7, 1910; Odessa, Kherson Governorate, Russian Empire
- Died: February 19, 1972 (aged 61)
- Education: University of Pittsburgh
- Occupations: Party executive and leader
- Years active: 1927–1964
- Employer: Communist Party USA
- Known for: Lawsuit against US Government for damages under Federal Tort Claims Act
- Notable work: Supreme Court law suits in his name
- Movement: Communism
- Criminal charge: Smith Act
- Criminal penalty: 60 days
- Spouse: Lillie Albertson
- Children: Peter Albertson

William Albertson (May 7, 1910 – February 19, 1972) was a 20th-century American leader in the Communist Party of the USA who battled federal and state courts, and who in 1964 was framed by the Federal Bureau of Investigation, which was only discovered posthumously in 1975. His widow made an out-of-court settlement in 1989 with the U.S. Government for $170,000.

== Background ==
William Albertson was born on May 7, 1910, in Odessa (then in the Russian Empire, now in Ukraine). On February 10, 1911, arrived in Philadelphia with his mother, Esther Dashevsky, from whom he received derivative citizenship (June 29, 1927). Starting in 1923, he attended Schenley High School in Pittsburgh. In September 1927, he began pre-med studies at the University of Pittsburgh. In 1928, he joined the Young Communist League of America. In 1929, he was expelled for activities with the university's "Liberal Club" for organizing a meeting in support of labor leader Tom Mooney.

== Career ==
=== Communist Party ===
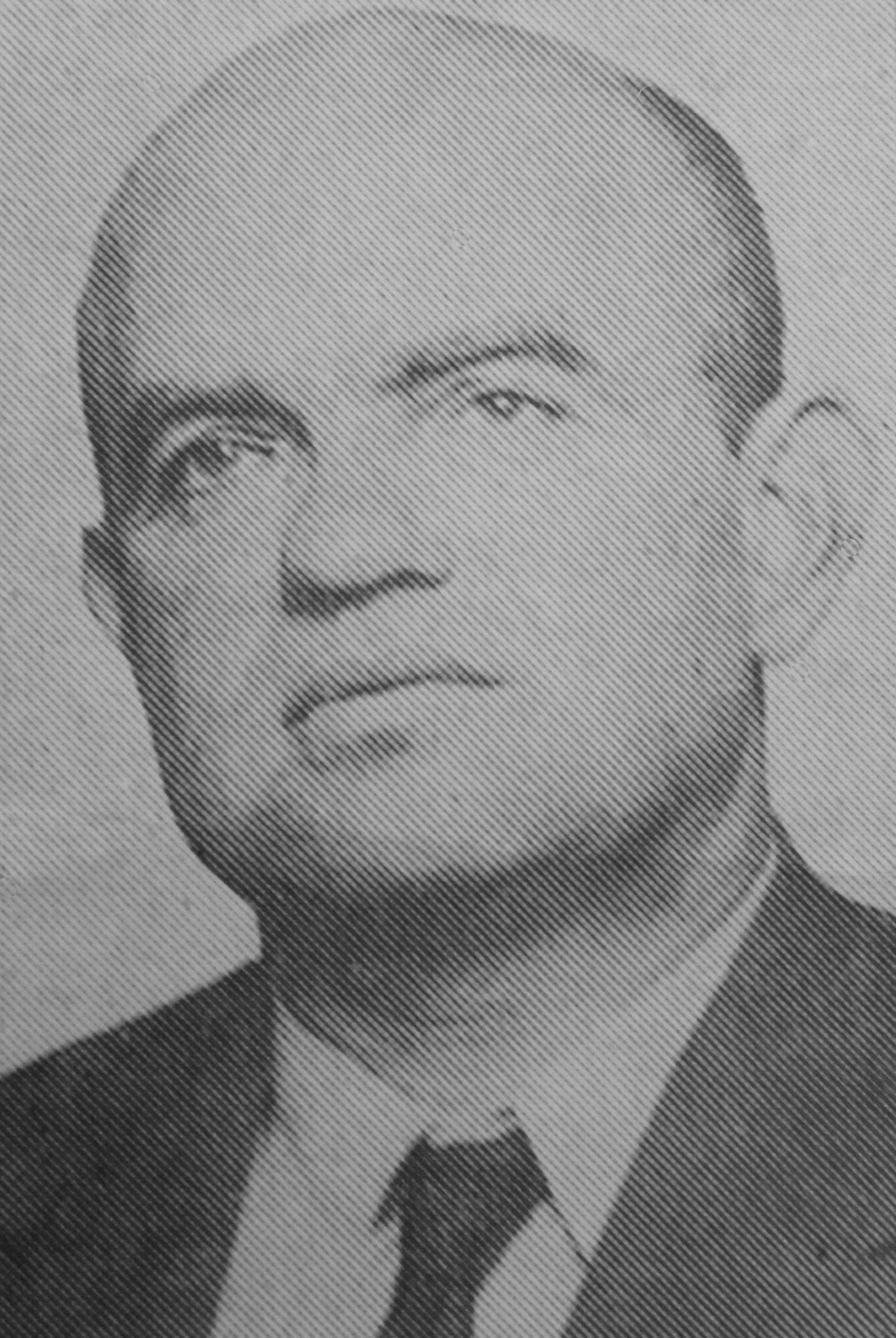
Joseph Zack Kornfeder named Albertson as Party member in 1939

In 1927, Albertson joined the Communist Party of the USA.

On January 15, 1931, Albertson was to serve as secretary of a "Provisional Anti-War Youth Committee" of New York State to hold a rally for a Liebknecht Memorial and Anti-War Demonstration at the Star Casino at Park Avenue and 107th Street in Manhattan; CPUSA executive William Weinstone and YCL leader Gil Green were to attend.

By 1932, Albertson had moved to New York City, where he lived until 1947. He worked there as a labor union official and organizer through 1940.

In 1932, Albertson stood as Party candidate for the senate of the New York State Assembly.

In 1934, Albertson stood as Party candidate for House Representative from New York's 17th congressional district.

On October 1, 1939, Joseph Zack, former Party official and witness for the Dies Committee of the U.S. House named Albertson in a list of Party directors and seven out of 40 CIO directors of the Congress of Industrial Organizations (CIO) union. On October 17, 1939, former Party co-founder Benjamin Gitlow named Albertson as a Party leader.

In 1942, he served a year as secretary and treasurer of the Hotel Employees and Restaurant Employees Union Local 16, American Federation of Labor. (In 1934, his name had appeared in The Red Network: A Who's Who and Handbook of Radicalism for Patriots by Elizabeth Dilling: "ALBERTSON, WILLIAM: Communist Party functionary; organizer Food Wkrs. Indust. Un.") During the same period, he supported the candidacy of Israel Amter for governor of New York on the Communist Party ticket.

In 1943, he served a year as labor secretary of the national CPUSA and also as member of the Party's New York State Committee.

In 1944, he served a year as vice president of the Brooklyn Communist Political Association.

In 1945, Albertson's name appeared among many others assembled by Father John Francis Cronin in a privately circulated report called The Problem of American Communism in 1945: Facts and Recommendations.

In 1946, Albertson served as Assistant National Labor Secretary of the CPUSA.

In 1947, Albertson returned to Pittsburgh as Organizational Secretary of the CPUSA's District 5 (Western Pennsylvania). That same year, his name appeared in an appendix of principal officers of the national Communist Party under "National review board" as secretary.

In 1950, the Party transferred him as Trade Union Secretary of the CPUSA's District 7 (Detroit).

In the 1950s and 1960s, Albertson was a prominent national Party official, based in New York City, where he became state Party secretary in 1958.

In 1950, FBI informant Matt Cvetic named "William Albertson, district secretary of the Communist Party in western Pennsylvania." Cvetic managed to work his testimony into an attack on former U.S. Vice President and presidential candidate Henry A. Wallace. As the New York Times reported, "A former undercover agent for the Federal Bureau of Investigation testified today that Henry A. Wallace once conferred with two well known Pittsburgh Communists about support for his third-party Presidential campaign. Matthew Cvetic was the agent. He told the House Un-American Activities Committee that he himself was one of the pair of well-known Communist party members." Cvetic also named both Steve Nelson, who would face arrest with Albertson and four other third-tier Party leaders the following year.

On January 22, 1962, the State Department revoked the passports of Albertson and several other leaders of the Communist Party.

In a June 1, 1963, report on subversive activities, U.S. Attorney General Robert F. Kennedy referred to Albertson several times, in part because Kennedy had filed petitions to force Albertson and others to register as Party members.

=== Arrest and first Supreme Court Albertson v. Millard ===
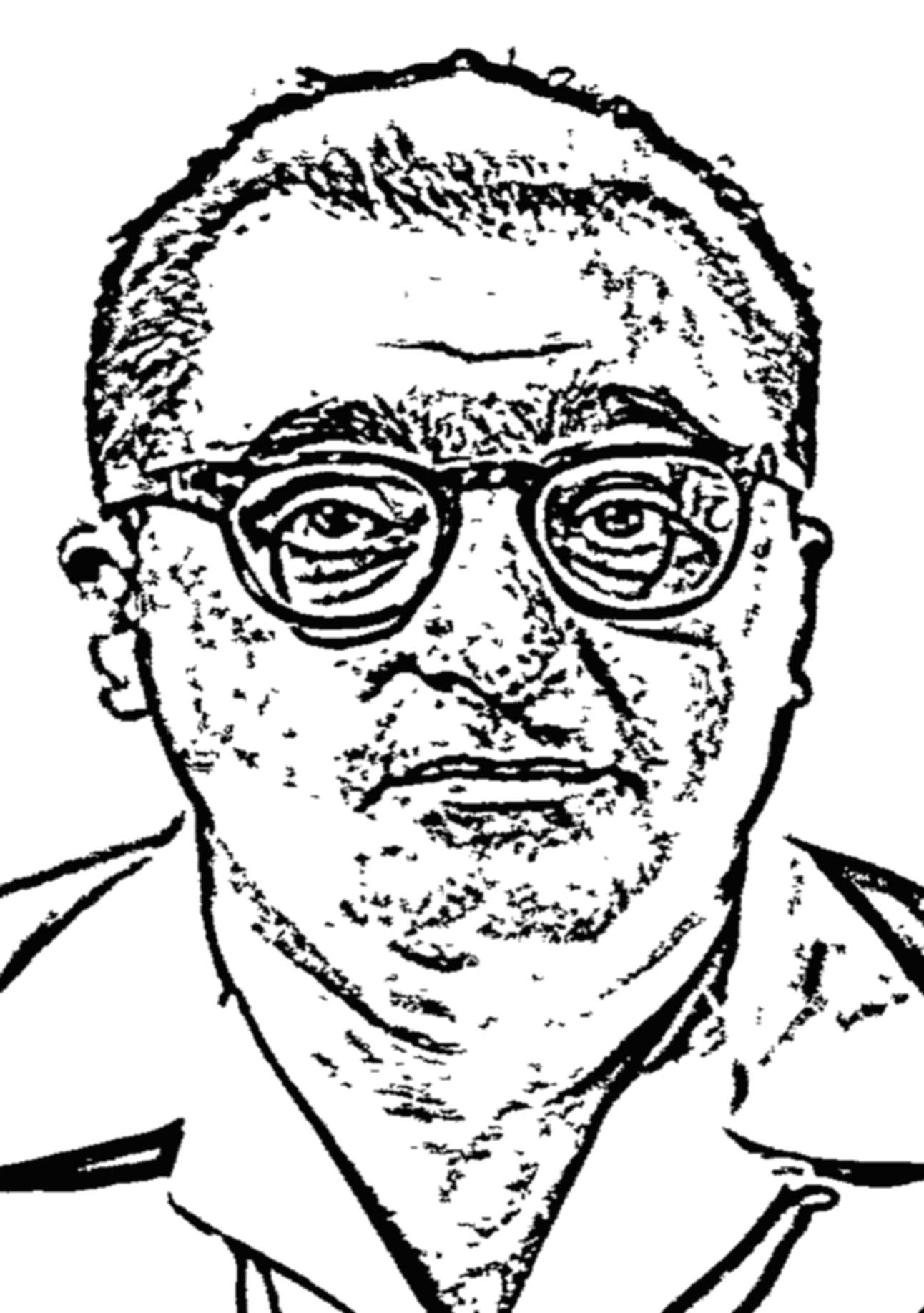
Albertson's FBI mugshot c. 1951

On July 23, 1950, a Pittsburgh Common Pleas Court asked State Attorney General J. Howard McGrath to "intern" Albertson and Nelson among eleven western Pennsylvanian Party officials as "dangerous to the best interests of our country."

On August 17, 1951, the FBI held a fourth roundup of Party leaders since the Foley Square Trial which included Albertson and five others. who soon found themselves indicted by a federal grand jury. The New York Times detailed his arrest: Albertson was arrested near Flat Rock, Michigan, while driving with his wife and two children" by the FBI. The FBI also arrested Nelson, "accused by the House Committee on Un-American Activities of setting up a Red cell at the University of California. Radiation Laboratory, during World War II and obtaining atomic secrets for Russia." In November 1952, his trial started in Pittsburgh. In August 1953, he was convicted under the Smith Act for conspiring to advocate violent overthrow of the U.S. government. He received a five-year prison. He served 60 days in jail for contempt of court.

Albertson's case reached the United States Supreme Court, whose opinion stated:

United States Supreme Court
345 U.S. 242

ALBERTSON v. MILLARD

Argued: Feb. 2, 1953. --- Decided: March 16, 1953

On April 17, 1952, the Governor of Michigan signed the Michigan Communist Control Bill. On April 22, 1952, the Communist Party of Michigan and William Albertson, its Executive Secretary, filed a complaint in the United States District Court or the Eastern District of Michigan. Sections 2-5, inclusive, and Section 7 of the Act were alleged to violate various provisions of the Federal Constitution. A declaratory judgment to that effect was sought, along with an injunction to prevent state officials and officers from enforcing the Act. A three-judge District Court, 106 F.Supp. 635, found the Act constitutional and an appeal was taken to this Court.

Section 5 of the Act requires the registration of Communists, the Communist Party and Communist front organizations, and Section 7 prevents them from appearing on any ballot in the State. 'Communist,' 'Communist Party,' and 'Communist front organization' are given a statutory meaning by the Michigan Legislature. [1] Mich. Acts 1952, No. 117.

These definitions are challenged by the appellants as void for vagueness. The definition of a Communist as '* * * a member of the communist party, notwithstanding the fact that he may not pay dues to, or hold a card in, said party * * *' is said to be vague since once dues and cards are eliminated as criteria there are no readily apparent means of determining who is a member. As to the definition of the Communist Party as an organization '* * * substantially directed, dominated or controlled by the Union of Soviet Socialist Republics or its satellities' it is contended there are no standards as to what is a 'satellite.' In regard to the definition of both Communist Party and Communist front organization as an organization which '* * * in any manner advocates, or acts to further, the world communist movement' appellants point to the failure to define the 'world communist movement' as creating vagueness. The answers given to these and possibly other problems of construction and interpretation arising under the definitions in Sections 2-4 will determine the ultimate scope of the Act.
Interpretation of state legislation is primarily the function of state authorities, judicial and administrative. The construction given to a state statute by the state courts is binding upon federal courts. There has been no interpretation of this statute by the state courts. The absence of such construction stems from the fact this action in federal court was commenced only five days after the statute became law.

There is pending in the Circuit Court for Wayne County, Michigan, a bill seeking a declaratory judgment that the Act is unconstitutional, both on federal and state grounds. That action is being held in abeyance pending our mandate and decision in this case.

We deem it appropriate in this case that the state courts construe this statute before the District Court further considers the action. See Rescue Army v. Municipal Court of City of Los Angeles, 1947, 331 U.S. 549, 67 S.Ct. 1409, 91 L.Ed. 1666; American Federation of Labor v. Watson, 1946, 327 U.S. 582, 66 S.Ct. 761, 90 L.Ed. 873; and Spector Motor Service v. McLaughlin, 1944, 323 U.S. 101, 65 S.Ct. 152, 89 L.Ed. 101.

The judgment is vacated and the cause remanded to the District Court for the Eastern District of Michigan with directions to vacate the restraining order it issued and to hold the proceedings in abeyance a reasonable time pending construction of the statute by the state courts either in pending litigation or other litigation which may be instituted.

On September 13, 1957, D. Malcom Anderson, U.S. Attorney for the Western District of Pennsylvania, asked U.S. District Judge to dismiss the indictment against five of the six Party leaders, including Steve Nelson and William Albertson, following discovery that one of the principal witnesses in the 1953 trial "may have lied."

=== New York State Matter of Albertson (Lubin) ===
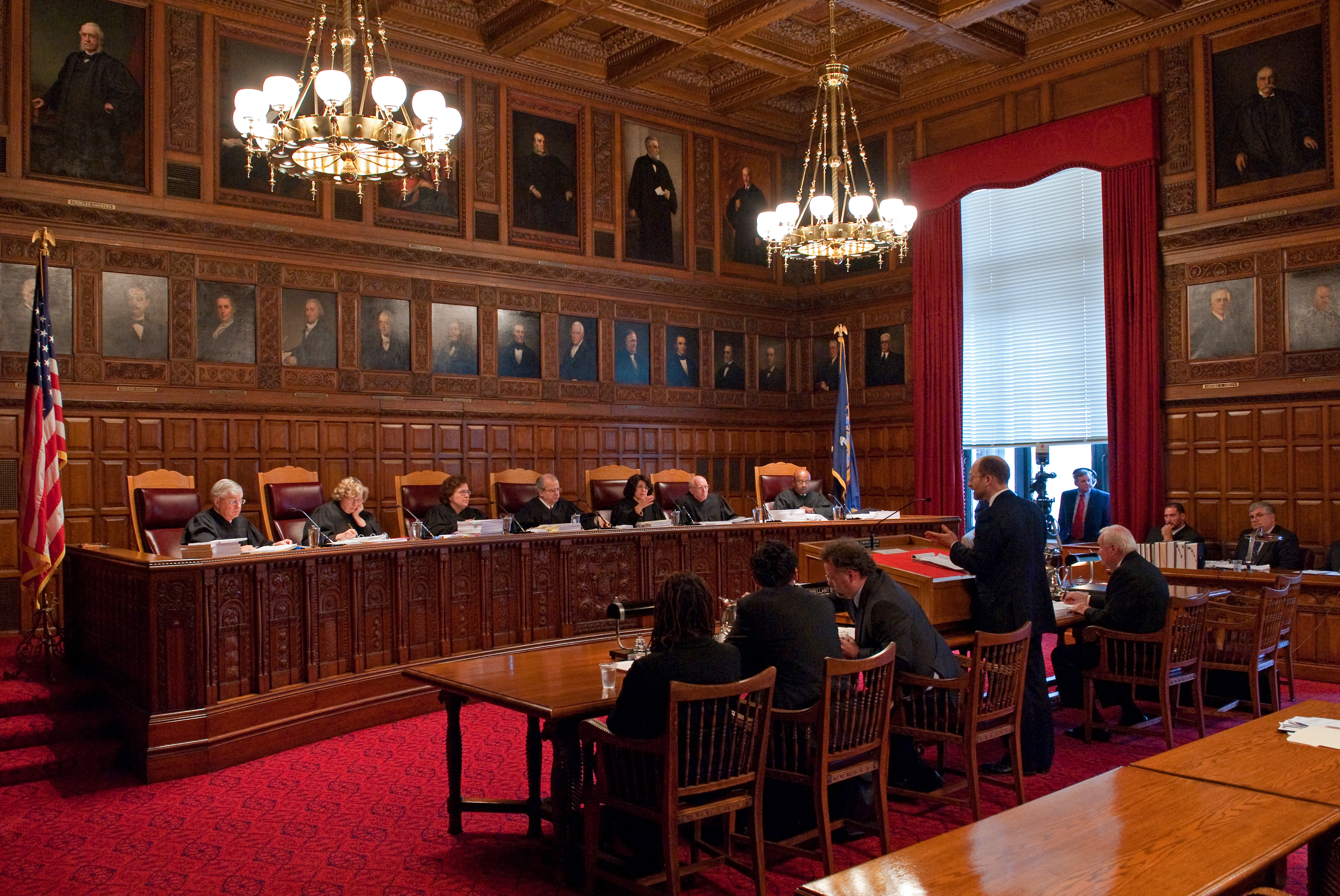
The Court of Appeals of the State of New York (interior 2009) heard a case involving Albertson

In 1960, Albertson sued for unemployment insurance for work for the Communist Party. Albertson won in court, but the case went to the Court of Appeals of the State of New York on March 28. Representing him were Stephen C. Vladeck and Judith P. Vladeck (parents of David Vladeck and Anna Vladeck of Vladeck, Raskin & Clark) and Sylvan H. Elias. Representing the Communist Party was John J. Abt. Isador Lubin as Industrial Commissioner represented the Appellant. The court summarized the appeal as follows:

Two separate but related questions arise in this consolidated proceeding. We are first to decide whether, on the theory that his employment by the Communist Parties (N. Y. and U. S. A.) was not "covered employment", respondent Albertson is ineligible for unemployment insurance benefits. Second, we must determine whether the Industrial Commissioner was legally justified in suspending the registration of the Communist Parties themselves as "employers" within the meaning of the Unemployment Insurance Law.

On May 26, 1960, came the verdict. On the one hand:

We agree with the Appellate Division that Albertson is not to be denied an unemployment insurance award solely because part of his base period of employment was with the Communist organizations. Nothing was proven beyond that bare fact.

However:

In so doing, he [the Industrial Commissioner] could not ignore the Federal Communist Control Act (U. S. Code, tit. 50, § 842) which declared that the Communist Party is "not entitled to any of the rights, privileges, and immunities attendant upon legal bodies created under the jurisdiction of the laws of the United States or any political subdivision thereof; and whatever rights, privileges and immunities which have heretofore been granted to said party or any subsidiary organization by reason of the laws of the United States or any political subdivision thereof are terminated". We take that plain declaration and its absolute language to mean what it says.

Therefore, the Appeals Court denied Albertson's claim. The dissenting vote stated "the Communist Party is subject to registration and taxation as an employer under the Unemployment Insurance Law. And, that being so, it follows that the Appellate Division was also correct in holding, in the proceeding instituted by the respondent Albertson, that he had met all qualifications under the law and was entitled to unemployment benefits."

=== Supreme Court Albertson v. Subversive Activities Control Board ===
On November 15, 1965, the Supreme Court ruled in Albertson v. Subversive Activities Control Board that persons (in this case, William Albertson) believed to be members of the Communist Party of the United States of America could not be required to register as party members with the Subversive Activities Control Board because the information which party members were required to submit could form the basis of their prosecution for being party members, which was then a crime, and therefore deprived them of their self-incrimination rights under the Fifth Amendment to the United States Constitution.

Winning Albertson v. Subversive Activities Control Board was one of John J. Abt's "greatest legal victories."

=== COINTELPRO, posthumous litigation, settlement ===
==== COINTELPRO ====
Redacted FBI policy manual on use of informants, which Albertson was branded following the FBI's "snitch jacket"

On June 25, 1964, the FBI planted a fake document ("like an informant's report") with a forged signature of Albertson's to make the Party believe he was an FBI informant.

FBI files record for June 24, 1964:

At approximately 1:00 AM 6/25/64, ALBERTSON was return to his automobile by [REDACTED] in [REDACTED] car. At 3:30 AM, after locating [REDACTED] car, agents gained entry to this vehicle and place the informant report in the front seat where ALBERTSON had been seated.

A June 30 document filed by the FBI's William C. Sullivan and Fred J. Baumgardner explains:

My memorandum dated 6/12/64 was approved, authorizing a unique counterintelligence operation calculated to cast suspicion on Communist Party (CP) National Committee member and Executive Secretary of the New York District Organization, William Albertson. It was our intentional to place Albertson in the unenviable position of being suspected as an FBI informant through the use of a planted bogus informant report prepared by the Laboratory in Albertson's handwriting on paper used by him with a ballpoint pen of the type he uses.

The June 30 document explains that the FBI had chosen Albertson because he was "considered one of the most efficient and capable functionaries." According to the June 30 document, the bogus document had already reached Gus Hall, secretary general of the Party, who was most concerned.

On July 7, 1964, the Party expelled Albertson and his wife and called him a "stool pigeon." The Party announced the expulsion on the final eighth page of its midweek edition of its newspaper, The Daily Worker, following a "thorough investigation" based on "irrefutable evidence." The Times quoted the conclusion of The Daily Worker that "Because the facts accumulated remove every shadow of doubt that Albertson lived a life o duplicity and treachery–posing as a dedicated defender of the workers' interests while in actuality betraying them–the Communist Party of New York State has expelled him." The news story was big enough to merit two separate articles in the New York Times that day.

Next day, Albertson stated, "I was framed by the FBI." He announced, "I never was, I am not now, and I never will be any kind of a police agent." He asserted, "The history of the F.B.I. shows that they will frame anyone if it suits a particular objective." An FBI spokesman had "no comment whatsoever" about Albertson's allegation.

The tactic is called placing a "snitch jacket" and worked as follows in Alberston's case:

William Albertson was a New York Communist party functionary. A dedicated Marxist since his youth, he was also a hardworking, effective party leader and as such became a prime target for the CPUSA COINTELPRO. The Bureau "neutrlized" Albertson by planting what appeared to be an FBI informant's report in his automobile.

The FBI followed the fallout, as related in a July 1964 report:

NY 100-129802

WILLIAM ALBERTSON

CONFIDENTIAL

The expulsion of WILLIAM ALBTERSON has presented the CP with a complex series of problems. There was a great deal of concern over the amount and quality of the information he presumably furnished to the FBI, and they discussed the steps they must take to minimize the damage. The leaders are concerned over the effect this will have on the membership and some members apparently have doubts that the Party chose the best course of action in this matter. It is difficult to overestimate the damage that has been caused.

As of this writing there continue to be new developments. A more comprehensive summary will be made of the ALBERTSON expulsion at the time of the next monthly letter.

The "snitch jacket" also asked the FBI for a raise, leading the Party to believe that Albertson he had been a paid FBI informer: as a result, the Party withdrew its scholarship for the Albertson's son. "Over a period of months, Albertson and his wife were the subjects of crank calls and personal harassment tactics. They were forced to change jobs and to move."

==== Posthumous litigation ====
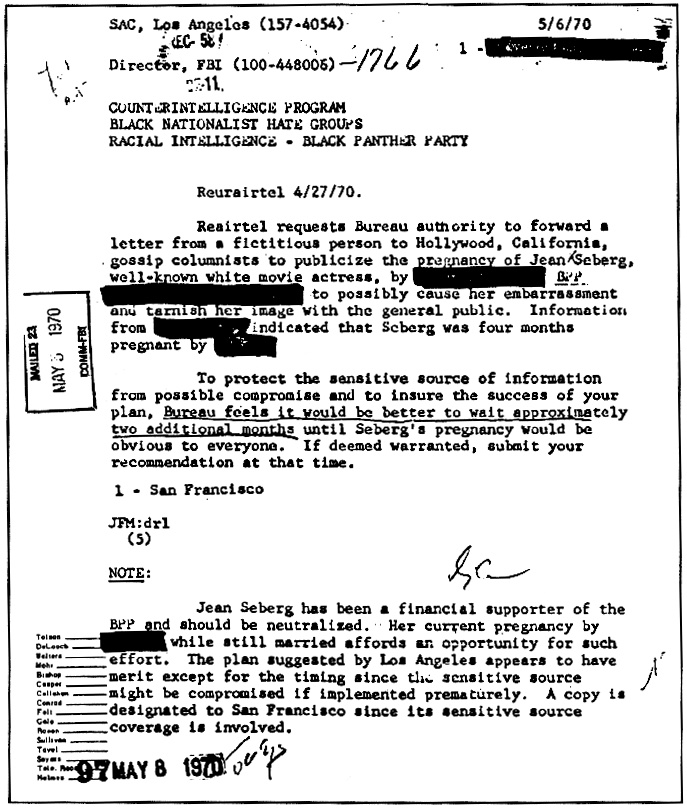
COINTELPRO went after Albertson (here, a memo proposing to expose pregnancy of actress Jean Seberg, financial supporter of the Black Panther Party, hoping to "possibly cause her embarrassment or tarnish her image with the general public"

In 1975, an FBI document released under the Freedom of Information Act revealed the FBI's 1964 act. The FOIA applicant was NBC News law correspondent Carl Stern.

In 1976, the New York Times correspondent Anthony Lewis wrote an article called "A Cointel Story," that related the fake document story. The article cited an article by Frank Donner of the American Civil Liberties Union (ACLU) in a forthcoming in the April–May issue of ACLU's Civil Liberties Review. Lewis related:

The truth came out by ironic mischance. Last year, a journalist asked the F.B.I. for documents about its past efforts to disrupt white hate groups such as the Ku Klux Klan. When the papers were released, one was on another subject.
It was a report to bureau officials, dated Jan. 6, 1965, that said a high functionary of the Communist Party had been expelled "through our counterintelligence efforts." The name of the "functionary" was deleted at the beginning ginning of the document. But, perhaps through clerical error in the release, it was left in farther down. The name was Albertson.

Lewis then commented:

The Albertson story is one small example of what went on in Cointelpro, the covert F.B.I. prcgram of J. Edgar Hoover's late years to injure those he disliked. Cointelpro has had less public attention than C.I.A. illegalities and abuses. But in a way was a special horror: an effort by the American Government to set Americans against each other... The need for openness is one lesson of Cointelpro. The other is the need for officials to respect the law. In the case of William Albertson, officials took it upon themselves to punish someone who had violated no law. His views were unpopular. But the principle we treasure in the Constitution, Justice Holmes said, is "not free thought for those who agree with us but freedom for the thought that we hate."

That same year, Donner showed Alberton's wife (by then, widow) the FBI files.

In 1977, Donner filed an administrative damages claim for Alberton's widow. By 1984, the ACLU filed a lawsuit for damages on her behalf: its resolution took 14 years. First, the government tried to have the case dismissed on national security grounds: both a federal district court and the Court of Appeals (District of Columbia Circuit) rejected the government's arguments.

==== Settlement ====
In October 1989, the Federal government agreed to pay Albertson's widow $170,000 to settle her claims out of court for a lawsuit against the FBI. Anthony Lewis of the New York Times again commented in an article called "Rule of Law?":

I do not know of any previous lawsuit in which the Government has agreed to make a payment to a victim of Mr. Hoover's illegal harassment. His program, known as Cointelpro, used anonymous letters and other devices to destroy the lives of civil rights workers as well as radicals.

In the process, Alberton's widow received more than 30,000 pages of FBI documents about the Albertson family.

== Personal life and death ==
On June 19, 1932, Albertson married Francene (Francine) Schneeberg in Brooklyn, from whom he separated on April 5, 1953; they had two sons. On June 10, 1955, he married Lillian ("Lillie") B. Lewis; she had joined the Party in 1948. In December 1961, they were living in a first-floor flat in Brooklyn with their son.

Albertson died aged 61 in 1972 from an accidental fall that broke his neck.

== Works ==
- Gear the Party to Mass Work: Report Delivered By William Albertson at the New York State Convention, Communist Party, November 26–28, 1959 (1959)

== See also ==
- Albertson v. Subversive Activities Control Board
- Steve Nelson (activist)
- COINTELPRO
- William C. Sullivan
- Frank Donner
- Communist Party of the USA
