= Emanuel H. Bloch =

American lawyer (1901–1954)

Emanuel Hirsch Bloch
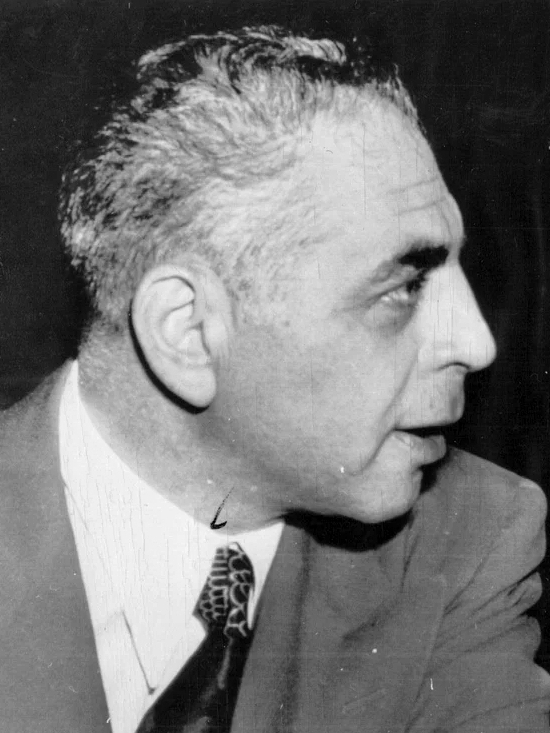
- Bloch in 1951
- Born: May 12, 1901; New York City, US
- Died: January 30, 1954 (aged 52); New York City, US
- Known for: Julius and Ethel Rosenberg; Trenton Six

Emanuel Hirsch Bloch (May 12, 1901 – January 30, 1954) was an American attorney known for defending clients associated with left-wing and Communist causes. He and Marshall Perlin defended Julius and Ethel Rosenberg.

== Background ==
He was born in 1901 to Alexander Bloch, an attorney, and Pauline Bloch. He graduated from City College of New York in 1920, before attending Columbia Law School.

== Career ==
Bloch worked as an attorney in New York from 1924 to 1942, then served in the U.S. Army during World War II.

=== Hiss Case ===
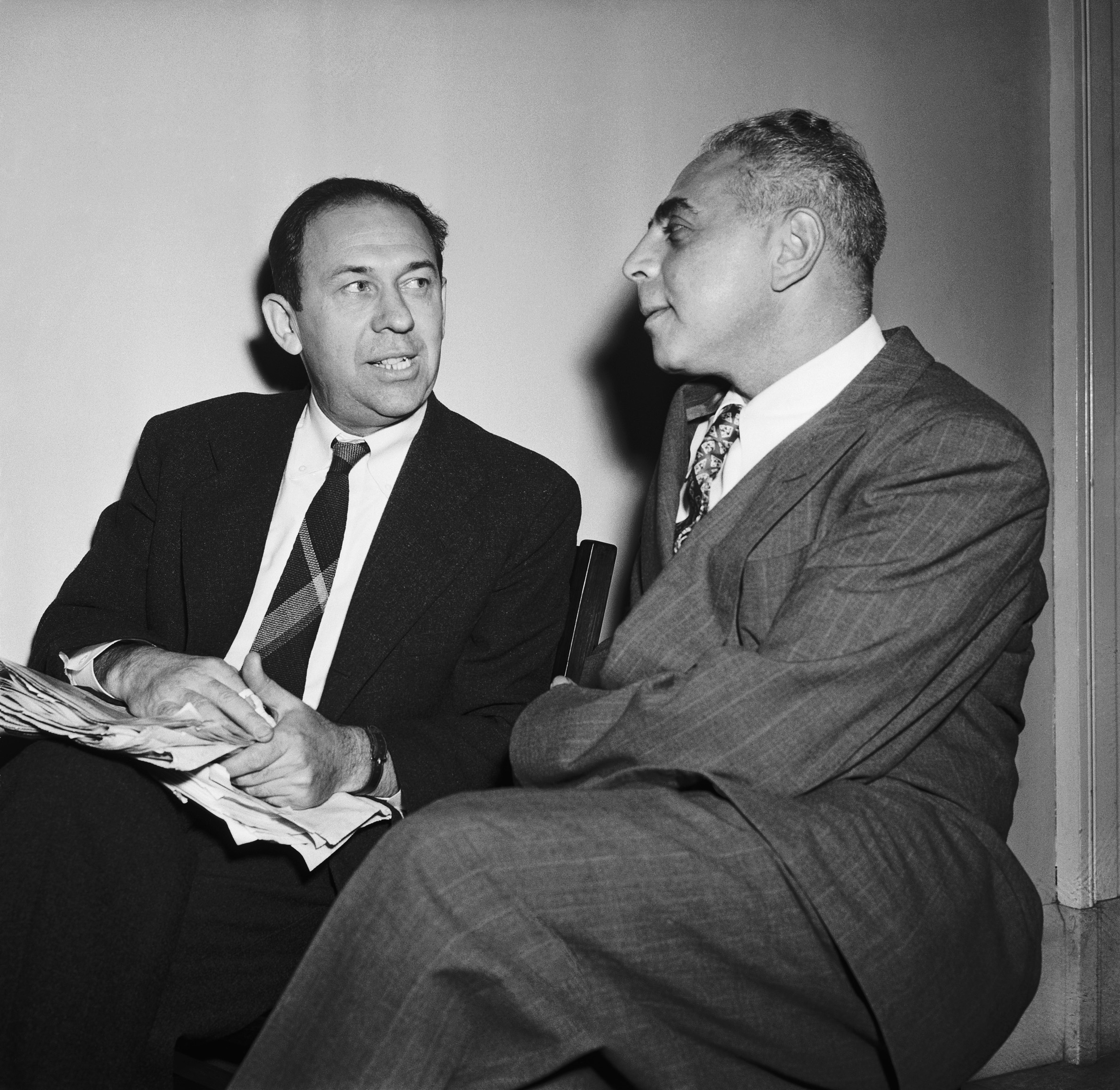
Bloch (right) with his client Steve Nelson, September 14, 1948

On December 14, 1948, Bloch appeared before the House Un-American Activities Committee (HUAC) as counsel for Marion Bachrach. On August 3, 1948, Whittaker Chambers alleged that she had been a member of the Ware group. She was born Marion Abt and was the sister of John Abt, another alleged member of that group (to whose membership Lee Pressman attested, though Abt himself never did). At the time of Bachrach's testimony, she stated she was a writer in the national office of the Communist Party of the USA in New York City, where she also lived. Under advice of counsel, she pled the Fifth Amendment (refused to answer any questions that might incriminate herself). At the time, Bloch himself answered questions that confirmed he had already represented Steve Nelson before the committee. Nelson was (according to a HUAC committee member) a "head of the Communist Party in western Pennsylvania, eastern Ohio, and northern West Virginia. He now lives in Harmarville, PA. I believe he served the Communist Party for a number of years as a sort of secretary of labor. He is an expert on so-called foreign groups and is currently working to keep the Tito Comimmists from jumping the line here as they did abroad."

=== Rosenberg case ===
He defended Julius and Ethel Rosenberg. Julius wrote to Bloch that Julius himself was "the first victim of American Fascism".

Two weeks before the date scheduled for their deaths, the Rosenbergs were visited by James V. Bennett, the Director of the Federal Bureau of Prisons. After the meeting they issued a statement:

Yesterday, we were offered a deal by the Attorney General of the United States. We were told that if we cooperated with the Government, our lives would be spared. By asking us to repudiate the truth of our innocence, the Government admits its own doubts concerning our guilt. We will not help to purify the foul record of a fraudulent conviction and a barbaric sentence. We solemnly declare, now and forever more, that we will not be coerced, even under pain of death, to bear false witness and to yield up to tyranny our rights as free Americans. Our respect for truth, conscience and human dignity is not for sale. Justice is not some bauble to be sold to the highest bidder. If we are executed it will be the murder of innocent people and the shame will be upon the Government of the United States.

== Personal life and death ==
Following execution of the Rosenbergs, Bloch delivered the eulogy at their funeral. He served as guardian for the Rosenberg's children, Michael and Robert, until they were adopted. He also defended the Trenton Six.

Bloch died of a heart attack at age 52 on January 30, 1954, in his Manhattan apartment.

== See also ==
- Steve Nelson (activist)
- Marion Bachrach
- Julius Rosenberg
