= Americans Battling Communism =

Americans Battling Communism Inc. (ABC) was an anti-communist organization created following an October 1947 speech by Pennsylvania Judge Blair Gunther that called for an "ABC movement" to educate America about communism. Chartered in November 1947 by Harry Alan Sherman, a local lawyer active in various anti-communist organizations, the group took part in such activities as blacklisting by disclosing the names of people suspected of being communists. Its members included local judges and lawyers active in the McCarthy-era prosecution of communists.

== History ==
Americans Battling Communism, Inc. (ABC) was conceived in Pittsburgh when anti-communists in Western Pennsylvania expressed anxiety over what they saw as the infiltration of "Reds" into the Croatian Fraternal Order, a Croatian American society. In October 1947, Blair Gunther, an anti-communist local judge, organized a meeting of fifty prominent locals to discuss ways of campaigning against similar communist infiltration. Gunther spoke of the need to "expose the Reds" through "education" in the form an "ABC movement," which inspired the name.

ABC was chartered by lawyer Harry Alan Sherman in November 1947 as a "non-profit organization to combat Communism." The charter called for an "aggressive program for enlightening American people as to the purpose, the methods, and the agencies of the Communist organizations to the end that an enlightened and alerted public. . . shall take steps, including. . . security legislation as may be necessary to eliminate the threat posed by Communism to the American way of life."

The organization soon began to identify Communists or "left-wing sympathizers," whose names the local newspapers then published. A number of these people were immigrants who were threatened with deportation. Others were forced out of their jobs.

When Matt Cvetic, an FBI informant with a deteriorating relationship with the FBI, approached newspaperman James Moore with the offer of telling his anti-communist stories in early 1950, the newsman put him in touch with Gunther and Sherman. ABC came up with financial and other support, with Sherman becoming Cvetic's attorney and manager.

Left wing historian Daniel Leab argues that the organization was foremost a tool employed by Sherman for his personal purposes: "for much of its existence Americans Battling Communism was not much more than a façade that Sherman used to enhance his own prestige: thus, a press release would be sent out by Sherman, identifying him as the 'chairman of Americans Battling Communism: who would address the members of (you name it) on 'Communists in Our Midst' (or a similar topic)."

The group's membership included several Pennsylvania judges presiding over McCarthy-era trials against communists. Steven Nelson, one of the communists sent to jail in the McCarthy-era prosecutions, recalled his sedition trial under Judge Harry M. Montgomery, a member of ABC:

I asked the judge to tell me if it wasn't a fact that he was one of the founders of the Americans Battling Communism, an organization which had demanded my arrest and circulated propaganda against me. Yes, he admitted that he was one of the officers, 'but at the present time inactive' (he meant while in the courtroom).
