= Trenton Six =

Six African-American men convicted of murder in a 1948 trial

Coordinates: 40.22307°N 74.76465°W

The Trenton Six was the group name of six African-American men arrested for murdering an elderly white shopkeeper in January 1948 in Trenton, New Jersey. In August of that year, an all-white jury convicted the six men of murder and sentenced them to death.

The case became a civil rights cause célèbre due to alleged injustices committed after the men's arrests as well as questions about the fairness of their trial. The NAACP and Civil Rights Congress dispatched legal teams to appeal the convictions to the New Jersey Supreme Court. The court found fault with the trial judge's jury instructions and remanded the case for retrial. The second trial in early 1951 ended in a mistrial. In the third trial, which concluded in June 1951, four of the defendants were acquitted. The other two, Collis English and Ralph Cooper, were again convicted of murder, but this time the jury recommended mercy – life in prison rather than execution.

Civil rights groups once more appealed to the state Supreme Court, which again found fault with the proceedings and ordered a retrial. Before that could occur, English died in prison in December 1952. Cooper then changed his plea from "not guilty" to "no defense" and implicated the other five men in the crime. He was given 6-10 years, and paroled in 1954 because of time served.

== Crime ==
On the morning of January 27, 1948, 72-year-old William Horner opened his second-hand furniture store as usual. It was located at 213 North Broad Street in downtown Trenton, and was connected to his living quarters. His common-law wife Elizabeth also worked in the store. Shortly after it opened, several young African-American men entered, saying they wanted to buy a mattress and stove. One or more of them killed Horner by beating him over the head with a soda bottle in the back room of the store. They robbed him of approximately $50. Mrs. Horner was knocked to the floor by the men, but she soon managed to crawl to the front door and call for help.

Frank Eldracher, a cigar salesman, was passing by, walking to his car. He saw Mrs. Horner in distress and ran to get the police. In subsequent questioning, she said that three light-skinned Negro teenagers had assaulted her and her husband. Eldracher testified that he observed two light-skinned Negroes come out of the store. Virginia Barclay, who lived across the street, said she witnessed three Negro teenagers "run from the direction of the store and jump into a four-door green 1936 Plymouth sedan in which a fourth youth was sitting."

== Arrests ==
On February 6, ten days after the murder, a 23-year-old World War II veteran, Collis English, was arrested for driving his father's two-door black 1938 Ford sedan without a license. What happened next became a source of legal dispute. According to the NAACP Legal Defense team, English was held in custody and grilled by Trenton police for 19 hours until he signed a confession:

When McKinley Forrest, 35, English's brother-in-law, came to police headquarters the next day to find out why English had failed to return home, he too was arrested. So were four others named by English in his "confession" – John McKenzie, 24; James Thorpe, 24; Ralph Cooper, 23; and Horace Wilson, 37. All six were kept incommunicado for four days and five nights, denied sleep, subjected to relentless interrogation, and threatened with violence if they did not "confess". Five of the six signed "confessions".

None of the arrested men resembled the witnesses' descriptions. All were dark-skinned black men in their 20s or 30s, not teenagers. Only Thorpe could be considered light-skinned, but he had just one arm, which none of the witnesses mentioned. Four of the six men had well-supported alibis. Nevertheless, all but one signed confessions.

== Trial ==
The trial began on June 7, 1948, when the State of New Jersey opened its case against the six men based on the five signed confessions obtained by the Trenton police. There was no other forensic evidence, and Horner's widow could not identify the men as the same ones who assaulted her and her husband. The two witnesses, Frank Eldracher and Virginia Barclay, also could not positively identify the accused as the young men they saw exiting the store.

The defendants were assigned four attorneys. In the course of the trial, the defense argued that the six defendants had alibis for the day of the murder—three of the six were at work at the time—and had repudiated their confessions, which were signed "under duress". The defense further alleged that evidence had been manufactured against the defendants. The Trenton medical examiner was later found guilty of perjury.

On August 6, 1948, the all-white jury deliberated for 7 and 1/2 hours and came back with a verdict of guilty. The Trenton Six were sentenced to death in the electric chair. An appeal was filed and an automatic stay of execution granted.

== Appeal ==
The movement to appeal and overturn the convictions was initiated by Bessie Mitchell, sister of Collis English. She sent a letter to former first lady Eleanor Roosevelt, and embarked on a public speaking campaign to raise awareness about the case. Mitchell "crisscrossed the eastern states to speak—in kitchens, church basements, union halls, and once, memorably, to an audience of 17,000 in Madison Square Garden—to anyone who might help save her baby brother and his fellow prisoners."

In October 1948 in the left-wing New York City newspaper National Guardian, investigative journalist William A. Reuben published an exposé, "Is There a 'Scottsboro Case' in Trenton, New Jersey?", that brought the salient details of the Trenton Six to a wider audience. The Communist Party USA (CPUSA) then got involved through its Civil Rights Congress (CRC), which took on the legal defense of half the defendants, with Emanuel Hirsch Bloch acting as their attorney. The NAACP defended the other three men, seeking to get their convictions overturned. Among the NAACP attorneys were Thurgood Marshall, who would become the first African American on the U.S. Supreme Court; and Raymond Pace Alexander, later named to the Pennsylvania Court of Common Pleas.

In July 1949, the state Supreme Court ruled that there had been improprieties in the trial court's actions and ordered a new trial.

== Outcome ==
After the second trial ended in mistrial in February 1951, a third trial commenced. In June 1951, four of the Trenton Six were acquitted. Collis English and Ralph Cooper were still found guilty, but given life imprisonment rather than capital punishment. These two convictions were also appealed. In late November 1952, the New Jersey Supreme Court once again ruled that the trial court had erred. It remanded the case to the lower court for a fourth trial to occur.

English, who contracted malaria and rheumatic fever while serving in the Navy and suffered damage to his heart, died in prison on December 31, 1952, of a heart attack.

In a court appearance in February 1953, Cooper surprisingly changed his plea from "not guilty" to "no defense". He then proceeded to implicate the other five men in the crime. His life sentence was reduced to six to ten years. Because he had already been serving time in jail since his February 1948 arrest, he was released on parole in 1954.

== Legacy ==
For several years starting in 1949, the Trenton Six case achieved international notoriety. The Civil Rights Congress and NAACP had generated publicity to highlight racial inequities in the railroading of the suspects, their lack of access to counsel, and the chief witness' inability to identify them. Figures ranging from Paul Robeson to W.E.B. DuBois, Arthur Miller, Pete Seeger, and Albert Einstein joined the campaign to protest what they viewed as a grave injustice. Commentary and protests were issued from many countries. In the We Charge Genocide petition presented to the United Nations in 1951, the Trenton Six case was cited as one of the wrongs done to the Negro people.

But then, as Cathy Knepper notes in her 2011 book Jersey Justice, the case began to fade from public consciousness. She attributes the change to Ralph Cooper's plea deal in February 1953—and its suggestion that most if not all of the six men were probably guilty—and the involvement in the appeal process of the CPUSA-affiliated Civil Rights Congress during the McCarthy era when "anything associated with Communists became anathema". It was not until decades later that the Trenton Six case came to be regarded as a significant precursor to the U.S. Civil Rights Movement.

== The accused ==
- Ralph Cooper (1924-?), convicted in the third trial. In a court appearance in February 1953, he pleaded "no defense" and was sentenced to 6-10 years, retroactive to the time of his original arrest in February 1948. After being paroled in 1954, he disappeared from records.
- Collis English (1925–1952), convicted in the third trial. He died in prison of a heart attack on December 31, 1952.
- McKinley Forrest (1913–1982), acquitted in the third trial. He was the brother-in-law of Collis English.
- John McKenzie (1925-?), acquitted in the third trial.
- James Henry Thorpe Jr. (1913–1955), acquitted in the third trial. He died in a car crash on March 25, 1955.
- Horace Wilson (1911–2000), acquitted in the third trial.

== Timeline ==
- January 27, 1948: William Horner, a 72-year-old junk shop dealer, is killed and his common-law wife beaten in Trenton, New Jersey on January 27. Although police allege the motive was robbery, more than $1,600 is discovered in Horner's pockets.
- January 27-31, 1948: Trenton police officers, under the direction of Andrew J. Duch, the city's former mayor (1943-1947) and director of public safety, patrol black neighborhoods and detain and question random black men. By January 31, twenty have been arrested because of the sweep.
- February 1948: The Trenton police arrest six black men, questioning them without access to attorneys. Five of the six sign confessions on February 11 and are charged with Horner's murder.
- June 7, 1948: The State of New Jersey opens its case against the six based on the five signed confessions. The defendants are assigned four court-appointed attorneys.
- August 6, 1948: All six men are found guilty and sentenced to death. All had provided alibis for the time of the crime and repudiated their confessions. The defense raised serious doubts about the legality of the confessions. An appeal is filed with the state Supreme Court and an automatic stay of execution granted.
- 1948: Bessie Mitchell, sister of Collis English, starts a public speaking tour questioning the trial. The Civil Rights Congress, the legal arm of the Communist Party, hires lawyers O. John Rogge, William Patterson and Solomon Golat to file appeals for three of the men, with the goal of overturning their convictions. The NAACP assigns lawyers to represent the other three members of the Trenton Six, seeking the same goal.
- 1949: Communist Party USA, American Civil Liberties Union, the Civil Rights Congress, and the NAACP all work in support of the appeal.
- July 1949: The state Supreme Court remands the case to the lower court for retrial.
- February 6, 1951: After the second trial begins, Prosecutor Mario Volpe is hospitalized with an emergency appendectomy, causing the judge to announce a mistrial.
- March 5, 1951: Third trial begins.
- June 14, 1951: Four of the defendants are acquitted. Collis English and Ralph Cooper are found guilty and sentenced to life imprisonment.
- June 29, 1951: Superior Court judge denies initial request for a retrial for English and Cooper.
- September 11, 1951: Another appeal is made to the New Jersey Supreme Court for the two remaining defendants.
- November 1952: The state Supreme Court orders a new trial for English and Cooper.
- December 31, 1952: English dies in prison of a heart attack.
- February 1953: Ralph Cooper pleads "no defense" and is sentenced to 6-10 years in prison.
- 1954: Cooper is paroled early based on previous time served.
- 1955: Former defendant James Henry Thorpe Jr. dies in a car crash on March 25.

== See also ==
- Scottsboro Boys
- Jena Six
