= Joseph Weinberg =

American physicist (1917–2002)

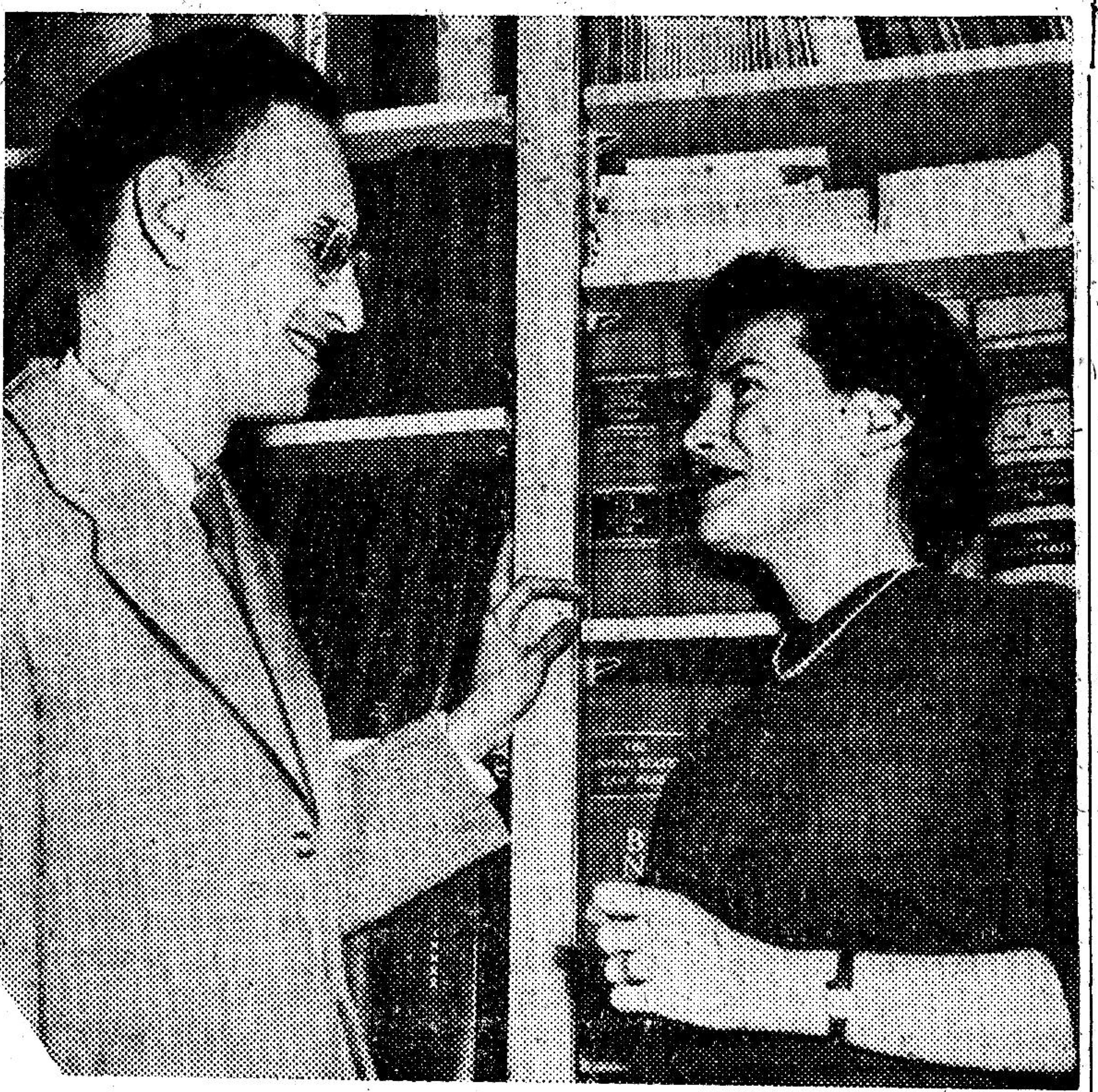
- Joseph Weinberg and his wife Merle in 1953
- Born: Joseph Woodrow Weinberg; January 19, 1917; Maspeth, New York, U.S.
- Died: October 22, 2002 (aged 85); Syracuse, New York, U.S.
- Education: City College of New York (BS); University of Wisconsin–Madison (MS); University of California, Berkeley (PhD)
- Spouse: Merle Hoesly
- Children: 2
- Scientific career
- Workplaces: University of California, Berkeley; University of Minnesota; House of Vision; Western Reserve University; Syracuse University
- Doctoral advisor: J. Robert Oppenheimer

Joseph Woodrow Weinberg (January 19, 1917 – October 22, 2002) was an American physicist. After the Second World War Weinberg was accused by the House Un-American Activities Committee of spying on behalf of the Soviet Union, and was later charged with perjury, but was acquitted. At the time of his death he was an emeritus professor at Syracuse University.

== Biography ==
Joseph Woodrow Weinberg was born January 19, 1917, in Maspeth, Queens, New York City. His parents were Jewish emigrants from Poland, his father working as a printing press engineer and a translator. Weinberg began studying at the Community College of New York when he was 15, alongside his friend Julian Schwinger. Weinberg graduated with a bachelor of science in physics when he was 19.

Weinberg studied at the University of Wisconsin–Madison from 1938 to 1939 where he met his future wife Merle Hoesly and graduated with a master's degree. In 1939 he began working on a PhD at the University of California, Berkeley, where his doctoral advisor was J. Robert Oppenheimer. After completing his PhD in 1943 he taught at Berkeley until 1947. During World War II Weinberg worked at Berkeley's Radiation Laboratory as part of the secret Manhattan Project, developing the atomic bomb.

In 1948 he was appointed an associate professor of physics at the University of Minnesota, where his work included research with Gerald Tauber on the gravitational stability of white dwarfs.

In 1949 the Un-American Activities Committee of the United States House of Representatives opened an investigation into Weinberg. He was accused of being "Scientist X", alleging that he had been sharing atomic secrets with the Soviet Union via communist activist Steve Nelson. In 1951 Weinberg was fired from the University of Minnesota on the recommendation of university president James Morrill. In 1952 he was accused of lying to the committee and indicted for perjury. The federal court trial was held in 1953. It has been argued that the original goal of this prosecution and trial were to compel Oppenheimer himself to testify and possibly perjure himself. In the end Oppenheimer was not called to testify. Two charges against Weinberg were dropped and he was acquitted of a third charge. Nonetheless, Weinberg was not reinstated by the university.

Weinberg briefly worked for the American Institute of Physics on the journal Physical Review. In 1953 he began working in the private sector, taking a position at House of Vision, a Chicago-based optics company, followed by the Pioneer Scientific Company. In 1957 Weinberg returned to academia, working at Western Reserve University where his research included work on gravitational theory, magnetic resonance and optics. In 1963 he won the Gravity Research Foundation award.

In 1970 he accepted an endowed professorship at Syracuse University, where he remained until his retirement in 1984 when he was appointed professor emeritus.

Weinberg died from cancer October 22, 2002, in Syracuse at the age of 85.
