= Marshall Perlin =

American civil liberties lawyer

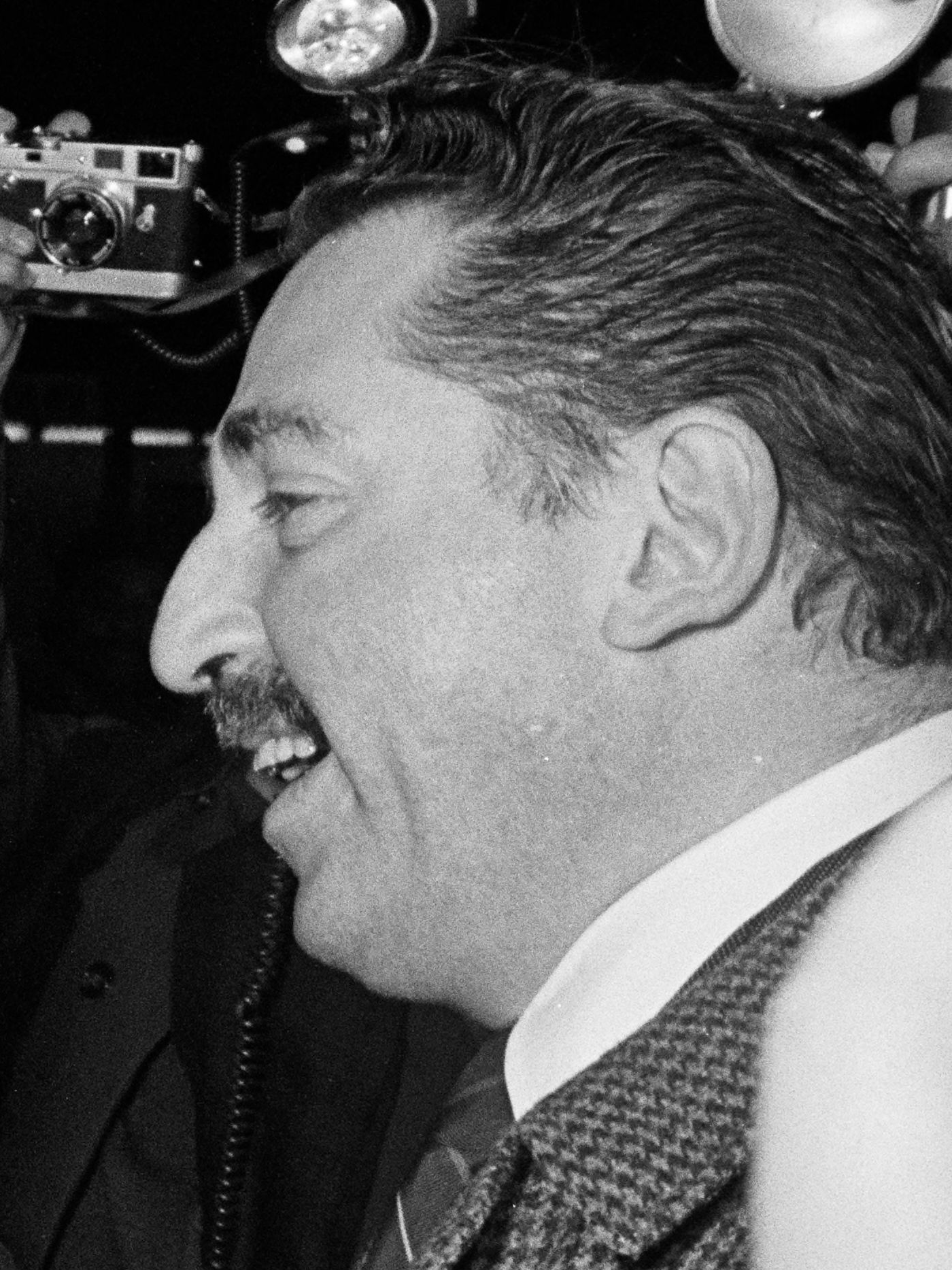
- Perlin in 1969
- Born: August 23, 1920; Manhattan
- Died: December 31, 1998 (aged 78); New York Hospital-Cornell Medical Center; Manhattan
- Education: Rutgers University; Columbia Law School (1942)
- Spouse: Loretta Rowe
- Children: Hank Perlin; Jan Perlin

Marshall Perlin (August 23, 1920 – December 31, 1998) was a civil-liberties lawyer, who along with Emanuel Hirsch Bloch, defended Julius and Ethel Rosenberg. He came to the trial after the sentencing, during the appeal process.

== Background ==
Perlin was born on August 23, 1920, in Manhattan and later graduated from Rutgers University. He completed Columbia Law School in 1942, but his degree was not conferred until 1947 while he served in World War II.

== Career ==
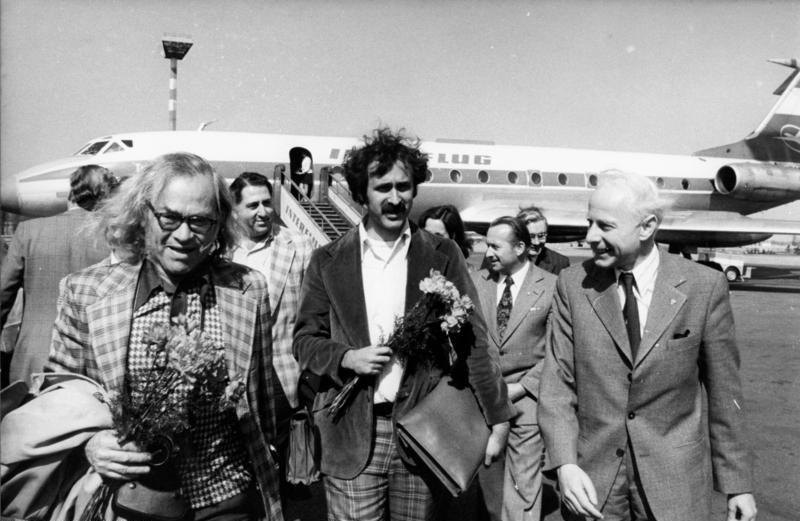
Robert Meeropol (center) visits East Berlin, East Germany, accompanied by Morton Sobell (left), Perlin (second from left, behind) and Franz Loeser (right), April 19, 1976

Perlin represented Michael Meeropol and Robert Meeropol, the children of Julius and Ethel Rosenberg after the Rosenbergs were sentenced. He was the trial lawyer for Morton Sobell, the Rosenbergs' co-defendant.

== Personal life and death ==
He died on December 31, 1998.

== See also ==
- Morton Sobell
- Frank Donner
- Arthur Kinoy
