= Albertson v. Subversive Activities Control Board =

- Supreme Court of the United States

Argued October 18, 1965 Decided November 15, 1965
- Full case name: Albertson, et al. v. Subversive Activities Control Board
- Citations: 382 U.S. 70 (more) 86 S. Ct. 194; 15 L. Ed. 2d 165; 1965 U.S. LEXIS 263

Holding
- Persons believed to be members of the Communist Party of the United States of America could not be required to register as party members with the SACB because that would violate their self-incrimination rights under the Fifth Amendment.

Court membership
- Chief Justice Earl Warren Associate Justices Hugo Black · William O. Douglas; Tom C. Clark · John M. Harlan II; William J. Brennan Jr. · Potter Stewart; Byron White · Abe Fortas

Case opinions
- Majority: Brennan, joined by Warren, Black, Douglas, Clark, Harlan, Stewart, Fortas
- Concurrence: Black
- Concurrence: Clark
- White took no part in the consideration or decision of the case.

Laws applied
- U.S. Const. amend. V

Albertson v. Subversive Activities Control Board, 382 U.S. 70 (1965), was a case in which the Supreme Court of the United States ruled on November 15, 1965, that persons (in this case, William Albertson) believed to be members of the Communist Party of the United States of America could not be required to register as party members with the Subversive Activities Control Board because the information which party members were required to submit could form the basis of their prosecution for being party members, which is a crime, and therefore deprived them of their self-incrimination rights under the Fifth Amendment to the United States Constitution.

== See also ==
- Communist Party v. Subversive Activities Control Board, 351 U.S. 115 (1956) and 367 U.S. 1 (1961)
- United States v. Sullivan, 274 U.S. 259 (1927)
- William Albertson
