= Morton Sobell =

American spy for the Soviet Union (1917–2018)

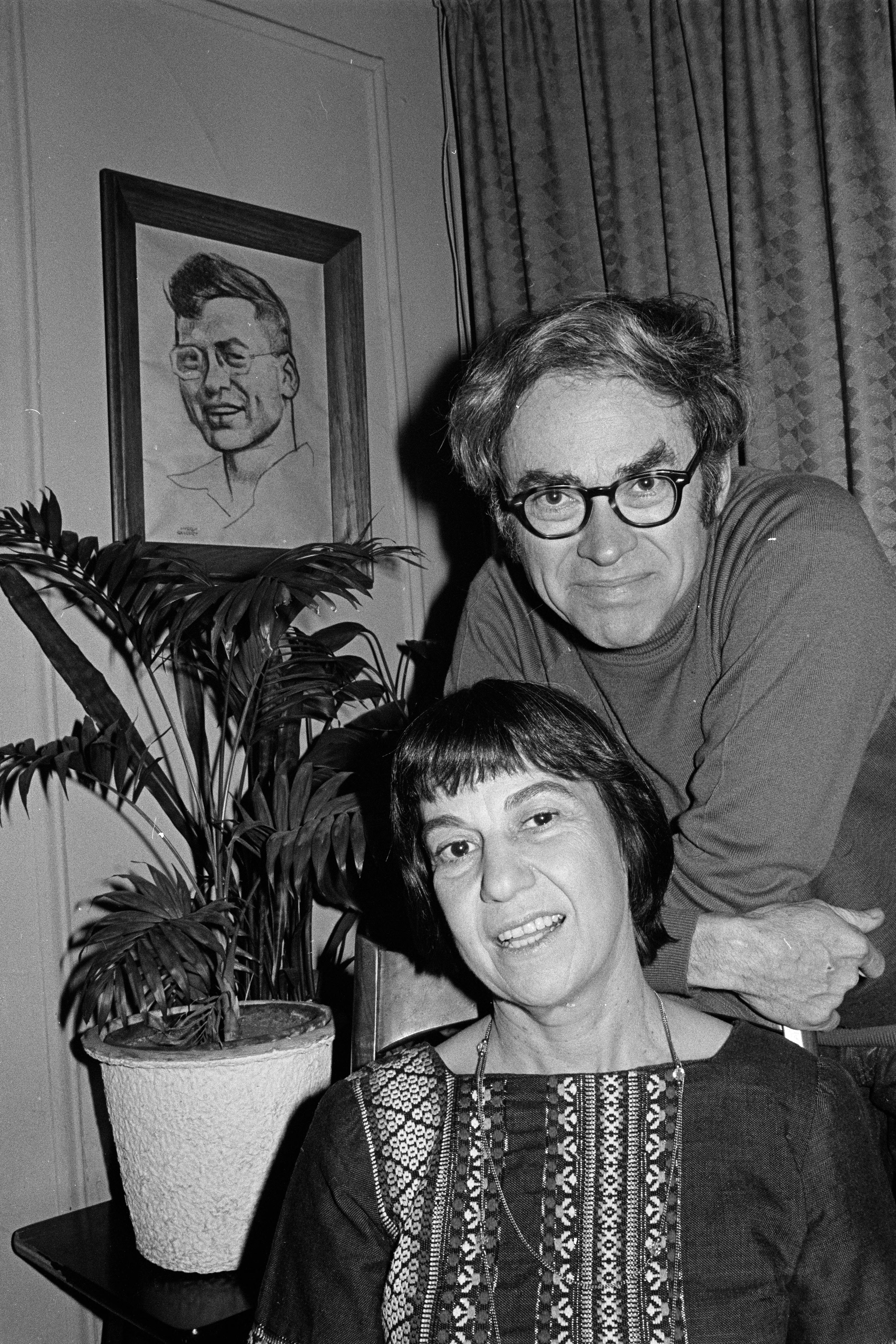
- Sobell (top) with his wife Helen shortly after his release from prison, March 2, 1969. In the back is a portrait of Sobell by Hugo Gellert.
- Born: April 11, 1917; New York City, U.S.
- Died: December 26, 2018 (aged 101); New York City, U.S.
- Occupation: Electrical engineer
- Spouses: Helen Levitov (m. 1945; div. 1980) Nancy Gruber (m. 1993; died 2018)
- Children: 1 son and 1 stepdaughter
- Conviction: Conspiracy to commit espionage (50 U.S.C. § 32)
- Penalty: 30 years imprisonment

Morton Sobell (April 11, 1917 – December 26, 2018) was an American engineer and Soviet spy during and after World War II; he was charged as part of a conspiracy which included Julius Rosenberg and his wife, Ethel Rosenberg. Sobell worked on military and government contracts with General Electric and Reeves Instrument Corporation in the 1940s, including during World War II. Sobell was tried and convicted of espionage in 1951 and sentenced to 30 years in prison.

He was released in 1969 after serving 17 years and 9 months in prison. After that he became an advocate of socialist causes, conducting public speaking and traveling to Vietnam (during the war), to East Germany (before the fall of the Soviet Union), and to Cuba.

== Early life and career ==
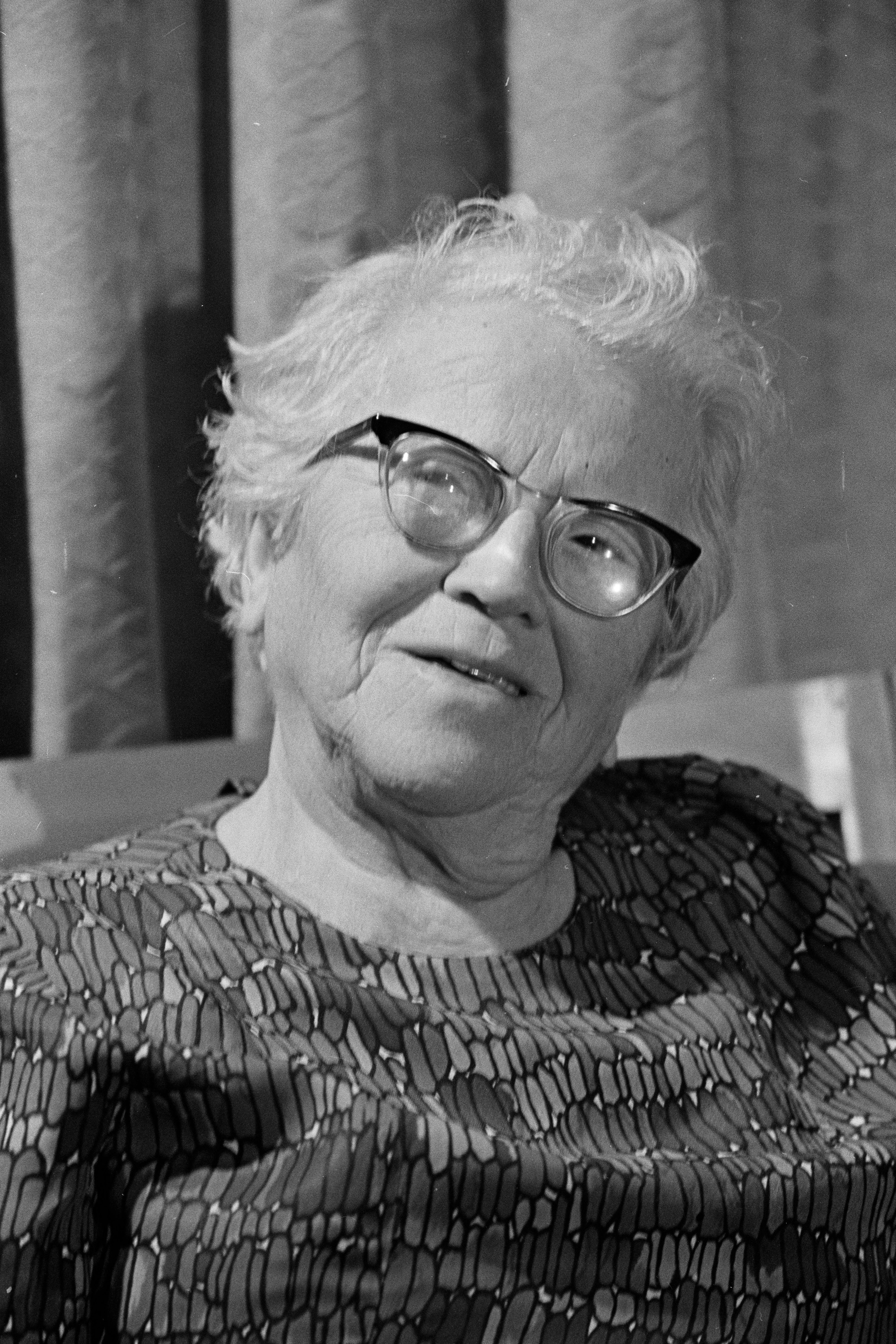
Sobell's mother Rose, January 14, 1969

Morton Sobell was born in New York City to Jewish immigrant parents Louis and Rose Sobel, who came in 1906 from the small village of Belozerka, Russian Empire (today in Ukraine). He attended public schools and Stuyvesant High School. He graduated from the City College of New York where he received a degree in engineering.

Sobell began work in 1939 in Washington, D.C., for the Navy Bureau of Ordnance. In 1943 he took a job with General Electric Company, which had major defense contracts, in Schenectady, New York.

== Career as a spy ==
According to NKGB agent Alexander Feklisov, Sobell was recruited as a spy in the summer of 1944, during World War II, at a time when the Soviet Union and the United States were allies. "Sobell... was deferred from active military service because he was a top specialist in his field... When I asked him if he could microfilm his own documents, he replied it was not a problem since he knew photography quite well. At our next meeting I brought him a camera with the necessary accessories and a small stock of film."

In June 1944, Max Elitcher claimed he was phoned by Julius Rosenberg, whom he had known slightly at college and had not seen in six years. Elitcher later recalled: "I remembered the name, I recalled who it was, and he said he would like to see me. He came over after supper, and my wife was there and we had a casual conversation. After that he asked if my wife would leave the room, that he wanted to speak to me in private." Rosenberg allegedly said that many people were aiding the Soviet Union "by providing classified information about military equipment". Rosenberg said that Morton Sobell was "also helping in this".

At the beginning of September 1944, Elitcher and his wife went on holiday with Sobell and his fiancée Helen Levitov. Elitcher told his friend of Rosenberg's visit and his disclosure that "you, Sobell, were also helping in this." According to Elitcher, Sobell became very angry and said "he should not have mentioned my name. He should not have told you that." Elitcher claimed that Rosenberg tried to recruit him again in September 1945. Rosenberg told Elitcher "that even though the war was over there was a continuing need for new military information for Russia."

In 1945 Sobell married Helen Levitov (1918–2002), who brought her daughter Sydney Gurewitz, born during her previous marriage. The new couple soon had a son Mark together.

After David Greenglass, Ethel Rosenberg's brother, was arrested on charges of espionage, Sobell and his family fled to Mexico on June 22, 1950. He fled with his wife Helen, infant son Mark Sobell, and Helen's daughter Sydney from her previous marriage. They lived under assumed names. Sobell tried to travel to Europe, but without proper papers he was not able to leave. On August 16, 1950, Sobell and his family were abducted by armed men, taken to the United States border and turned over to the FBI. The FBI arrested him for conspiring with Julius Rosenberg to violate espionage laws.

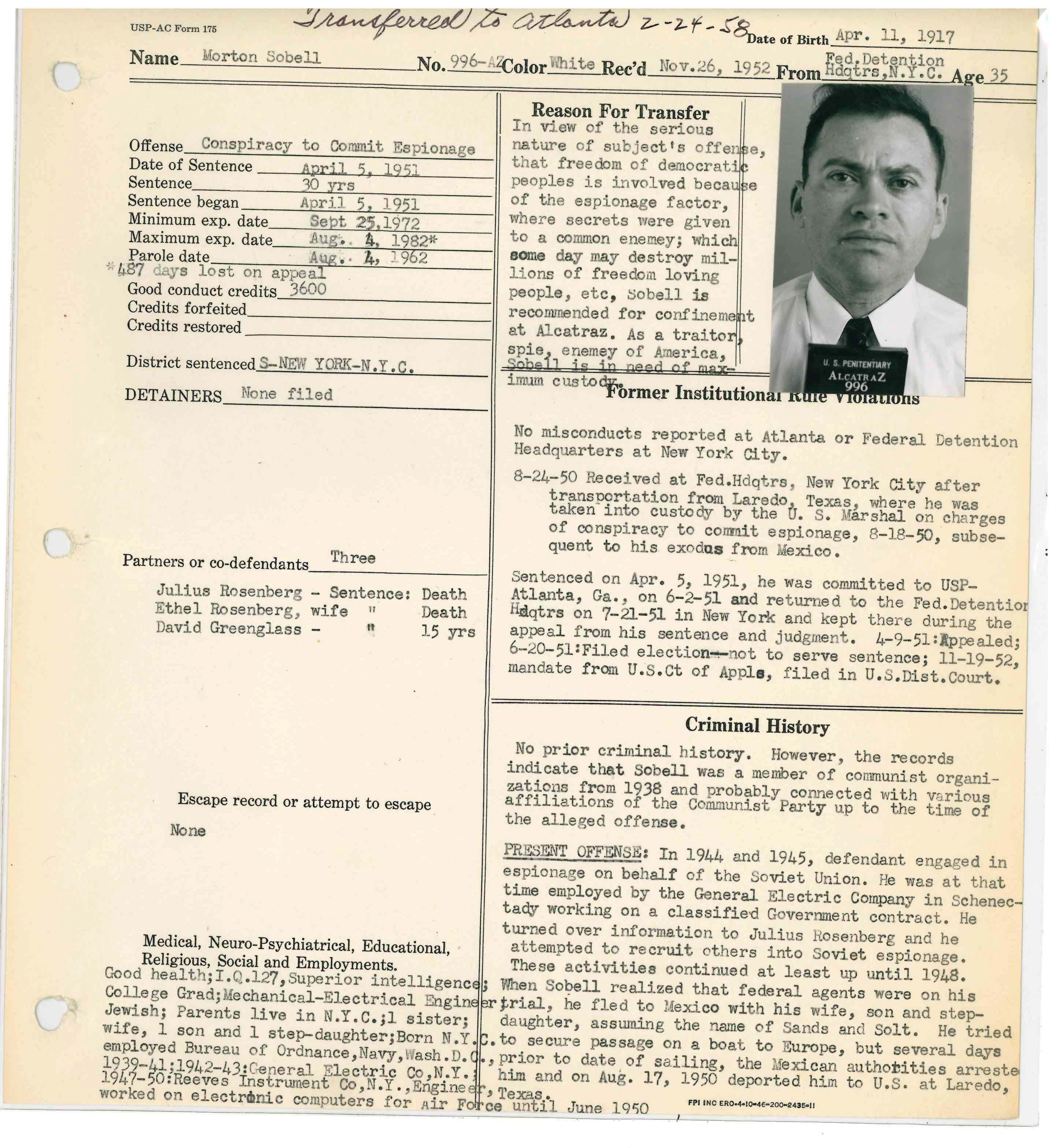
Morton Sobell's Alcatraz file

There were many questions raised by progressive intellectuals about the Rosenberg and Sobell cases. He was tried and found guilty along with the Rosenbergs and sentenced to 30 years. Both the Rosenbergs were executed. His wife Helen Sobell had worked with others to have the Rosenbergs spared from execution. She continued to work for more than 15 years to gain her husband's freedom. She contributed to eight appeals of his conviction on the merits, but these were unsuccessful. During this time, she taught science at the private Elizabeth Irwin School, a private high school in Greenwich Village. Sobell was initially sent to Alcatraz but was transferred to Lewisburg Penitentiary when that prison closed in 1963.

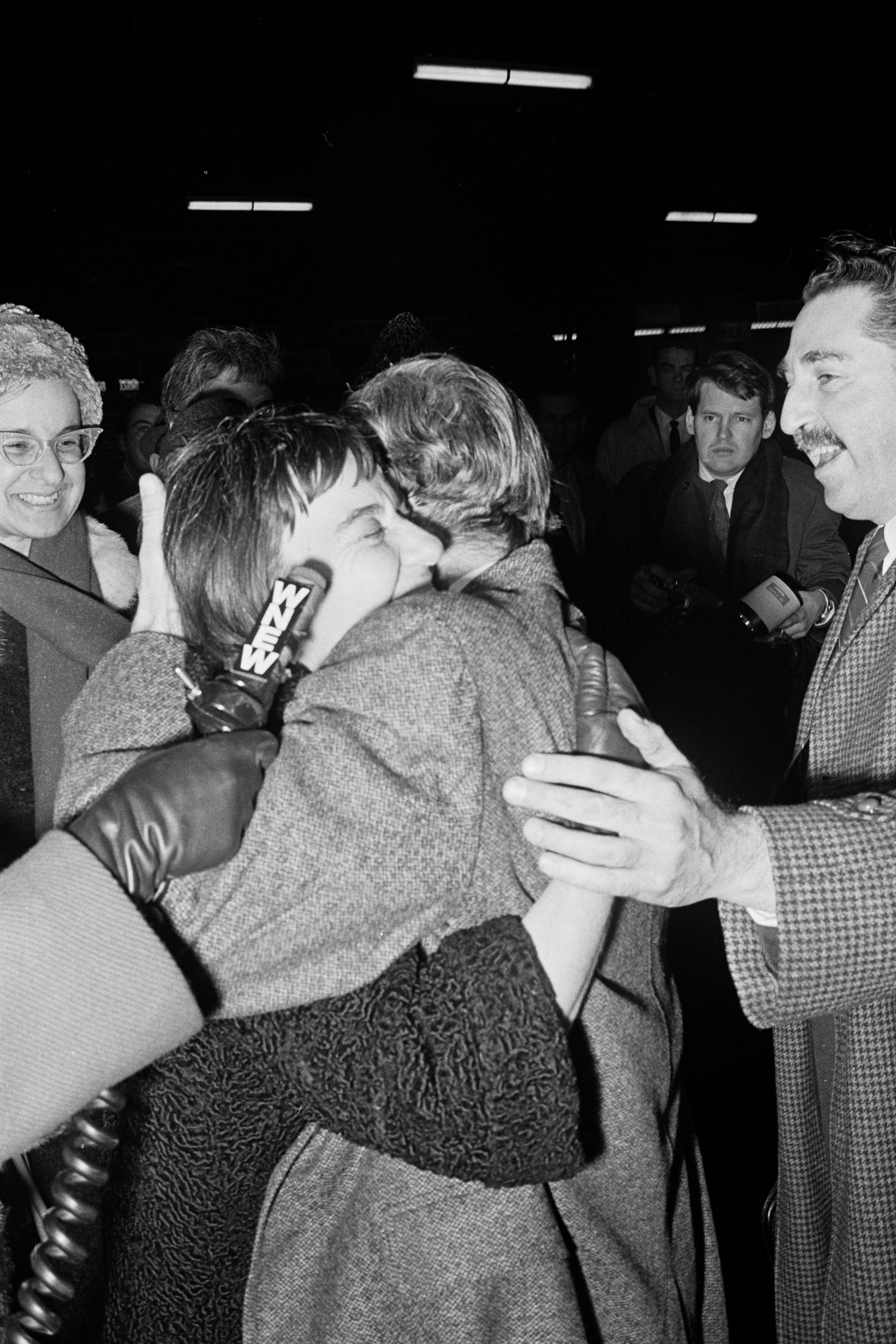
Sobell embraces his wife Helen after his release from prison, January 14, 1969

Sobell was released in 1969 after serving 17 years and 9 months. It was seven and a half months before he was eligible for parole because the Circuit Court of Appeals gave him credit for the time he was in jail after his arrest and before his trial. His bail had been set at $100,000, which he could not raise.

== Sobell as political cause ==
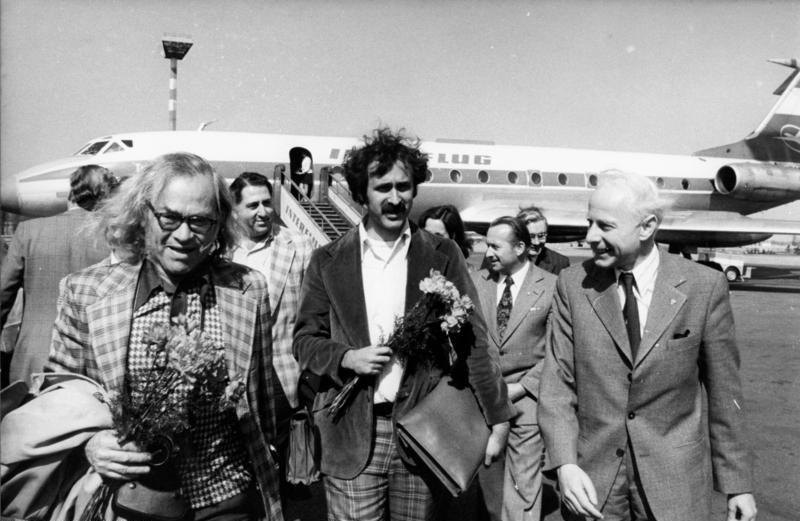
Robert Meeropol (center) visits East Berlin, East Germany, accompanied by Sobell (left), Marshall Perlin (second from left, behind) and Franz Loeser (right), April 19, 1976

After his release from prison, Sobell went on the speaker circuit, regaling audiences with his account of being falsely prosecuted and convicted by the federal government. Sobell's claim of innocence became a cause among left-wing intellectuals, who organized a Committee to Secure Justice for Morton Sobell. In 1974, Sobell published a memoir, On Doing Time, in which he maintained that he was innocent and that his conviction was a case of justice being subverted to serve political goals. In 1978 the Corporation for Public Broadcasting produced a television special that maintained Sobell was innocent of the government charges. Lawrence Kaplan, a relative-in-law of Sobell's, wrote in a review of On Doing Time that "although the prosecution presented absolutely no proof that Sobell had any connection with atomic bomb research, he was conjoined as a co-defendant with the Rosenbergs to give the impression that an extensive spy ring had been in operation." In a letter to the editor of The Nation in 2001, Sobell referred to himself as a "bona fide convicted spy".

== Final admission of guilt ==
In September 2008, the National Archives released most of the grand jury testimony from the prosecution of the conspiracy case against the Rosenbergs and Sobell, in response to a suit by the National Security Archive, historians and journalists. Sobell, then 91, was interviewed by The New York Times about the case, as he was the only surviving primary figure other than David Greenglass. He was asked if he had given military secrets to the Soviets during World War II (then a war-time ally of the United States). He made the distinction that he had passed only material about defensive radar and artillery devices. This was the first time he had acknowledged his espionage activities. Reporter Sam Roberts pointed out that military experts contended that one device Sobell mentioned in the interview was later used against US military aircraft during the Korean and Vietnam wars. By that time, the Cold War was long underway, and the Soviet Union was considered an enemy of the US. Sobell also said that his co-defendant Julius Rosenberg had been involved in spying:

In the interview with The New York Times, Mr. Sobell, who lives in the Riverdale neighborhood of the Bronx, was asked whether, as an electrical engineer, he turned over military secrets to the Soviets during World War II when they were considered allies of the United States and were bearing the brunt of Nazi brutality. Was he, in fact, a spy? "Yeah, yeah, yeah, call it that," he replied. "I never thought of it as that in those terms."

Like the Rosenbergs, at the time of the events for which he was tried, Sobell was a committed communist. In 2018, he told The Wall Street Journal, "I bet on the wrong horse."

== Personal life and death ==
In 1945, Sobell married Helen Levitov. She brought her daughter, Sydney Gurewitz, from her first marriage, and the couple had a son Mark together. They divorced in 1980. Helen Sobell died in 2002.

In 1990, Sobell met Nancy Gruber. They married in 1993 and he survived her death in 2018. They lived in the Riverdale section of the Bronx. Sobell died at the age of 101 on December 26, 2018. He was the last surviving member of the Rosenberg spy ring.

== Articles/books ==
- Morton Sobell (2001). On doing time. San Francisco, Calif: Golden Gate National Parks Association. ISBN 1-883869-53-6. LCCN 2002728292. OCLC 51242542. OL 3671101M.
- Evanier, David. 'The Death of Morton Sobell and the End of the Rosenberg Affair', online Mosaic, June 3, 2019.

== See also ==
- Atomic spies
