= Greenglass =

Greenglass is a surname. Notable people with the surname include:

- David Greenglass (1922–2014), American machinist and Soviet spy
- Menachem Zeev Greenglass (1917–2010), Polish-Canadian rabbi
- Ruth Greenglass (1924–2008), née Printz, wife of David Greenglass who spied for the Soviet Union
