= Leonid Kvasnikov =

Russian chemical engineer and spy (1905–1993)

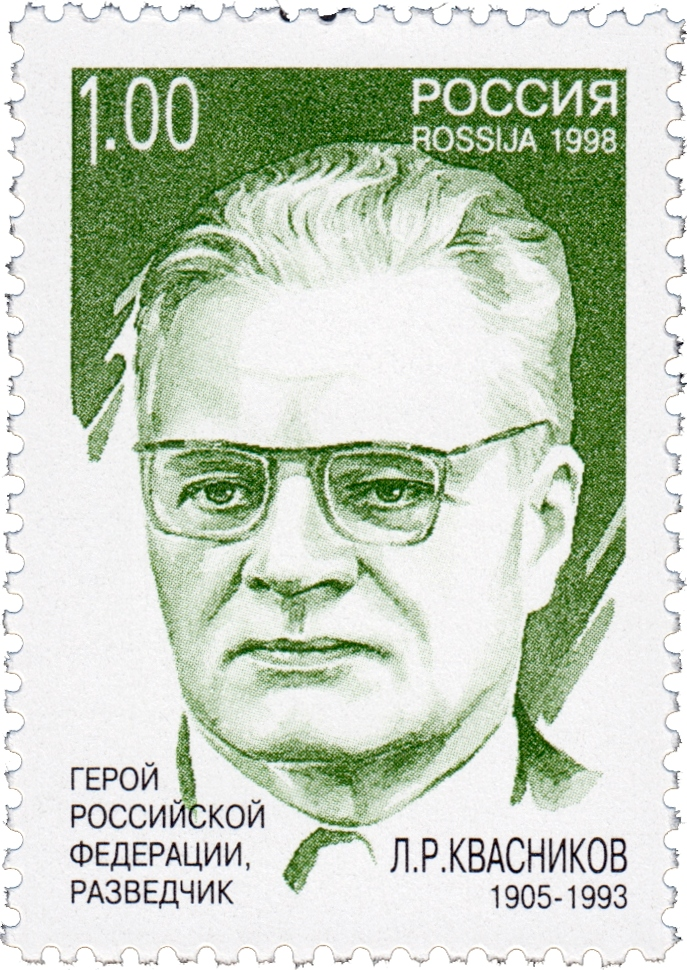
- Kvasnikov on a 1998 Russian stamp
- Born: Leonid Romanovich Kvasnikov; 2 June 1905; Uzlovaya, Tula Governorate, Russian Empire
- Died: 15 October 1993 (aged 88); Moscow, Russia
- Occupation: Spy
- Awards: Hero of the Russian Federation (1996); Order of Lenin; 2×Order of the Red Banner of Labour; 3×Order of the Red Star

Leonid Romanovich Kvasnikov (Russian: Леонид Романович Квасников; 2 June 1905 – 15 October 1993) was a Soviet and Russian chemical engineer and a spy, serving first in NKVD and later served in KGB. Graduated with honors from the Moscow Institute of Chemical Machine-Building in 1934 and worked as an engineer in a chemical plant for several years in the Tula region. Kvasnikov continued postgraduate engineering studies and joined the KGB in 1938 as a specialist in scientific-technical intelligence. Beginning in 1939 he was the section head of scientific and technical intelligence. Kvasnikov served a few short-term assignments in Germany and Poland and rising swiftly to become deputy chief and then chief of the KGB scientific intelligence section.

== Early career ==
Kvasnikov was one of the initiators of work in foreign intelligence on the atomic line in 1940 when he noticed that British, American, and German scientists who had regularly published their findings on uranium and related atomic research had ceased to publish. Kvasnikov supervised from Moscow the initial KGB penetration of the British and American atomic bomb projects.

In 1943 he went to New York City under diplomatic cover as the deputy of the Rezident. Kvasnikov is noted for his high professional level, a fundamental understanding of the problems of scientific and technical intelligence. Under his management were obtained the most important materials on nuclear power and its use for military purposes, and also the information and equipment models on questions of aviation, chemistry, medicine.

Kvasnikov worked very closely with Pavel Fitin, the head of NKVD's foreign intelligence unit, who believed strongly that the Soviet Union needed to develop nuclear weapons. Kvasnikov was sent to America where he assembled a group that included Klaus Fuchs, Theodore Hall, Harry Gold, Julius Rosenberg, David Greenglass and Ruth Greenglass.

On 8 May 1944 the NKVD station in New York City reported: "Fuchs advises that the work of the British in the United States is not meeting with success in view of the unwillingness of workers of the United States to share secrets with the British. It will be proposed to Fuchs that he should either return to England or work in the special laboratory-camp."

Kvasnikov suffered a set-back when one of his agents, Julius Rosenberg, was sacked from the Army Signal Corps Engineering Laboratories at Fort Monmouth, New Jersey, when they discovered that he had been a member of the Communist Party of the United States. NKVD headquarters in Moscow sent Kvasnikov a message on 23 February 1945: "The latest events with (Julius Rosenberg), his having been fired, are highly serious and demand on our part, first, a correct assessment of what happened, and second, a decision about (Rosenberg's) role in future. Deciding the latter, we should proceed from the fact that, in him, we have a man devoted to us, whom we can trust completely, a man who by his practical activities for several years has shown how strong is his desire to help our country. Besides, in (Rosenberg) we have a capable agent who knows how to work with people and has solid experience in recruiting new agents." Kvasnikov's main concern was that the FBI had discovered that Rosenberg was a spy. To protect the rest of the network, Rosenberg was told not to have any connection with other members of the network. However, the NKVD continued to pay him "maintenance" and was warned not to take any important decisions about his future work without Krasnikov's consent.

On his return to Moscow in 1945 Kvasnikov became deputy division head of scientific and technical intelligence, and in 1947 he headed the division until his resignation in 1963. He attained the rank of colonel and was awarded the Order of Lenin, twice the Order of the Red Banner of Labour, twice the Order of the Red Star, and other medals of the Soviet Union.
