= Arnold Kramish =

American physicist

- Born: June 6, 1923; Denver, Colorado, US
- Died: June 15, 2010 (aged 87); Washington, D.C., US
- Education: University of Denver; Harvard University
- Occupation: nuclear physicist

Arnold Kramish (June 6, 1923 – June 15, 2010) was an American nuclear physicist and author who was associated with the Manhattan Project. While working on the project, he was nearly killed in an accident at the Philadelphia Naval Yard where a prototype thermal diffusion isotope separation device was being constructed. The priest of the Philadelphia Naval Yard offered last rites to Kramish, who refused, as he was Jewish. After World War II, he wrote numerous books on nuclear issues. He is perhaps best known for his book The Griffin - the greatest untold espionage story of World War II, about Paul Rosbaud, who passed important scientific and military information from Germany to the Allies through Frank Foley who, as MI6 station chief in Berlin, had recruited Rosbaud as Der Greif, Agent Griffin.

== Education ==
Kramish was born on June 6, 1923, in Denver and received his undergraduate degree in 1945 from the University of Denver. He moved on to Harvard University, where he majored in physics and was awarded a master's degree in 1947.

== Manhattan Project ==
While still in college, Kramish was assigned to work on the Manhattan Project, working in the special engineering division at the Oak Ridge National Laboratory in Oak Ridge, Tennessee, Los Alamos National Laboratory in Los Alamos, New Mexico and at the Philadelphia Navy Yard. While working on a test in Philadelphia on September 2, 1944, Kramish was critically injured in the explosion of uranium enrichment equipment. Two engineers were killed immediately and two soldiers received severe burns in the accident, which occurred while they were trying to unclog an enrichment device which exploded, releasing steam laced with uranium hexafluoride and hydrofluoric acid. Kramish would later call the blast "perhaps then the largest release in history of radioactive materials".

Severely injured and losing consciousness, Kramish declined the assistance of a priest who was offering to administer Last Rites. While recuperating from the severe burns from the incident at a Philadelphia naval hospital, his mother came to visit him by train from Denver, carrying with her a jar of chicken soup on the three-day trip, which she fed him upon her arrival at the hospital, which Kramish would credit for his unexpected recovery. Despite wartime censorship of any details of the incident and secret classification after the war ended, Kramish lobbied the government to memorialize the victims of the accident.

== Post-war activities ==
After World War II, Kramish worked for the Atomic Energy Commission as a liaison to the Central Intelligence Agency providing intelligence estimates on Soviet nuclear capabilities and worked with Edward Teller on the design and development of the Hydrogen bomb. Physicist Samuel Cohen credited Kramish with being one of the first to obtain accurate information about Soviet efforts and making his best efforts to pass on that knowledge to senior officials. He assisted in the interrogation of David Greenglass, who was one of the atomic spies for the Soviet Union together with Julius and Ethel Rosenberg. He was later employed as a nuclear weapons research strategist by the RAND Corporation.

During the 1970s, Kramish was an adviser to the United States Department of State in Paris, and during the 1980s he served as the chair of a study for the Reagan administration that recommended pursuing the development of the Strategic Defense Initiative as a means to protect the United States from attack by strategic nuclear ballistic missiles. He was also an advisor to UNESCO and the Organisation for Economic Co-operation and Development on nuclear arms control and security issues.

Kramish became a historian of the atomic era, writing The Griffin - The greatest untold espionage story of World War II, about a spy who passed information to the British about the German nuclear energy project to develop an atom bomb for Nazi Germany, using information he gathered from some 500 interviews. In a review of the book, The Washington Post reviewer expressed his regret that "it is an ironic tribute to this bookish spy's mastery of his trade that the Griffin remains a surprisingly shadowy figure". Though he was frequently contacted as a source for history about the Manhattan Project and the history of the nuclear arms race, Robert Norris of the Natural Resources Defense Council regretted that he was not "more forthcoming and generous in sharing what he knew".

== Death ==
A resident of Reston, Virginia, Kramish died at age 87 on June 15, 2010, at George Washington University Hospital due to normal pressure hydrocephalus. He was survived by his wife, Vivian Raker, a daughter, a son, a sister, and four grandchildren.

== See also ==
- George Koval

== Bibliography ==
- Kramish, Arnold (1986). The Griffin: The Greatest Untold Espionage Story of World War II. Boston: Houghton Mifflin Company. ISBN 0-395-36318-7.
- "Before bomb fell, two Americans paid ultimate price", The Rocky Mountain News, Sunday: August 6, 1995, at childrenofthemanhattanproject.org about the Philadelphia Naval Yard accident.
- Atomic energy in the Soviet Union
- The peaceful atom in foreign policy
- Atomic energy for your business: Today's key to tomorrow's profits,
- Europe's enigmatic gap
- The emergent genie (The Rand Corporation.)
- Book review, Secrecy and the arms race: A theory of the accumulation of strategic weapons and how secrecy affects it (Rand paper series)
- The Soviet atomic power program: Large or small?
- A freeze on nuclear testing: Of problematical significance?
- Research policies in international perspective: A time for reappraisal (Rand)
- Research and development in the Common Market vis-a-vis the U.K., U.S., and U.S.S.R (Rand Corp. )
- The non-proliferation treaty at the crossroads (Institute for the Future. / IFF papers)
- Nuclear energy in the U.S.S.R
- The peaceful atom in retrospect and prospect
- The Soviet Union and the atom: Toward nuclear maturity (Rand Corporation)
- Atlantic technological imbalance: An American perspective
- The Soviet Union and the atom: The "secret" phase (Rand Corporation)
- The Chinese People's Republic and the bomb
- International registration of the atom (P-1134)
- The nuclear motive: In the beginning (Working papers / International Security Studies Program, Wilson Center)
- A reexamination of the nuclear proliferation problems presented by worldwide requirements for enriched fuel;: Relating the February 1965 options to today (Rand Corporation)
- Book review, The structure and performance of the aerospace industry (Rand paper series)
- Soviet atomic energy (Rand paper series)
