= Russell Alton McNutt =

American engineer (1914–2008)

Russell Alton McNutt (May 21, 1914 – February 1, 2008) was an American engineer who worked on the Manhattan Project. Posthumously-published analysis of KGB documents alleged that he was an atomic spy for the Soviet Union. An associate of convicted Soviet spy Julius Rosenberg, he is said to have passed information about the layout and design of parts of the Oak Ridge National Laboratory to the Soviets.

== Life ==
McNutt, one of six children, was born on May 21, 1914 in La Cygne, Kansas, to Ernest and Arnett "Addie" McNutt. Ernest was a longtime associate of Earl Browder, a future General Secretary of the Communist Party of the United States of America.

He attended Kansas State University before transferring to Brooklyn Polytechnic Institute, from which he graduated in 1940. Thereafter, McNutt took a succession of jobs, including one as assistant engineer for the New York City borough of Manhattan. It was around that time that McNutt met Julius Rosenberg at a resort farm owned by Ernest McNutt in Connecticut.

After the war, during which he also worked for the Manhattan Project, he went on to work for Gulf Oil until his retirement in 1979, holding various positions within the company and in Venezuela, Iran, and Spain. In 1974, he was vice-president of a Gulf Oil subsidiary that developed Reston, Virginia, a suburb of Washington, D.C., after its founder and original developer Robert E. Simon ran into financial trouble.

He died in Marion, North Carolina, on February 1, 2008.

== Alleged espionage ==
A book published in 2009 by John Earl Haynes, Harvey Klehr, and Alexander Vassiliev alleged that McNutt had been recruited by Rosenberg as a Soviet spy. This was based on Vassiliev's copious notes on documents in the KGB-successor SVR archives, although information from Venona decrypts matches McNutt's biography.

Vassiliev's notes indicate that in November 1943, at the suggestion of Rosenberg, McNutt took a job at the Kellex Corporation, which was responsible in part for the construction of and supply of equipment for the K-25 plant in Oak Ridge, Tennessee, which produced enriched uranium for atomic bombs. A few months later, in February 1944, Rosenberg passed McNutt's first contributions to the KGB. McNutt, who was the KGB's first source within the Manhattan Project, (Note: Klaus Fuchs, a fellow Project spy, had been recruited earlier not by the KGB but by the GRU.) was assigned first the code name FOGEL and then later PERSIAN or PERS. (Note: The code name PERS was later misattributed to the fictitious spy Perseus. PERS is PERSIAN in Russian.) He provided information about the structural design of K-25, including equipment locations and blueprints.

Despite his initial potential, per the notes, the KGB found McNutt wanting and so attempted but failed to persuade him to, despite financial incentives, uproot from New York to Oak Ridge. He proved unwilling to live alone in Tennessee and to abandon both a local business venture and his sick wife.

The FBI undertook an investigation of him from 1950 to 1951 after Rosenberg's and David Greenglass's arrests; Greenglass had fingered him as a collaborator of Rosenberg's. He was never charged or convicted, the investigation having turned up no conclusive indications of his espionage.

== See also ==
- Perseus (spy)
- Venona project
