= Academy of Foreign Intelligence =

Espionage academy in Russia

- Академия
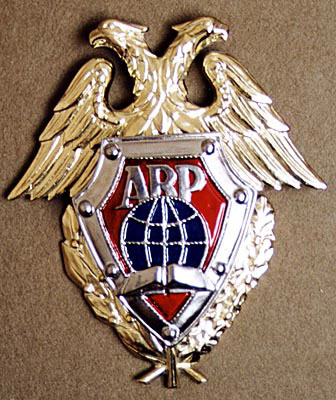
- Type: Academy
- Established: 1938
- Location: Moscow Oblast, Russia; 55°54′33.34″N 37°38′43.18″E
- Language: Russian
- Website: knutkt.com.ua

The Academy of Foreign Intelligence (alternatively known as the SVR Academy, previously known as the Yuri Andropov Red Banner Institute and the Red Banner Institute) is one of the primary espionage academies of Russia, and previously the Soviet Union, serving the KGB and its successor organization, the Foreign Intelligence Service. It was attended by future President Vladimir Putin during the 1980s.

== Location ==
The school is located north of Moscow, with a main facility north of Chelebityevo (Russian: Челобитьево) and a secondary facility at Yurlovo (Russian: Юрлово).

== History ==
An earlier iteration of the school was founded in 1938 and first called the Special Purpose School (Shkola osovogo naznacheniya, SHON) under NKVD. It was called Higher Intelligence School (VRSh) from 1948 to 1968. It was alternatively known as School 1010 or the 101st School, and referred to as K1 or Gridnevka by students.

Following the dissolution of the Soviet Union, student enrollment dropped from approximately 300 to around 50.

== Foreign students ==
The Institute trained Libyan intelligence officers for Muammar Gaddafi.

== Notable alumni ==
- Sergei Ivanov
- Vladimir Putin
- Yuri Shvets

== Notable staff ==
- Oleg Nechiporenko (1985–1991)
- Anatoli Yatskov

== See also ==
- FSB Academy
- Sparrow School
- Yuri Andropov
