= Oscar Seborer =

Soviet atomic spy on Manhattan Project

- Born: June 4, 1921; New York City
- Died: April 23, 2015 (aged 93); Moscow
- Education: Ohio State University; University of Michigan
- Espionage activity
- Allegiance: USSR
- Service years: 1941–1951
- Codename: Godsend

Oscar Seborer (June 4, 1921 – April 23, 2015), codenamed Godsend, was an atomic spy for the Soviet Union who worked at the Clinton Engineer Works in Oak Ridge, Tennessee and the Los Alamos Laboratory, New Mexico.

== Early life ==
Oscar Seborer was born in New York City on June 4, 1921, youngest child of Jewish Polish immigrants Abraham Seborer, a clerk, and Jennie (Scheine) née Chanover. He had four older siblings: three brothers, Max, Noah and Stuart, and a sister, Rose. Abraham and Jennie lived in what was then called Palestine from 1934 to 1938, and Oscar apparently lived there with them.

All five children had some contact with the Communist Party USA (CPUSA). Max's first wife Rita Beigel was the sister of Rose Beigel Arenal, the second wife of Leopoldo Arenal, the brother of artist Luis Arenal Bastar. Leopoldo and Luis were involved in a plot to kill Leon Trotsky. Rose Beigel Arenal forwarded mail from Leopoldo to Elizabeth Bentley. After Rose's death, Max married Celia Posen, who had served as a nurse with the Abraham Lincoln Battalion during the Spanish Civil War, and was friends with Harry Magdoff, Irving Kaplan and Stanley Graze. Max never joined the CPUSA, but his brother Noah did. Noah was close to Frederick Vanderbilt Field, Maurice Halperin and Albert Maltz, a screenwriter who later became one of the blacklisted Hollywood Ten. Oscar's sister Rose worked for the CPUSA in New York in administrative positions.

Neither Oscar nor Stuart joined the CPUSA. Stuart attended City College of New York (CCNY) with Julius Rosenberg and William Perl. In 1941, Stuart joined the Treasury Department, where he worked under William Ullman, Frank Coe and Harry Dexter White. During World War II, Stuart served in the Army in Europe, earning the Silver Star. His wife Miriam née Zeitlin served with the WAVES in the Bureau of Ships. During a routine Hatch Act of 1939 investigation in 1942, she denied having any involvement with the CPUSA. Oscar also attended CCNY but then enrolled at Ohio State University, where he studied electrical engineering.

== Manhattan Project ==
Oscar was drafted into the Army in 1942, but due to his special training he was assigned to the Special Engineer Detachment (SED), a program that identified enlisted personnel with special technical or scientific skills, and put them to work on the Manhattan Project, the effort to build an atomic bomb. He was assigned to the Clinton Engineer Works in Oak Ridge, Tennessee, and then to the Los Alamos Laboratory in New Mexico. He was present at the Trinity nuclear test on July 16, 1945, with a group measuring the seismological effect of the explosion.

== Post-war ==
Stuart was discharged from the Army in 1946, but continued to work for it in a civilian capacity with the Civil Affairs Division in Europe. He wrote a report on economic progress in Bizone, Germany in 1949, and one on the Army's education program the following year. Stuart's wife Miriam graduated from George Washington University Medical School that year, but when he applied for a job at the State Department, he was told that he would not be granted the necessary security clearance.

Oscar applied for a civilian position at Los Alamos in 1947, but withdrew his application. Instead, he went to the University of Michigan, where he completed his master's degree in electrical engineering. After he graduated in August 1948, he took a job at the US Navy's Underwater Sound Laboratory in New London, Connecticut, where research on sonar for submarines was conducted. In August 1949, the commanding officer recommended his termination as a security risk, but on August 29 a review board overturned this decision. He was transferred to the Electronic Shore Division of the Bureau of Ships, where he was involved in the installation of electronic equipment in American and European harbors. The equipment itself was not secret, but the location of devices was. He was the only man working in the unit who did not hold a security clearance. On June 1, 1951 he tendered his resignation.

== Emigration ==
On July 3, 1951, Stuart, Oscar, Miriam and Miriam's mother Anna boarded the liner SS Liberté bound for Le Havre. They then flew to Israel, where they visited Abraham and Jennie, who had re-emigrated in August 1950 and were living in Gan Yavne. They went to Vienna, and then to Moscow. Stuart and Oscar were employed there by the Soviet Academy of Sciences. Miriam and Stuart divorced in September 1961, and she returned to the United States in December 1969. She later worked as a medical technician at the United Nations until 1974. She died in 2002. Stuart and Oscar married Russian women. They became friends with Donald MacLean, a British spy for the Soviet Union who had worked with them. Stuart wrote a couple of books including US Neocolonialism in Africa (1974), which was translated into English, and Weaponry and Dollars: The Wellsprings of U.S. Foreign Policy (1987), which was published only in Russian.

== Discovery ==
American codebreakers working on Venona found that the Manhattan Project had been penetrated by Soviet spies, which gave it the codename "Enormous". They found references to codenames for three Soviet atomic spies working at Los Alamos: "M'Lad", who turned out to be Theodore Hall; "Caliber", who was David Greenglass; and "Godsend", who was ultimately identified as Oscar Seborer. Since Klaus Fuchs was also known to be a Soviet spy, there were at least four Soviet agents at Los Alamos.

== Death ==
Oscar Seborer died in Moscow on April 23, 2015. Mourners included his brother Stuart and a representative from the Russian Federal Security Service.
