= Menachem Zeev Greenglass =

Menachem Zeev ("Wolf") Greenglass (1917 – 29 December 2010) was a Polish-Canadian rabbi associated with the Chabad-Lubavitch Hasidic movement.

== Biography ==
=== Early life ===
Menachem Zeev was born in Łódź, Poland, in 1917; his parents were Avraham Yechiel and Yuta Chava Greenglass, followers of the Alexander chassidic dynasty. When he was twenty years old, Greenglass travelled to Otwock, Poland, and enrolled in the Lubavitch yeshivah there. Greenglass was later appointed as a mentor for a selected group of students at the school.

=== World War II ===
During World War II, Greenglass and his peers received transit visas from the Japanese consul, Chiune Sugihara. They travelled by rail through Russia, stopping at the eastern port city of Vladivostok. From there they travelled by boat to Japan, and on to Shanghai, China. Nine of the Chabad students, including Greenglass, eventually received visas to Canada.

=== Canada ===
Rabbi Greenglass helped establish the Chabad yeshivah in Montreal, where he served as a mashpia for many years.

=== Death ===
Greenglass died on Wednesday, 22 Teves, 5771 (December 29, 2010), at the age of 94, survived by his sons Avremi Greenglass, Yossi Greenglass and daughter Surie Cohen; grandchildren and great grandchildren.

== Works ==
Greenglass coauthored a book titled Sefer Haminhagim on Chabad customs with Rabbi Leibel Groner, who served as the Rebbe's secretary. The book has become the standard collection of Chabad Chasidic customs and practices. His other work was titled Lekutei Dinim, a guide to daily life written Yiddish, was edited by the Lubavitcher Rebbe, Rabbi Menachem Mendel Schneerson.

== See also ==
- Chabad
  - Mashpia
