= Total Espionage doctrine =

Total Espionage doctrine is a specific approach to intelligence gathering, implicating as many variable sources as possible. It combines political, economic, financial, military and industrial espionage. Like other types of espionage, it is subdivided into active and passive espionage. In its original meaning, it applies to human intelligence (HUMINT). It characterizes authoritarian and totalitarian regimes. In the 20th century total espionage was practiced by Japan, Germany and the Soviet Russia. During the Cold War, the Soviet propaganda often accused the United States of total espionage.

== Kurt Reiss ==
Total espionage doctrine was first defined by Kurt Riess in his 1941 book Total Espionage: Germany's Information and Disinformation Apparatus 1932-40. German intelligence used Germans residing or travelling abroad, as well as foreign sympathizers, to collect all sorts of information – political, scientific, economic, etc. Tourists, scientists, actors, university professors, sailors, auto-mechanics, diplomats, journalists, NGO's and business corporations were instrumentalized to gather intelligence and to sabotage the enemy. One important instrument of intelligence gathering was The Organization of Germans Living Abroad, directed by Ernst Wilhelm Bohle, a special assistant to the German Counter-Intelligence (SD) Chief Walter Schellenberg. Vast network of spies was developed by Goebbels' Counter-Action (Abwehr) Department jointly with the War Ministry Intelligence Service. This department was also in charge of controlling German-language newspapers in non-German-speaking countries. According to Riess, "by 1937 Goebbels controlled some 330 German newspapers in non-German-speaking countries. This figure did not include the large number of newspapers in Switzerland, Alsace, and Czechoslovakia, nor the newspapers in other languages". The goal of this control was not only propaganda, but espionage.

Even though Hitler's total espionage was a prerequisite of total war, Germany's failure to defeat the Soviet Union quickly was, according to Riess, a result of its inability to build a sound espionage network there.

== Roger Deacon ==
Intelligence historian Roger Deacon attributed the invention of total espionage strategy to the pre-Revolutionary Russian secret police, known as the "Okhrana". "Okhrana" was created in 1881 following the assassination of Alexander II. According to Deacon, this police agency was "the most comprehensive coordinated espionage and counter-espionage organization, the most total form of espionage devised in the latter part of the XIX century and still forming the basis of Soviet espionage and counter-espionage today."

== Oleg Nechiporenko ==
In the early 2000s total espionage doctrine resurfaced, due to the efforts of Oleg Nechiporenko, a KGB counter-intelligence operative turned espionage theorist. In his 2001 article "Playing on Enemy's Field", discussing ancient Chinese spying strategy, Nechiporenko declared: "The object of espionage can be anything: there is no person, nor any area or a single phenomenon in the enemy's country that might remain unknown to the opposite side. And the main instrument of this knowledge is spying." The article was edited by the Federal Security Service's Center for Public Relations.

== Valery Gerasimov ==
Later total espionage doctrine was incorporated in the so-called "hybrid warfare doctrine" or "the Gerasimov doctrine", named after the Russian Chief of Staff General Valery Gerasimov. In Gerasimov's view, non-military methods could be as efficient if not superior to direct military action. Hybrid warfare doctrine also relied on guerilla war tactics as well as on the concept of asymmetric warfare. Hybrid warfare was used by the Russians during the Crimea annexation and in its war in Donbas. Some of its elements, like faking Western media outlets, are used in the Russian covert campaign against the United States and its allies.
