= Anatoli Yatskov =

Soviet diplomat (1913–1993)

Anatoly Yatskov
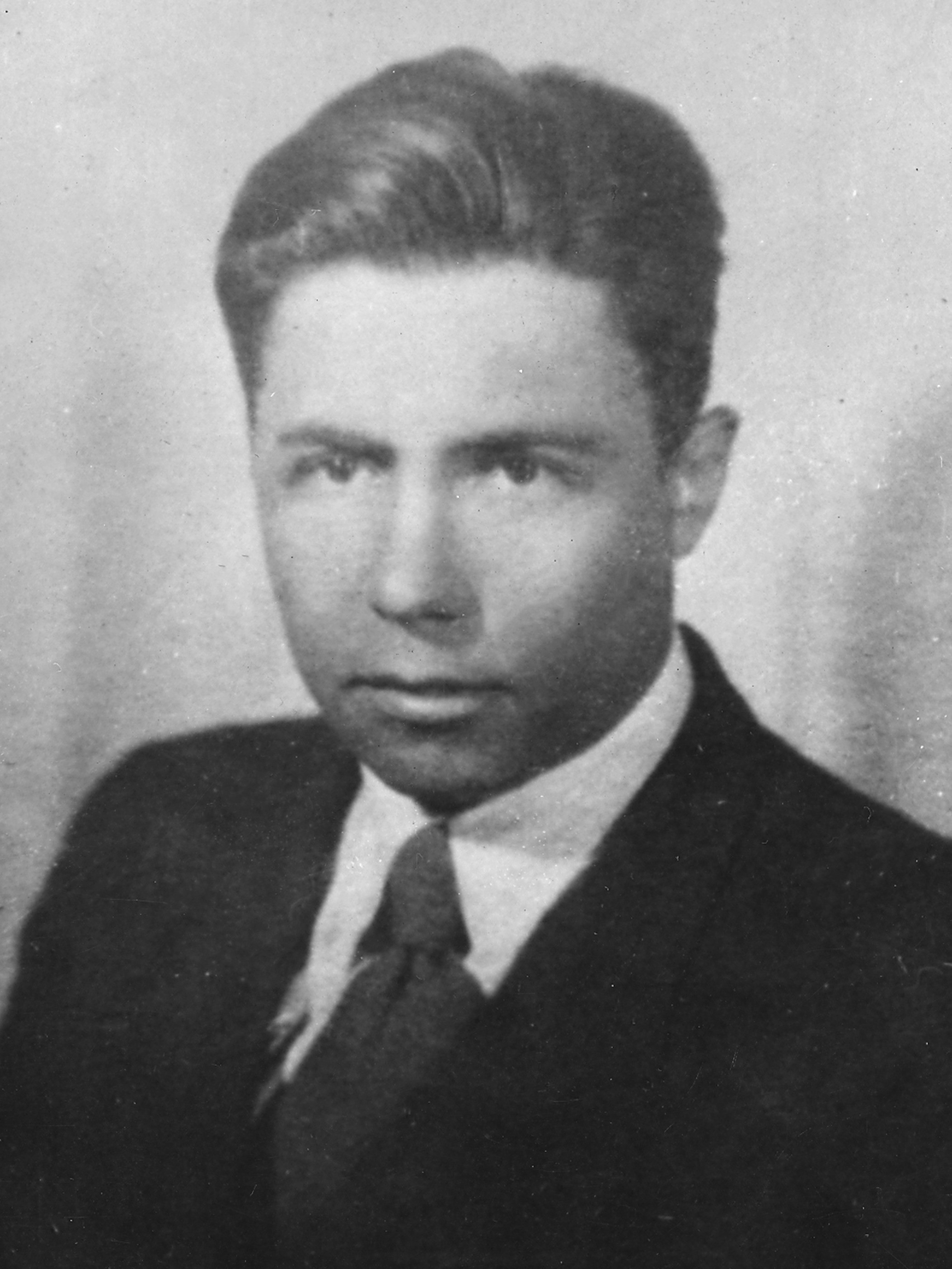
- Yatskov in 1951
- Born: Anatoly Antonovich Yatskov; Анатолий Антонович Яцков; 18 May 1913; Akkerman, Russian Empire
- Died: 26 March 1993 (aged 79); Moscow, Russia
- Espionage activity
- Allegiance: Soviet Union
- Service branch: NKVD
- Service years: 1940–1993
- Codename: John, Alexei, Anatoly Yakovlev

Anatoly Antonovich Yatskov (Russian: Анатолий Антонович Яцков; 31 May [O.S. 18 May] 1913 – 26 March 1993), also known as Anatoli Yatzkov (alias in the U.S. Anatoly Yakovlev) – was a Soviet consul in New York as well as an NKVD foreign intelligence officer handling American agents and couriers linked to the U.S. Manhattan Project during WWII. His spy cover was eventually blown by the U.S. Army Venona Program which identified him as a key NKVD spymaster involved in the 1940s Atomic Spy Ring.

== Career ==
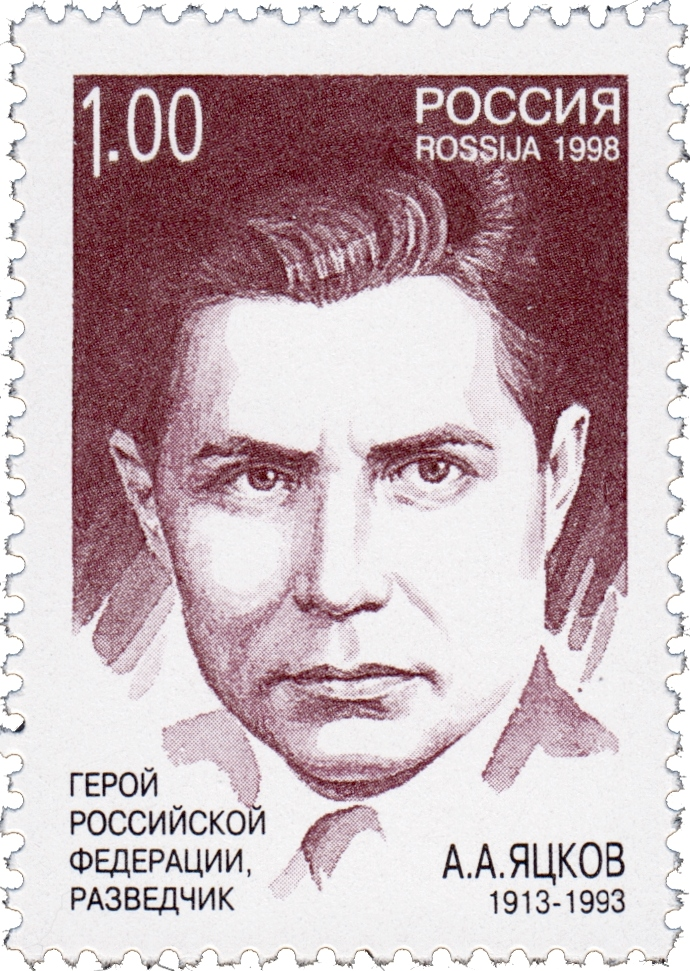
Yatskov on a 1998 Russian stamp

In 1940 Yatskov had graduated the NKVD intelligence school (NKVD Special Academy, SHON) majoring in English and was assigned to NKVD Department 5 (foreign operations) Section 5 (U.S. operations). In 1941 he was given his first overseas assignment in New York as a case officer at the NKVD station (Rezidentura) at the Soviet Consulate general under the alias name of Anatoly Yakovlev. His NKVD operational alias at the time was JONNY. He was employed as a consular apprentice until 1943, being eventually promoted to Soviet vice-consul (ranking 3rd Secretary).

In New York station Yatskov was eventually assigned to most sensitive NKVD operations concerning the allied Manhattan Project (known in NKVD as OPERATION ENORMOUS). NKVD New York station was crucial for the Soviet Union in obtaining most sensitive data on the U.S. Army Los Alamos nuclear facility and precise knowledge on development of the A-Bomb. Among other activities Yatskov recruited Harry Gold at the Pennsylvania Sugar Company, his NKVD colleague Alexander Feklisov further employing Gold to liaise with Soviet agents in the U.S. Manhattan Project. Besides Gold, main NKVD couriers between New York and Los Alamos National Laboratory included the Cohen couple (known to NKVD as VOLUNTEERS). Being close with the Cohens, Yatskov was able to covertly communicate with chief atomic scientist Klaus Fuchs directly involved in the Manhattan Project.

Yatskov was rotated back from New York back to Russia in 1946. Having left U.S. soil four years prior to the Rosenbergs' trial he was summoned in the indictment as one of Julius Rosenberg's NKVD case officers but legal action was waived due to his diplomatic immunity. Returning to the Soviet Union, Yatskov was awarded the rank of NKVD colonel and held senior positions in the NKVD foreign scientific department. He was engaged in case handlings in Europe and Asia, in the 1950s being posted to Paris and Berlin as well as covertly living for some time in Iraq as a Canadian national.

In the 1960s Yatskov was named the senior case officer in the KGB foreign scientific department (named Department T) responsible for assessing and recruiting foreign scientists on Soviet soil. In the 1970s Yatskov had left active posts and was named the scientific head of KGB Intelligence Academy (Red Banner Academy, known as KI). He retired from the KGB as a colonel in 1985, living in Moscow in his retirement and buried at Moscow Vagankov cemetery.

== Honours ==
Yatskov was awarded Soviet medals for Orders of October Revolution, Red Banner, and the Red Star, as well as the honorary KGB medal for "Distinguished Security Services". In 1996 his lifetime achievements for the Russian state were posthumously awarded the highest honour of Hero of the Russian Federation. In his 1992 interview Yatskov mentioned that in the 1950s the FBI had uncovered "less than the half of NKVD U.S. network" publicly referring to an uncovered atomic source at that time still alive in the U.S. as PERSEUS.

== See also ==
- List of Heroes of the Russian Federation
