= Atomic spies =

WWII Soviet nuclear-research spies in the West

Atomic spies or atom spies were people in the United States, the United Kingdom, or Canada, who are known to have illicitly given information about nuclear weapons production or design, to the Soviet Union, during World War II and the early Cold War. Exactly what was given, and whether everyone so accused actually gave it, are still matters of some scholarly dispute. In some cases, some of the arrested suspects or government witnesses had given strong testimonies or confessions, which they recanted later or said were fabricated. Their work constitutes the most publicly well-known and well-documented case of nuclear espionage in the history of nuclear weapons. At the same time, numerous nuclear scientists favored sharing classified information with the world scientific community. This proposal was firmly quashed by the U.S. government.

Atomic spies were motivated by a range of factors. For some, ideology (such as a commitment to communism or other socialist models committed to advancing the interests of the Soviet Union) was the primary reason for their spying. Others were motivated by financial gain, while some may have been coerced or blackmailed into spying. The prospect of playing a role in shaping the outcome of the Cold War may also have been appealing to some. Another large motivational factor was being engrained into the history of the world, and/or being remembered as someone who did something "larger than themselves". Regardless of their specific motivations, each individual played a significant role in the way the Cold War unfolded, and the continuing state of nuclear weapons.

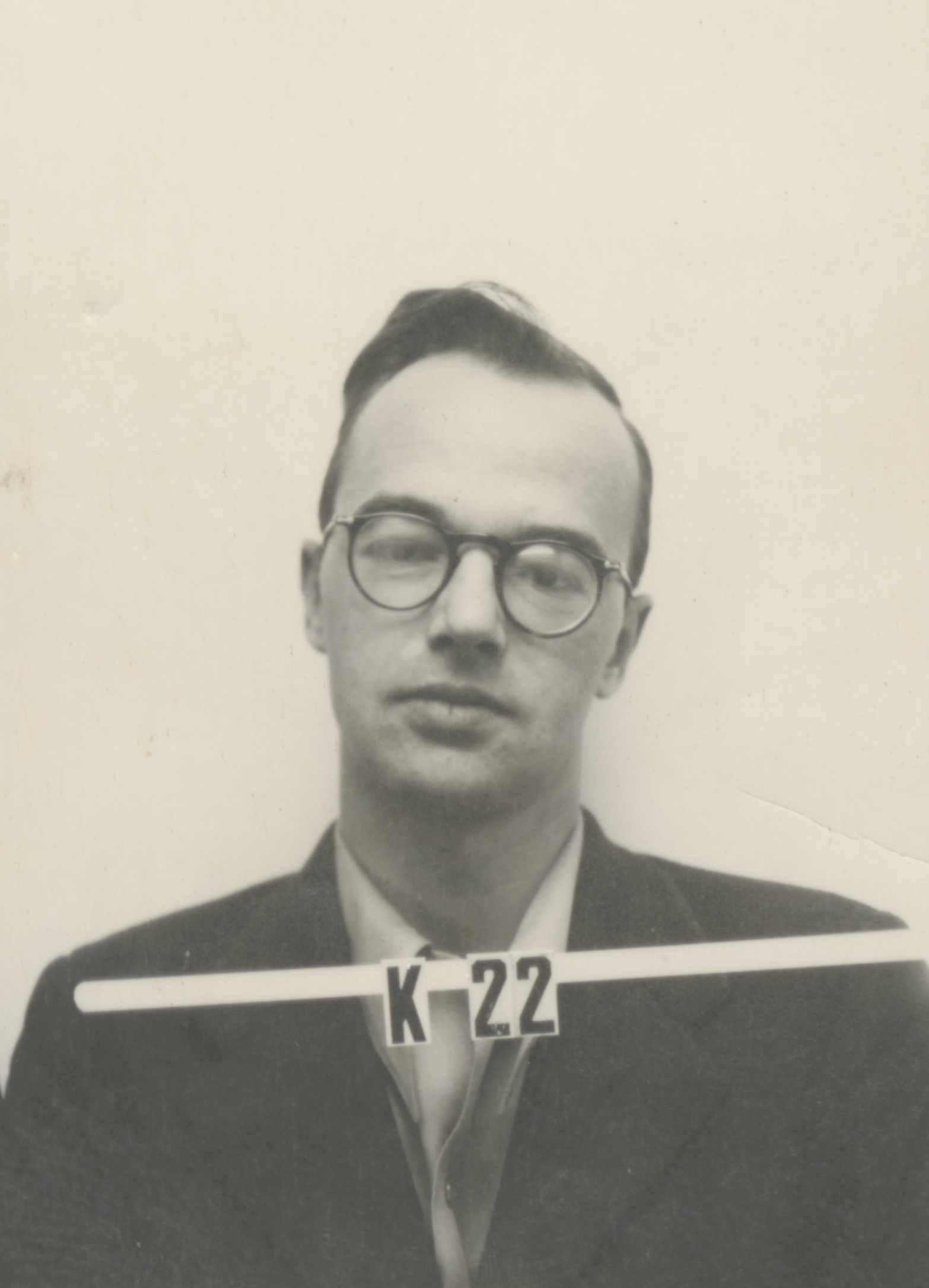
Klaus Fuchs, arguably the most important of the identified "atomic spies" for his extensive access to high-level scientific data and his ability to make sense of it through his technical training

Confirmation about espionage work came from the Venona project, which intercepted and decrypted Soviet intelligence reports sent during (and after) World War II. In 1995, the U.S. declassified its Venona Files which consisted of deciphered 1949 Soviet intelligence communications. These provided clues to the identity of several spies at Los Alamos and elsewhere, some of whom have never been identified. These decryptions prompted the arrest of naturalized British citizen Klaus Fuchs in 1950. Fuchs's confession led to the discovery of spy Harry Gold who served as his Soviet courier. Gold identified spy David Greenglass, a Los Alamos Army-machinist. Greenglass identified his brother-in-law, spy Julius Rosenberg, as his control. The Venona Files corroborated their espionage activities and also revealed others in the network of Soviet spies, including physicist Theodore Hall who also worked at Los Alamos. Some of this information was available to the government during the 1950s trials, but it was not usable in court as it was highly classified. Historians have found that records from Soviet archives, which were briefly opened to researchers after the fall of the Soviet Union, included more information about some spies.

Transcription of declassified Soviet KGB documents by ex-KGB officer Alexander Vassiliev provides additional details about Soviet espionage from 1930 to 1950, including the greater extent of Fuchs, Hall, and Greenglass's contributions. In 2007, spy George Koval, who worked at Oak Ridge and Los Alamos, was revealed. According to Vassiliev's notebooks, Fuchs provided the Soviet Union the first information on electromagnetic separation of uranium and the primary explosion needed to start the chain reaction, as well as a complete and detailed technical report with the specifications for both fission bombs. Hall provided a report on Los Alamos principle bomb designs and manufacturing, the plutonium implosion model, and identified other scientists working on the bomb. Greenglass supplied information on the preparation of the uranium bomb, calculations pertaining to structural issues with it, and material on producing uranium-235. Fuchs's information corroborated Hall and Greenglass. Koval had access to critical information on dealing with the reactor-produced plutonium's fizzle problem, and how using manufactured polonium corrected the problem. With all the stolen information, Soviet nuclear ability was advanced by several years at least.

== Importance ==
Before World War II, the theoretical possibility of nuclear fission resulted in intense discussion among leading physicists world-wide. Scientists from the Soviet Union were later recognized for their contributions to the understanding of a nuclear reality and won several Nobel Prizes. Soviet scientists such as Igor Kurchatov, L. D. Landau, and Kirill Sinelnikov helped establish the idea of, and prove the existence of, a splittable atom. Dwarfed by the Manhattan Project conducted by the US during the war, the significance of the Soviet contributions has been rarely understood or credited outside the field of physics. According to several sources, it was understood on a theoretical level that the atom provided for extremely powerful and novel releases of energy and could possibly be used in the future for military purposes.

In recorded comments, physicists lamented their inability to achieve any kind of practical application from the discoveries. They thought that creation of an atomic weapon was unattainable. According to a United States Congressional joint committee, although the scientists could conceivably have been first to generate a man-made fission reaction, they lacked the ambition, funding, engineering capability, leadership, and ultimately, the capability to do so. The undertaking would be of an unimaginable scale, and the resources required to engineer for such use as a nuclear bomb, and nuclear power were deemed too great to pursue.

At the urging of Albert Einstein and Leo Szilard in their letter of August 2, 1939, the United States – in collaboration with Britain and Canada – recognized the potential significance of an atomic bomb. They embarked in 1942 upon work to achieve a usable device. Estimates suggest that during the quest to create the atomic bomb, an investment of $2 billion, temporary use of 13,000 tons of silver, and 24,000 skilled workers drove the research and development phase of the project. Those skilled workers included the people to maintain and operate the machinery necessary for research.

The largest Western facility had five hundred scientists working on the project, and a team of fifty to derive the equations for the cascade of neutrons required to drive the reaction. The fledgling equivalent Soviet program was quite different: The program consisted of fifty scientists, and two mathematicians trying to work out the equations for the particle cascade. The research and development of techniques to produce sufficiently enriched uranium and plutonium were beyond the scope and efforts of the Soviet group. The knowledge of techniques and strategies that the Allied programs employed, and which Soviet espionage obtained, may have played a role in the rapid development of the Soviet bomb after the war.

The research and development of methods suitable for doping and separating the highly reactive isotopes needed to create the payload for a nuclear warhead took years and consumed a vast quantity of resources. The United States and Great Britain dedicated their best scientists to this cause and constructed three plants, each with a different isotope-extraction method. The Allied program decided to use gas-phase extraction to obtain the pure uranium necessary for an atomic detonation. Using this method took large quantities of uranium ore and other rare materials, such as graphite, to successfully purify the U-235 isotope. The quantities required for the development were beyond the scope and purview of the Soviet program.

The Soviet Union did not have natural uranium-ore mines at the start of the nuclear arms race but in early 1943 it began to acquire uranium metal, uranium oxide, and uranium nitrate through the Lend-Lease Agreement with the U.S. By February 1943, Laboratory No. 2 was established by decree of the Soviet Academy of Sciences, with Igor V. Kurchatov as its head. Kurchatov recruited Khariton to work with him. A lack of materials made it very difficult for them to conduct novel research or to map out a clear pathway to achieving the fuel they needed. The Soviet scientists became frustrated with the difficulties of producing uranium fuel cheaply, and they found their industrial techniques for refinement lacking. The use of information stolen from the Manhattan Project eventually rectified the problem. Without such information, the problems of the Soviet atomic team would have taken many years to correct, affecting the production of a Soviet atomic weapon significantly.

Some historians believe that the Soviet Union achieved its great leaps in its atomic program by the espionage information and technical data that Moscow succeeded in obtaining from the Manhattan Project. Once the Soviets had learned of the American plans to develop an atomic bomb during the 1940s, Moscow began recruiting agents to get information. Moscow sought very specific information from its intelligence cells in America and demanded updates on the progress of the Allied project. Moscow was also greatly concerned with the procedures being used for U-235 separation, what method of detonation was being used, and what industrial equipment was being used for these techniques.

The Soviet Union needed spies who had security clearance high enough to have access to classified information at the Manhattan Project and who could understand and interpret what they were stealing. Moscow also needed reliable spies who believed in the communist cause and would provide accurate information. Theodore Hall was a spy who had worked on the development of the plutonium bomb the US dropped in Japan. Hall provided the specifications of the bomb dropped on Nagasaki. This information allowed the Soviet scientists a first-hand look at the setup of a successful atomic weapon built by the Manhattan Project.

The most influential of the atomic spies was Klaus Fuchs. Fuchs, a German-born British physicist, went to the United States to work on the atomic project and became one of its lead scientists. Fuchs had become a member of the Communist Party in 1932 while still a student in Germany. With the rise of the Nazi regime in 1933, Fuchs, a staunch anti-fascist, fled Germany and sought refuge in Britain. There, he continued his academic pursuits and eventually earned a Ph.D. in physics from the University of Bristol in 1937. Fuchs quickly established himself as a leading expert in theoretical physics. He eventually became one of the lead nuclear physicists in the British program. In 1943 he moved to the United States to collaborate on the Manhattan Project.

Due to Fuchs's position in the atomic program, he had access to most, if not all, of the material Moscow desired. Fuchs was also able to interpret and understand the information he was stealing, which made him an invaluable resource. Fuchs provided the Soviets with detailed information on the gas-phase separation process. Harry Gold, a courier for the Soviet Union, was the man who actually transported the information to Soviet agents. He also provided specifications for the payload, calculations and relationships for setting of the fission reaction, and schematics for labs producing weapons-grade isotopes.

He reported on the existence of America's plutonium bomb plans including its plutonium production plant at Oak Ridge, Tennessee. Fuchs revealed that a plutonium bomb needed an implosion method of detonation rather than the gun method utilized in a uranium bomb. Ultimately, he provided the design of the plutonium bomb that was used for the Trinity test, a description of its initiator, that it had a solid not hollow plutonium core, and other details about its design specification, the size of the explosion it would generate, and when and where it would be tested.

This information helped the smaller under-manned and under-supplied Soviet group move toward the successful detonation of a nuclear weapon. Fuchs also had a significant role in advancing Soviet production of the fusion hydrogen bomb. He had attended Los Alamos meetings in 1946 on "Super" and worked on its dual implosion/ignition reaction, information about which he shared with Moscow through 1948. His contributions are reflected in the fact that within a year of the first U.S. hydrogen bomb test in 1952, the USSR successfully tested its hydrogen bomb in 1953.

Another person who played a significant role in the Soviet Union's acquisition of atomic secrets was Harry Gold. He acted as a Soviet spy during the 1940s and early 1950s, aiding the exchange of American nuclear program information to the Soviets. Gold's primary contact within Soviet intelligence was Anatoli Yatskov. Yatskov was stationed at the Soviet consulate in New York City and tasked with recruiting American citizens to spy on behalf of the Soviet Union. He recruited a number of people to work for the Soviet Union, including Julius and Ethel Rosenberg, David Greenglass, and Klaus Fuchs.

Gold's role in this network was to act as a courier, passing along information and money between the Soviet agents in the United States and their handlers in Moscow. He also helped to recruit new spies and served as a translator for some of the intelligence materials that were passed along. Without atomic spies such as Harry Gold, Julius and Ethel Rosenberg, David Greenglass, and Klaus Fuchs the rate at which the Soviet Union achieved nuclear weaponry would have been impossible. Gold's work as a spy came to an end in 1950 when he was arrested by the FBI. He was eventually convicted of espionage and sentenced to 30 years in prison. He was released after serving only 15 years as part of a prisoner exchange program with the Soviet Union.

The Soviet nuclear program would have eventually been able to develop a nuclear weapon without the aid of espionage. It did not develop a basic understanding of the usefulness of an atomic weapon, the sheer resources required, and the talent until much later. Espionage helped the Soviet scientists identify which methods worked and prevented their wasting valuable resources on techniques which the development of the American bomb had proven ineffective. The speed at which the Soviet nuclear program achieved a working bomb, with so few resources, depended on the information acquired through espionage. During the Cold War trials, the United States emphasized the significance of that espionage.

The activities of atomic spies underscored the intense competition between the United States and the Soviet Union for nuclear supremacy during the Cold War. Their actions had profound implications for international security and contributed to the escalation of tensions between the two superpowers. The revelations of atomic espionage also led to increased efforts to enhance counterintelligence measures and prevents further breaches of national security.

== Notable suspected spies ==
- Haakon Chevalier and George C. Eltenton were involved in the Chevalier incident in 1943 when Robert Oppenheimer was approached for information to send to the Soviet Union on the Manhattan Project. The delayed revelation of this proposal was one of the reasons for Oppenheimer losing his security clearance in 1954.

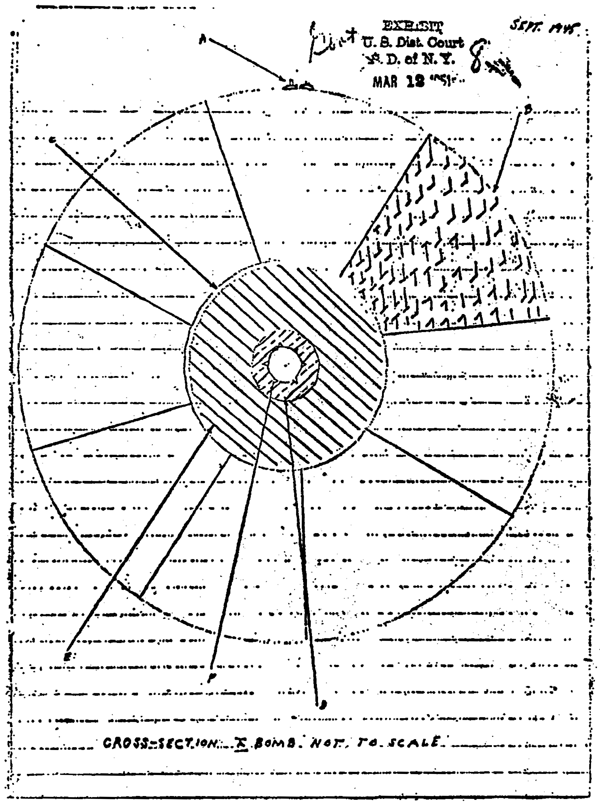
Sketch of an implosion-type nuclear weapon design made by David Greenglass as state's evidence, illustrating what he gave the Rosenbergs to pass on to the Soviet Union

- Morris Cohen – an American, "Thanks to Cohen, designers of the Soviet atomic bomb got piles of technical documentation straight from the secret laboratory in Los Alamos," the newspaper Komsomolskaya Pravda said. Morris and his wife, Lona, served eight years in prison, less than half of their sentences, before being released in a prisoner swap with the Soviet Union. He died without revealing the name of the American scientist who helped pass vital information about the United States atomic bomb project.
- Klaus Fuchs – the German-born British theoretical physicist who worked with the British delegation at Los Alamos during the Manhattan Project. Fuchs was arrested in the UK and tried there. Lord Goddard sentenced him to fourteen years' imprisonment, the maximum for violating the Official Secrets Act. Fuchs escaped the charge of espionage due to a lack of independent evidence and because, at the time of his activities, the Soviet Union was an ally, not an enemy, of Great Britain. In December 1950 he was stripped of his British citizenship. He was released on June 23, 1959, after serving nine years and four months of his sentence at Wakefield prison. Fuchs was allowed to emigrate to Dresden, then in communist East Germany. In his 2019 book, Trinity: The Treachery and Pursuit of the Most Dangerous Spy in History, Frank Close asserts that "it was primarily Fuchs who enabled the Soviets to catch up with Americans" in the race for the nuclear bomb.
- Harry Gold – an American, Gold's most infamous act was his involvement in passing information from Klaus Fuchs, a German-born physicist working on the Manhattan Project, to the Soviets. He facilitated the transfer of highly classified information, including details about the atomic bomb, to Soviet intelligence agents. In 1950, Gold was arrested by the FBI and confessed to his espionage activities. He cooperated with authorities, providing valuable information about Soviet espionage networks in the United States. In 1951, Gold was sentenced to thirty years in prison, but he was released in 1966 after serving just over fifteen years. He lived out the remainder of his life quietly, working as a technician and later as a chemist in a hospital.
- David Greenglass – an American machinist at Los Alamos during the Manhattan Project. Greenglass confessed that he gave crude schematics of lab experiments to the Russians during World War II. He recanted some aspects of his testimony against his sister Ethel and brother-in-law Julius Rosenberg, which he said he gave in an effort to protect his own wife, Ruth, from prosecution. Greenglass was sentenced to 15 years in prison, served 10 years, and later reunited with his wife.
- Theodore Hall – an American, was the youngest physicist at Los Alamos. He gave a detailed description of the Fat Man plutonium bomb, and of several processes for purifying plutonium, to Soviet intelligence. His motivation stemmed from his socialist views and his wish to keep the US from possessing all atomic weapons. Hall's espionage efforts were noteworthy because they gave the Soviets important information about how the Manhattan Project was coming along. Afterward he moved to England, Hall followed a profession in physics after the war and rose to prominence as a researcher. He held positions at a number of universities, including Cambridge and the University of Chicago. Hall died in Cambridge, England, on November 1, 1999; his identity as a spy was not revealed until very late in the 20th century. Hall's espionage activities remained unknown to U.S. authorities until the 1990s when declassified Soviet intelligence documents and statements from former KGB agents revealed his role. He was never tried for his espionage work, though he admitted to it in later years to reporters and to his family.
- George Koval – the American-born son of a Belarusian emigrant family who returned to the Soviet Union. He was inducted into the Red Army and recruited into the Main Intelligence Directorate (GRU). He infiltrated the United States Army and became a radiation health officer in the Special Engineer Detachment. Acting under the code name Delmar he obtained information from Oak Ridge National Laboratory and the Dayton Project about the Urchin detonator used on the Fat Man plutonium bomb. His work was not known to the West until 2007, when he was posthumously recognized as a "Hero of the Russian Federation" by Vladimir Putin.
- Irving Lerner – an American film director, he was caught photographing the cyclotron at the University of California, Berkeley in 1944. After the war, he was blacklisted.
- Alan Nunn May – a British citizen, he was one of the first Soviet spies to be discovered. He worked on the Manhattan Project and was betrayed by a Soviet defector in Canada in 1946. He was convicted that year, which led the United States to restrict the sharing of atomic secrets with the UK. On May 1, 1946, he was convicted and sentenced to ten years hard labour. He was released in 1952, after serving 6½ years.
- Julius and Ethel Rosenberg – an American couple tasked with recruiting potential Soviet spies. Among those recruited was Ethel's brother, David Greenglass, a machinist at Los Alamos National Lab. Julius and Ethel Rosenberg were tried for conspiracy to commit espionage. Treason charges were not applicable, since the United States and the Soviet Union were allies at the time. The Rosenbergs denied all charges but were convicted in a trial in which the prosecutor Roy Cohn later said he was in daily secret contact with the judge, Irving Kaufman. Despite international demands for clemency and multiple appeals to President Dwight D. Eisenhower by leading European intellectuals (including Pope Pius XII), the Rosenbergs were both executed in 1953. President Eisenhower wrote to his son, serving in Korea at that time, that if he spared Ethel (presumably for the sake of her two young children), then the Soviets would recruit their spies from amongst women.
- Saville Sax – an American, acted as the courier for Klaus Fuchs and Theodore Hall. Sax and Hall had been roommates at Harvard University.
- Oscar Seborer – an American, worked at Los Alamos from 1944 to 1946 as part of a unit that studied the seismological effects of the Trinity nuclear test. Codenamed "Godsend" by the Soviets, he defected to the Soviet Union in 1951, and received the Order of the Red Star. He lived under the alias "Smith" and died in 2015. His identity was only revealed publicly in 2019.
- Morton Sobell – an American engineer, he was tried and convicted of conspiracy, along with the Rosenbergs. He was sentenced to 30 years imprisonment in Alcatraz, but was released in 1969 on appeal and for good behavior after serving 17 years and 9 months. In 2008, Sobell admitted to passing information to the Soviets, although he said it was all for defensive systems. He implicated Julius Rosenberg, in an interview with the New York Times published in September 2008.
- Melita Norwood – a British Communist, was an active Russian spy since at least 1938 and was never detected. Employed as a secretary in the British Non-Ferrous Metals Research Association since 1932, she was linked to the Woolwich Arsenal spy ring of 1938. In wartime she was seconded to "Tube Alloys", the secret British nuclear research project. She was later considered "the most important female agent ever recruited by the USSR". She was first suspected as a security risk in 1965 but never prosecuted. Her spying career was revealed by Vasili Mitrokhin in 1999, when she was still alive but long retired.
- Arthur Adams – a Soviet spy who passed information about the Manhattan Project.

== Gallery ==
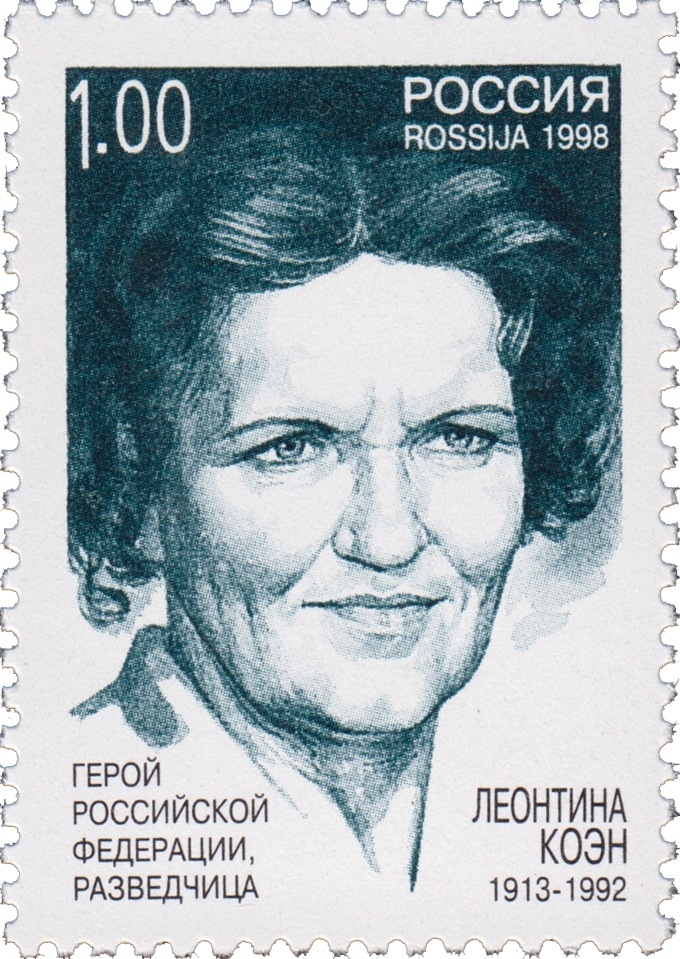
Lona Cohen on Russian stamp

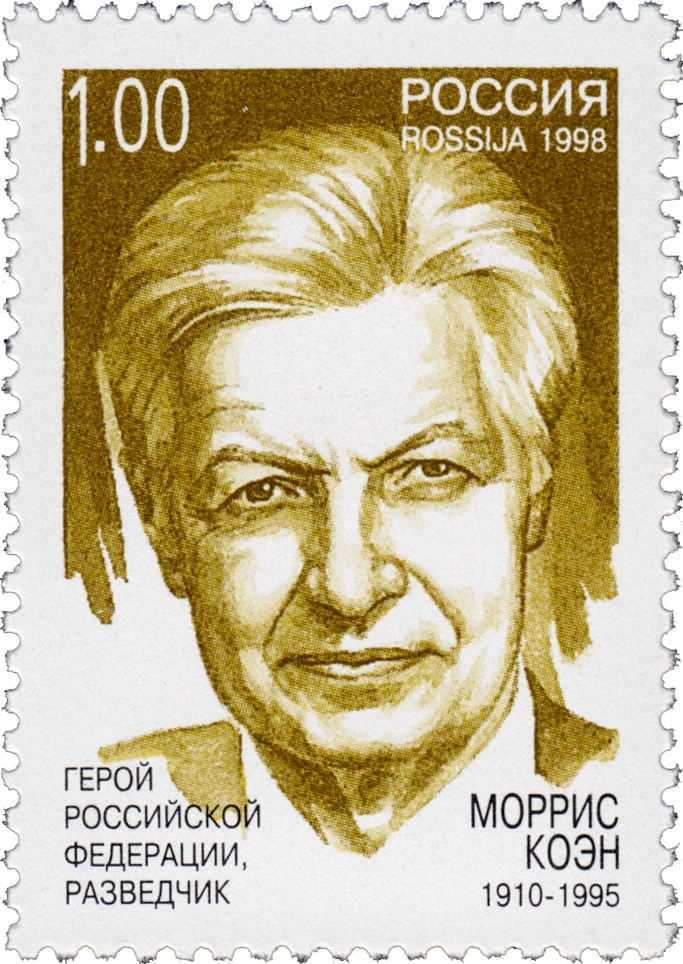
Morris Cohen on Russian stamp

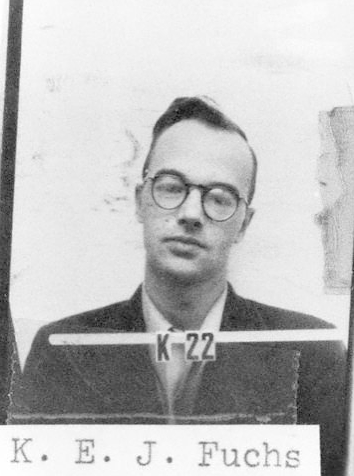
Klaus Fuchs ID badge photo from Los Alamos National Laboratory

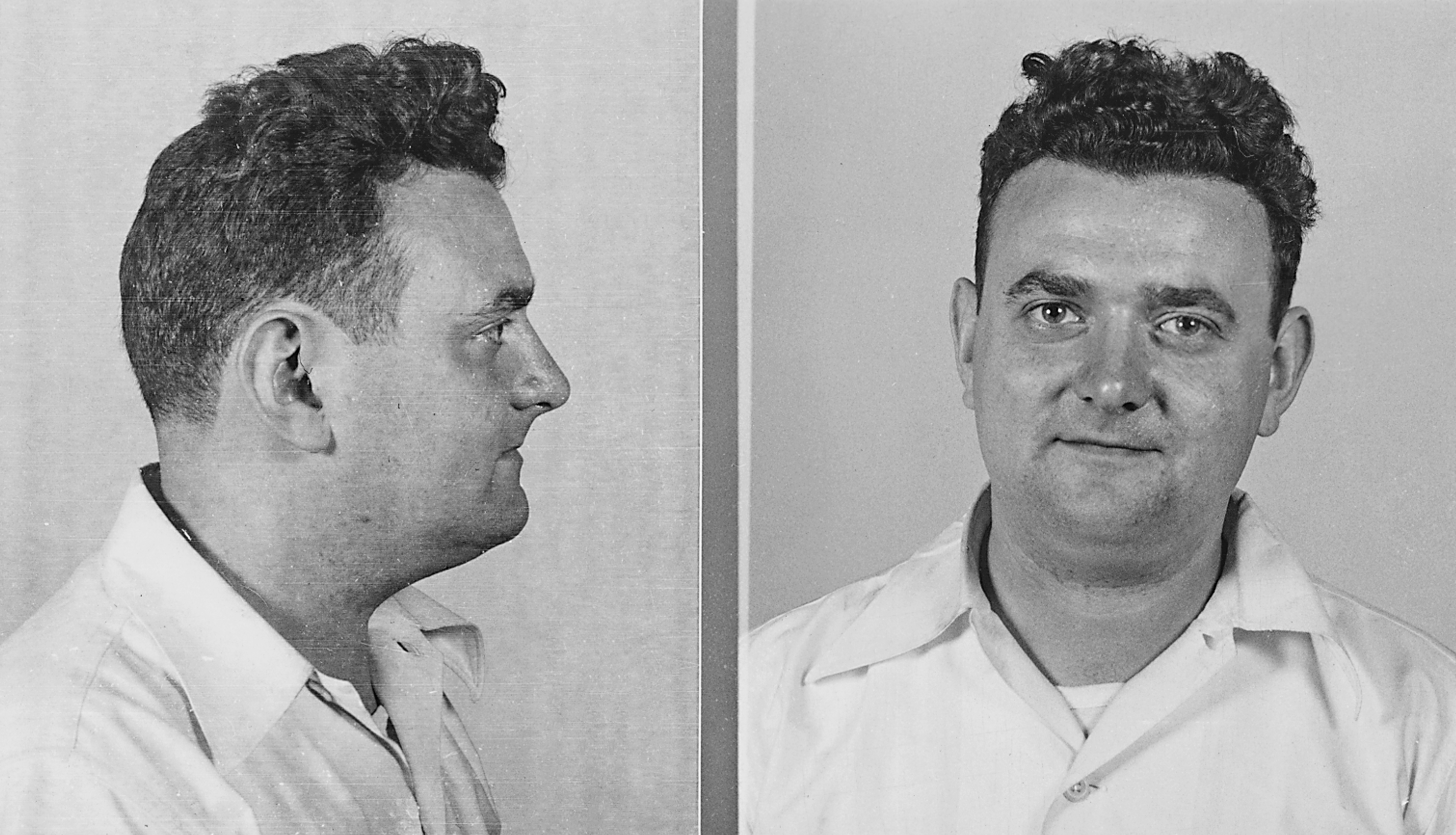
Mugshot of David Greenglass

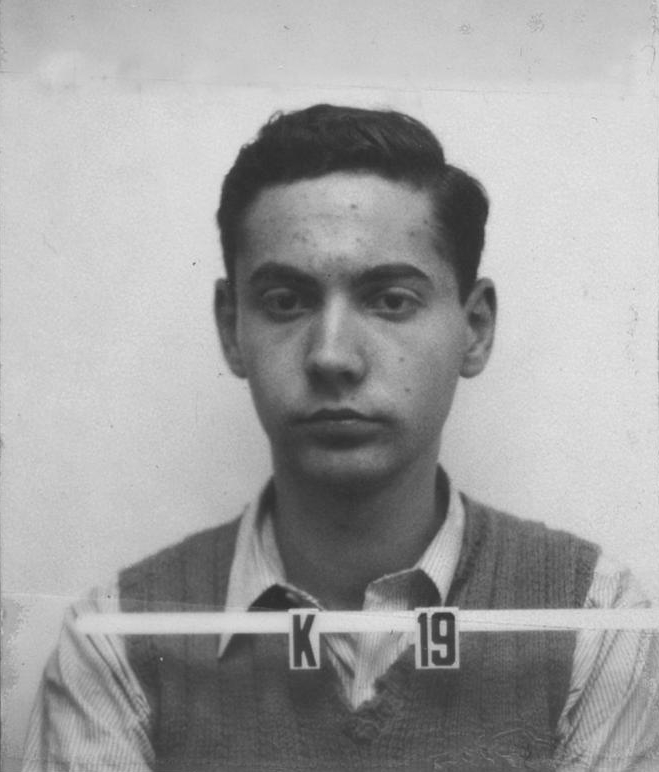
Theodore Hall's ID badge photo from Los Alamos National Laboratory

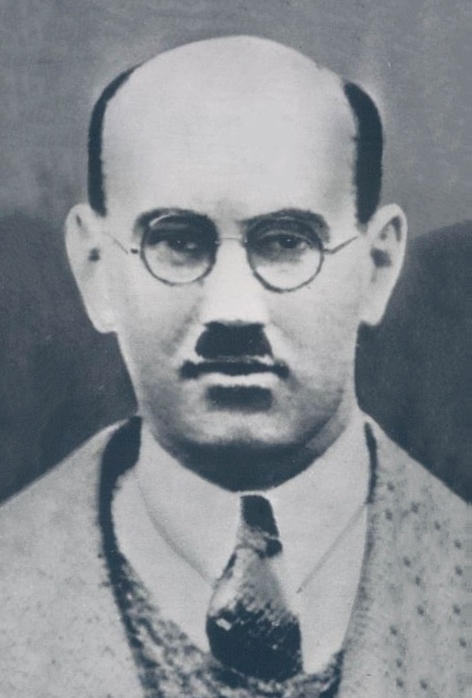
Alan Nunn May, University of Cambridge physicist

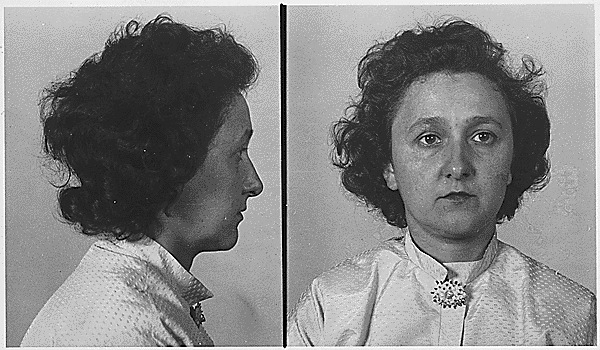
Mugshot of Ethel Rosenberg

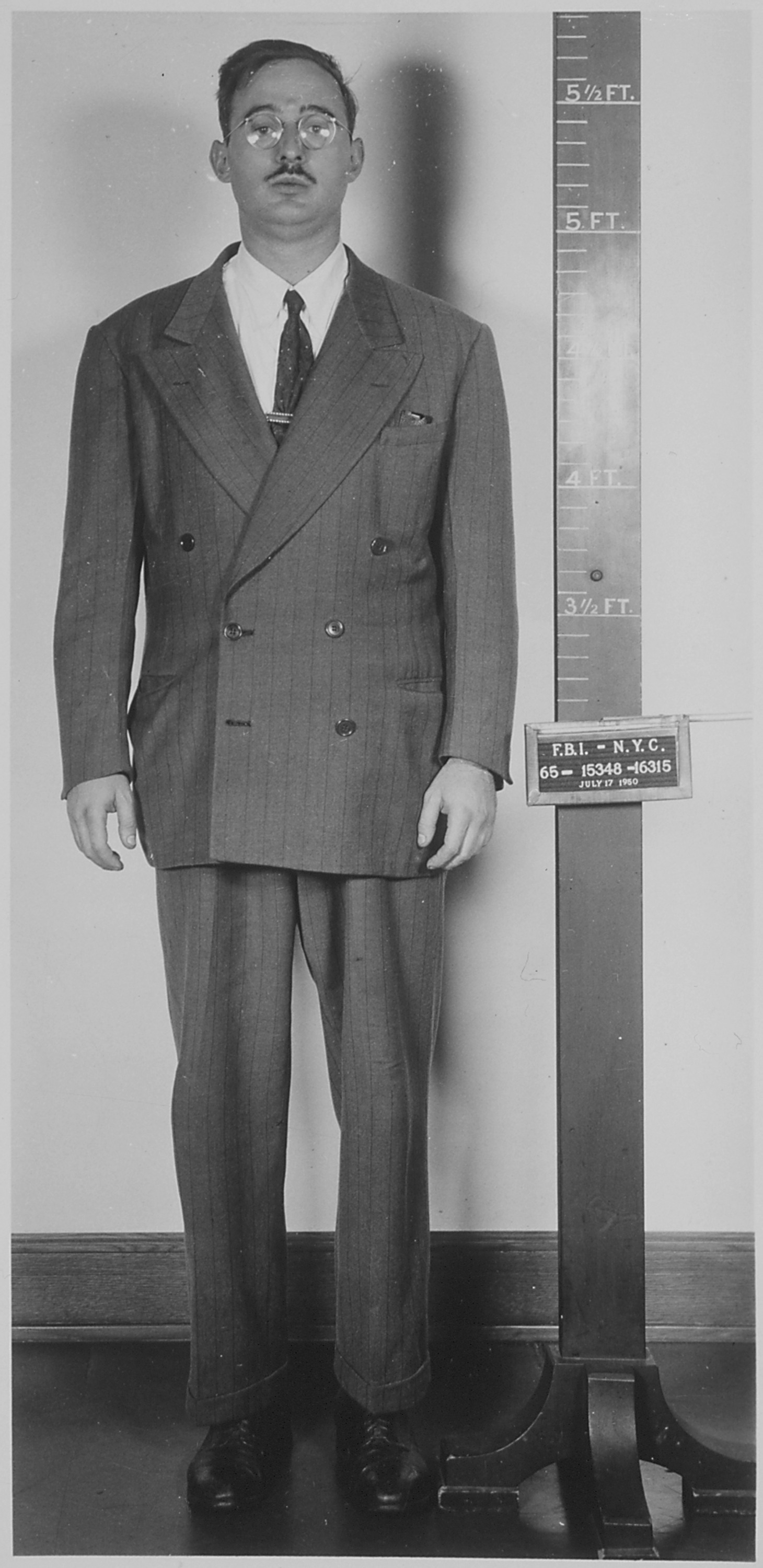
Police photograph of Julius Rosenberg after his arrest

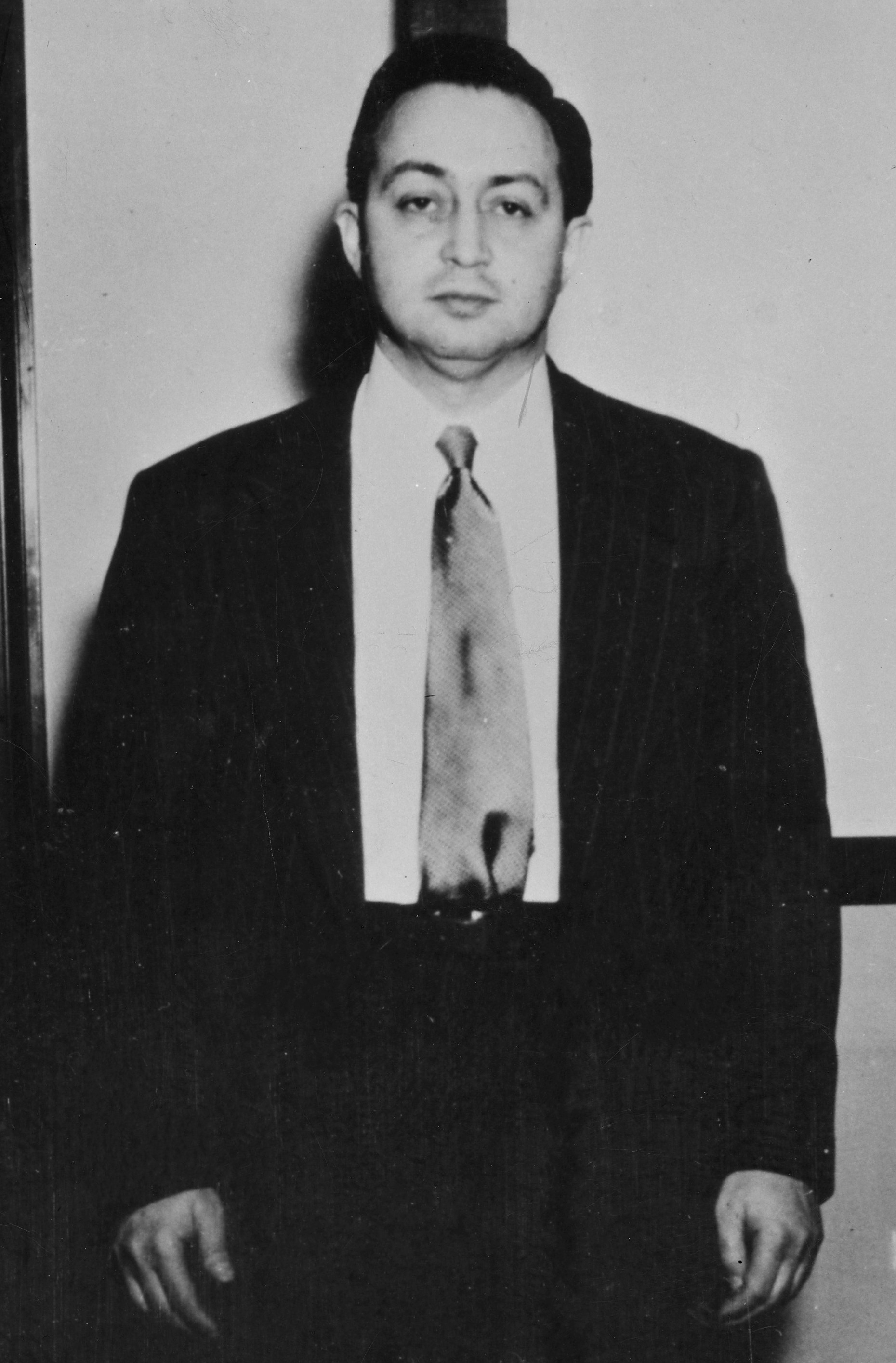
Harry Gold after his arrest by the Federal Bureau of Investigation

== See also ==
- History of espionage
- Soviet espionage in the United States
- Wen Ho Lee
