= Harry Gold =

American chemist and Second World War Soviet spy

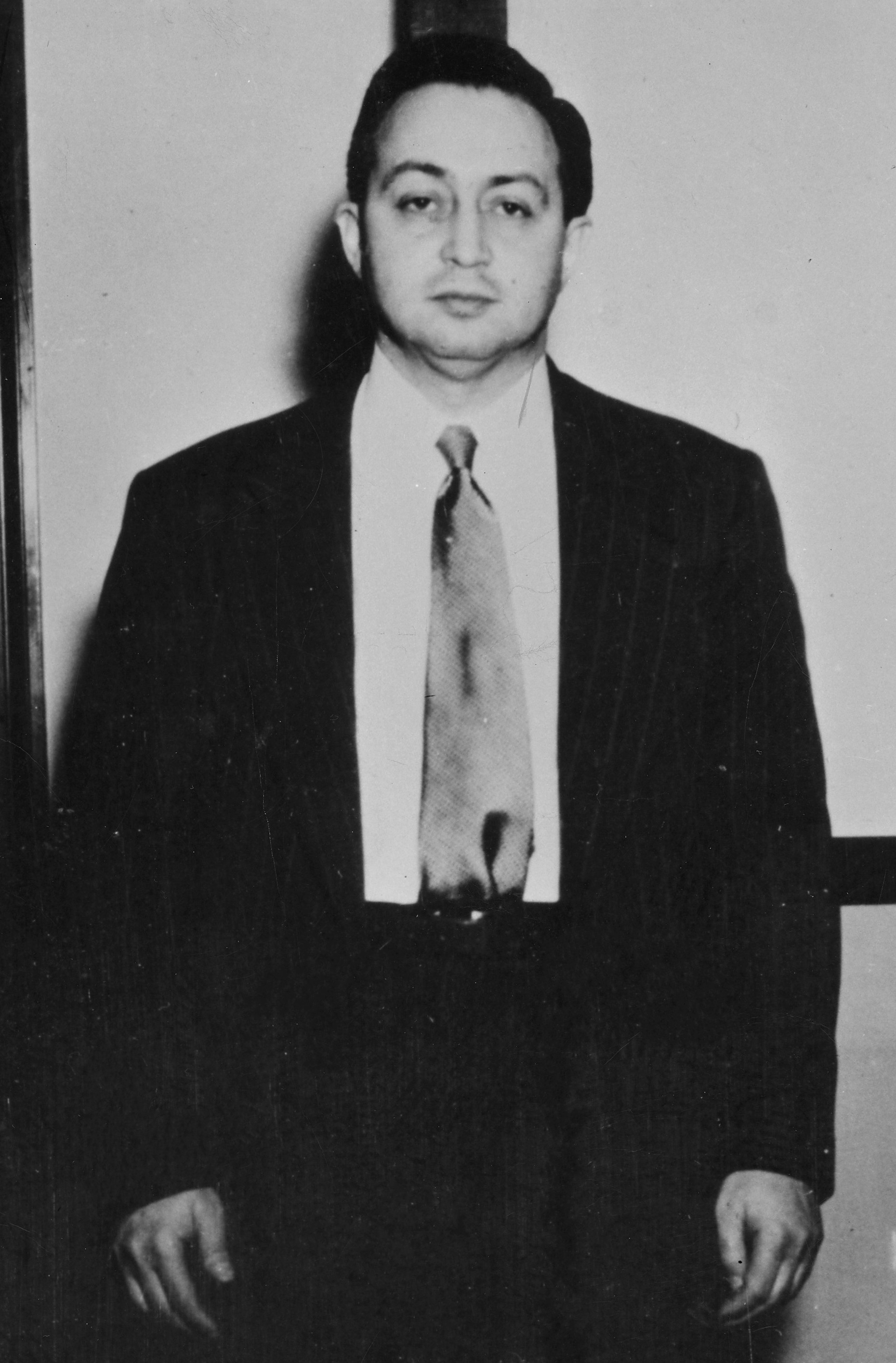
- Gold after his arrest by the FBI
- Born: Henrich Golodnitsky; December 11, 1910; Bern, Switzerland
- Died: August 28, 1972 (aged 61); Philadelphia, Pennsylvania, United States
- Resting place: Har Nebo Cemetery
- Occupations: Laboratory chemist, Soviet agent.
- Status: Deceased
- Conviction: Conspiracy to commit espionage (50 U.S.C. § 32)
- Penalty: 30 years imprisonment

Harry Gold (born Henrich Golodnitsky, December 11, 1910 – August 28, 1972) was an American laboratory chemist who was convicted as a courier for the Soviet Union passing atomic secrets from Klaus Fuchs, an agent of the Soviet Union, during World War II. Gold served as a government witness and testified in the case of Julius and Ethel Rosenberg, who were convicted and executed in 1953 for their roles. Gold served 15 years in prison.

Born in Bern, Switzerland, to parents from the Russian Empire, Gold immigrated to the US with his parents as a child at the age of four and settled in Philadelphia. During the Great Depression, he found work and finished his degree in chemistry at night. He returned to work as a clinical chemist after release from prison.

== Early life ==
Heinrich Golodnitsky was born on December 11, 1910, in Bern, Switzerland to Samson and Celia (Ominsky) Golodnitsky, both Jewish immigrants from what is now Ukraine and was then part of the Russian Empire. Samson had grown up in Smila, where his father was a successful merchant. He was sent to Switzerland for additional schooling, as opportunities for Jews were limited in Russia, but he was influenced by reading Leo Tolstoy and chose to go into woodworking. He became a carpenter. Henrich's mother, Celia, first emigrated from central occupied Ukraine (annexed lands of the Russian Empire) as a teenager to Paris, where she studied dentistry. She supported the Zionist movement. After running out of money, she took a job in a cigar factory in Bern, where she met Samson. They married around 1907 or 1908.

When Heinrich was 4, his family immigrated to the United States, seeking more opportunity. After they arrived at New York in July 1914, an agent at Ellis Island suggested they shorten their surname to Gold, to which they agreed. In the United States, the boy became known as Harry. They first went to Chicago, where Sam worked in a coalyard and Celia in a tobacco factory, both limited by their lack of English. After a year, they left. Sam went to Norfolk, Virginia, where he had some relatives. Celia took their son to Philadelphia, where her brother Shama had settled. When the shipyard job and conditions in Norfolk did not work out, Sam joined them in Philadelphia, a major industrial city. They settled in South Philadelphia in 1915 in the Jewish section. Ethnic Irish occupied territory to the north, and Italians to the west. After some other jobs, Sam found work as a cabinetmaker at the Victor Talking Machine Company in Camden, New Jersey, across the Delaware River.

In 1917, Gold’s mother had another son, named Yussel (Joseph), after a grandfather. Neighbors on Philip Street later described the Gold family as unusually quiet and stand-offish, but Harry Gold said he had a happy and secure childhood. He greatly enjoyed learning and was a good student in school. To supplement Sam's modest earnings, Celia taught Hebrew and Yiddish to neighborhood children, and was considered an excellent teacher. She expanded the lessons with Jewish folklore and Hebrew literature.

In the early 20th century, immigrant groups in Philadelphia clashed over territory. As a boy in the neighborhood, Gold suffered from this, especially since he was small and slight and non-athletic. His father complained of discrimination by newly hired Italian immigrants at the Victor Company, where he was one of the few Jews. In the mid-1920s, an Irish foreman tried to drive him out of the factory, but he persisted. Gold admired his father's stoicism but resented the conflicts, and this experience developed a desire in him to fight prejudice. He had an early interest in chemistry and graduated from South Philadelphia High School in 1929.

== Early career ==
After high school graduation, Gold was offered a job by one of his father’s acquaintances at Giftcrafters, a woodworking firm in the northern Kensington section of the city.

While seeking other positions, Gold found employment at the Pennsylvania Sugar Company. Employment there provided economic security and the opportunity to work with college-educated chemists in state-of-the art labs. He saved money from his work and attended the University of Pennsylvania full time from 1930 to 1932 before his money ran out. The Great Depression was unfolding, and he returned to Pennsylvania Sugar to help his family.

== Great Depression, work, and espionage ==
Gold had expressed interest in the Socialist Party early in life, influenced by his mother, and the family bought the Jewish Daily Forward. He later said that he thought Communism was related to "a wild and vaguely defined phenomenon going on in a primitive country thousands of miles away." For other Americans, the economic crisis challenged faith in capitalism. A week before Christmas 1932, Gold was laid off by the sugar company. Both Harry and his father Sam looked for work each morning, to no avail. The Gold family faced economic ruin.

Gold was offered a job by Tom Black, a former classmate, at the Holbrook Manufacturing Company in Jersey City. Black befriended him and tried to recruit Gold to the Communist Party. Grateful to Black for his friendship and a chance to work, Gold reluctantly became involved. But he continued to hold views against the Party. When Gold found that the PA Sugar Company was hiring at the same salary he was making, he decided to return to the company, Philadelphia, and his family. Black visited Gold and his family, all the while encouraging him to attend communist meetings and join the party.

In 1934, Gold started passing industrial secrets to Black from the sugar company. During this time, Gold also attended Drexel Institute of Technology, taking night courses in chemistry with the goal of pursuing a career in that field.

In 1940, senior NKVD spymaster Jacob Golos recruited Gold to be a spy for the Soviet Union, but Golos was not a recruited agent of the rezidentura. In the late 1940s, Soviet Case Officer Semyon Semenov appropriated Gold from Golos for use by the NKVD. Gold became a formally recruited Soviet agent at this time, and was assigned the codename GUS, GOS, or GOOSE. Semenov remained Gold's control officer until March 1944.

After the war, tensions increased between the US and the Soviet Union following its takeover of territory in Eastern Europe. Communist governments led East Germany, Poland, Yugoslavia, and other eastern nations dominated by the Soviet Union. The Cold War between the US and the Soviet Union had begun.

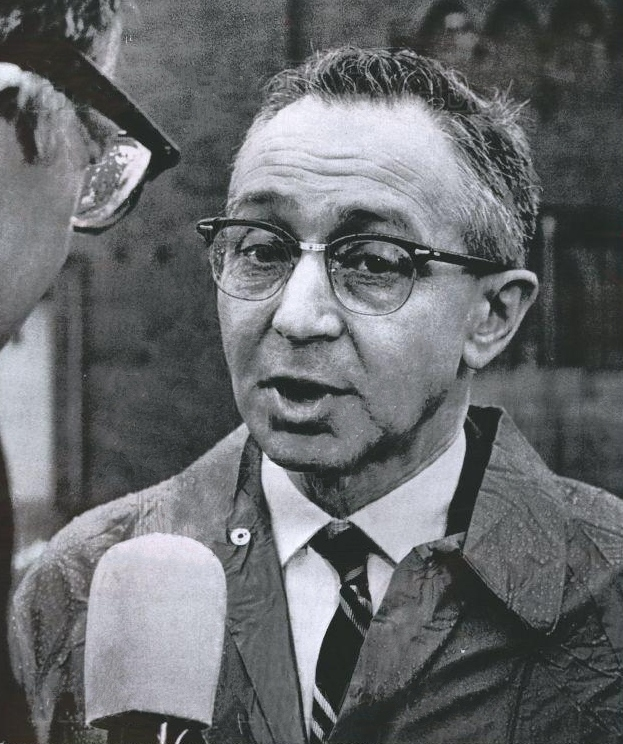
Gold in 1966

In 1950, Klaus Fuchs, an NKVD agent, was arrested in England and charged with espionage. Fuchs confessed that while working in the United States during World War II, he had passed information about the atom bomb to the Soviet Union, which had then been a US ally. Fuchs denied working with other spies, except for a courier who collected information from him. When initially shown photographs of suspects, including Gold, Fuchs refused to identify him. After prompting by the prosecution, he identified Gold.

Gold was arrested that year. Under interrogation by US law enforcement officials, he admitted that he had been involved in espionage since 1934 and had helped Fuchs pass classified documents from the Manhattan Project to Soviet General Consul Anatoli Yakovlev. Gold's confession identified many other people connected to the espionage network and led to the arrest of David Greenglass. Greenglass worked as a machinist at the Manhattan Project and had also passed material to Gold. Greenglass's cooperation resulted in the 1950 arrest of his sister Ethel and her husband Julius Rosenberg, who were also charged with conspiracy to commit espionage. Gold cooperated and was a prosecution witness in the trial of the Rosenbergs, as was Greenglass. The latter's testimony contributed to their convictions and death sentences; they were executed.

Unable to make the $100,000 bail, Gold was jailed for 7 and a half months before his trial. In 1951, he was convicted and sentenced to 30 years' imprisonment. In May 1965, one of his appeals resulted in his being paroled for good behavior after serving less than half that time. He was also credited for the time in jail before his trial.

Gold returned to Philadelphia. He worked as a clinical chemist in the pathology lab of John F. Kennedy Memorial Hospital, and ultimately for the chief pathologist. He died on August 28, 1972, during heart surgery, at the age of 61. He had never married. He was interred in Har Nebo Cemetery in Philadelphia County, Pennsylvania.

== Representation in other media ==
- Richard Rhodes's book, Dark Sun: The Making of the Hydrogen Bomb (1995), includes information about Harry Gold and his role in Soviet espionage.
- Millicent Dillon's novel, "Harry Gold: A Novel" (2000; the Overlook Press) ISBN 1-58567-012-X
- Steve Sheinkin's book, "Bomb" (2014) ISBN 978-1596434875
- Allen Hornblum's book: "The invisible Harry Gold : the man who gave the Soviets the atom bomb" (Yale University Press, 2010) ISBN 9780300156768. Most known information about Gold.

== See also ==
- Atomic Spies
- The Cold War
