= Ruth Greenglass =

American spy for the Soviet Union (1924–2008)

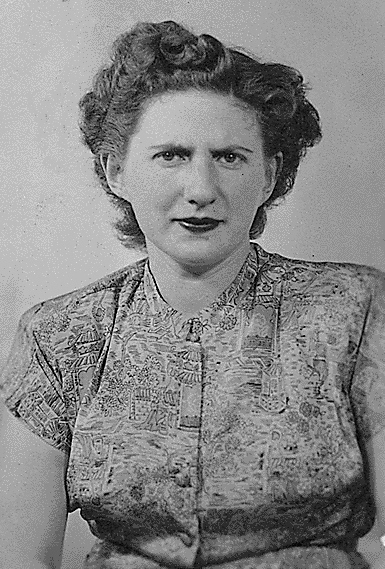
- Born: Ruth Leah Printz; April 30, 1924; New York City, U.S.
- Died: April 7, 2008 (aged 83); New York City, U.S.
- Known for: Spy for the Soviet Union
- Spouse: David Greenglass (m. 1942)
- Children: 2
- Relatives: Ethel Rosenberg (sister-in-law)

Ruth Leah Greenglass (née Printz; April 30, 1924 – April 7, 2008) was an American citizen who acted as a spy for the Soviet Union along with her husband, David Greenglass.

== Early life ==
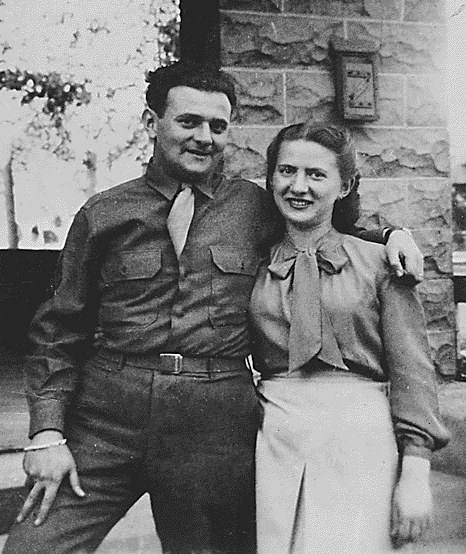
David and Ruth Greenglass

Ruth Leah Printz was born to a Jewish family on April 30, 1924, in New York City to Max Printz and Tillie Leiter. She grew up in the same neighborhood, the Lower East Side, as her future husband, David Greenglass. She graduated with honors from Seward Park High School at 16. Although quite young, she and Greenglass wanted to marry before he was drafted to serve in World War II. They married in late November 1942 when he was 20 and she was 18. They shared an interest in politics and joined the Young Communist League.

== Espionage ==
Julius Rosenberg became a Soviet agent, working under Alexander Feklissov. In September 1944, Rosenberg suggested to Feklissov to consider recruiting his brother-in-law, David, and his wife. Feklissov met the couple and on September 21, he reported to Moscow: "They are young, intelligent, capable, and politically developed people, strongly believing in the cause of communism and wishing to do their best to help our country as much as possible. They are undoubtedly devoted to us (the Soviet Union)."

David wrote to his wife, "My darling, I most certainly will be glad to be part of the community project (espionage) that Julius and his friends (the Russians) have in mind."

After her husband was drafted and inducted into the Army in 1943, Ruth continued to visit him. In November 1944, she visited him in Albuquerque, New Mexico, where he was working as a machinist on the Manhattan Project at Los Alamos. During that visit, she asked him to forward any information on the project to his brother-in-law, Julius.

== Rosenberg trial ==
When the FBI questioned him about suspected espionage activities, David agreed to confess to his activities and to testify against Julius and Ethel Rosenberg in exchange for immunity for his wife so that she could remain at home with their two children.

At the trial, Ruth implicated Ethel in the espionage ring by testifying that Ethel had typed the notes that David had provided. Ruth testified that both Rosenbergs had urged her to persuade her husband to become involved in espionage. Ruth's testimony was crucial in securing Ethel's conviction.

== Later life ==
She rejoined her husband after his release from prison in 1960, and they lived in New York City under assumed names with their children.

She died on April 7, 2008, at the age of 83, a fact that became widely known only when the government, numbering her among the deceased witnesses, released her grand jury testimony a few weeks later. David Greenglass died in 2014, aged 92.

== Reliability ==
The truth of Ruth Printz Greenglass's testimony at the Rosenberg trial has been questioned.

In September 2008, her grand jury transcripts were released and showed that when testifying before the grand jury in August 1950, she was asked, "Didn't you write the information down on a piece of paper?" She replied, "Yes, I wrote the information down on a piece of paper and Julius Rosenberg took it with him."

At the trial, she testified that Ethel had typed the notes about the atomic bomb.
