= George Koval =

American born Soviet intelligence officer and scientist (1913–2006)

- Born: George Abramovich Koval; December 25, 1913; Sioux City, Iowa, U.S.
- Died: January 31, 2006 (aged 92); Moscow, Russia
- Education: D. Mendeleev University of Chemical Technology of Russia (BS); Columbia University; City College of New York
- Awards: Hero of the Russian Federation; Decoration "For Service in Military Intelligence"
- Espionage activity
- Allegiance: Soviet Union
- Service branch: GRU
- Codename: Delmar
- Operations: Manhattan Project infiltration

George Abramovich Koval (Russian: Жорж (Георгий) Абрамович Коваль, IPA: [ˈʐorʐ (ɡʲɪˈorɡʲɪj) ɐˈbraməvʲɪtɕ kɐˈvalʲ], Zhorzh Abramovich Koval; December 25, 1913 – January 31, 2006) was an American engineer who acted as a Soviet intelligence officer for the Soviet atomic bomb project. Koval's infiltration of the Manhattan Project as a GRU (Soviet military intelligence) agent reduced the time it took for the Soviet Union to develop nuclear weapons.

Koval was born in Sioux City, Iowa, to Jewish emigrants from the part of the Russian Empire that is now Belarus. As an adult, he traveled with his parents to the Soviet Union to settle in the Jewish Autonomous Region near the Chinese border. Koval was recruited by the GRU, trained, and assigned the code name DELMAR. He returned to the United States in 1940 and was drafted into the U.S. Army in early 1943. Koval worked at atomic research laboratories and, according to the Russian government, relayed back to the Soviet Union information about the production processes and volumes of the polonium, plutonium, and uranium used in American atomic weaponry, and descriptions of the weapon production sites. In 1948, Koval left on a European vacation but never returned to the United States. In 2000, the Ministry of Defence of the Russian Federation awarded Koval with a military decoration "For Service in Military Intelligence" for his service for the GRU. That year, he gathered his pupils for some sort of celebration and finally admitted that he was a Russian spy in the 1940s. On November 2, 2007, Russian president Vladimir Putin posthumously awarded Koval the Hero of the Russian Federation decoration for his service.

== Early life ==
George Koval's father, Abram Koval, left his home town of Telekhany, Russian Empire (now Belarus) to emigrate to the United States in 1910. Abram, a carpenter, settled in Sioux City, Iowa, which, at the turn of the 20th century, was home to a sizeable Jewish community of merchants and craftsmen. Many of these settlers had emigrated from the Russian Empire, in which Jews had been ruthlessly persecuted under the czar's anti-Semitic policies and pogroms. Abram and his wife Ethel Shenitsky Koval raised three sons: Isaya, born 1912; George (or Zhorzh), born 1913; and Gabriel, born 1919.

George Koval attended Central High School, a red-brick Victorian building better known as "the Castle on the Hill". Neighbors recalled that Koval spoke openly of his communist beliefs. While attending Central High he was a member of the Honor Society and the debate team. He graduated in 1929 at age 15. Meanwhile, his parents left Sioux City as the Great Depression deepened. Abram Koval became the secretary for ICOR, the Organization for Jewish Colonization in the Soviet Union. Founded by American Jewish communists in 1924, the group helped to finance and publicize the development of the "Jewish Autonomous Region", the Soviet answer to Jewish emigration to the British Mandate of Palestine then being undertaken by the Zionist movement. The Koval family emigrated in 1932, traveling with a United States family passport. They settled in Birobidzhan, near the border of Manchuria.

The Koval family worked on a collective farm and were profiled by an American communist daily newspaper in New York City. The journalist Paul Novick wrote that the family "had exchanged the uncertainty of life as small storekeepers ... for a worry-free existence for themselves and their children." While Isaya became a tractor driver, George Koval improved his Russian language skills in the collective and began studies at the Mendeleev Institute of Chemical Technology in 1934. At the university, he met and married fellow student Lyudmila Ivanova. Koval graduated with honors in five years and received Soviet citizenship.

== Recruitment and espionage ==
At some point Koval was recruited by the Soviet Main Intelligence Directorate (Главное Разведывательное Управление), or GRU. By the time he received his degree he had left Moscow under orders as part of a subterfuge. He was drafted into the Soviet army in 1939 to explain his sudden disappearance from the city. Though his parents had relinquished their US family passport, Koval returned to the US in 1940, replacing a spy recalled during Stalin's purges. His code name was Delmar. Arriving in San Francisco, he traveled to New York City and enrolled at Columbia University. According to Arnold Kramish, an American colleague he befriended and with whom he re-established contact in 2000, it was there that Koval assumed deputy command of the local GRU cell. This outpost operated under the cover of the Raven Electric Company, a supplier to firms such as General Electric. Koval told coworkers he was a native New Yorker and an only child. He ingratiated himself with everyone he met. While Koval originally worked under a pseudonym, gathering information on toxins for use in chemical weapons, his handlers decided to have him work under his real name.

During the beginning of World War II, Congress had re-introduced the draft (conscription) in September 1940, and Koval registered for it on January 2, 1941. Raven Electric Company secured him a year's deferment from service until February 1942. According to historian Vladimir Lota, Koval's handlers wanted him to steal information about chemical weapons and felt that he would not be able to do so while drafted. When the deferment expired, Koval was inducted into the United States Army. He received basic training at Fort Dix in New Jersey before being sent to The Citadel in Charleston, South Carolina. There, Koval served as a private in the 3410th Specialized Training and Reassignment Unit. On August 11, 1943, he was transferred to the Army Specialized Training Program, a unit established in December 1942 to provide talented enlistees with an education and technical training. Koval attended the City College of New York (CCNY) and studied electrical engineering. His CCNY classmates looked up to the older Koval as a role model and father figure who never did homework and was a noted ladies' man, never knowing about his Soviet education and wife. Colleagues recalled that he never discussed politics or the Soviet Union.

=== Atomic secrets ===
Oak Ridge workers operating calutrons. Koval's job as a health officer meant he had his own car and access to many sensitive areas of the facility.

The Specialized Training Program was dissolved in early 1944, as the progress of the war tipped in favor of the Allies; many of the CCNY classmates were transferred to the infantry, while Koval and a dozen others were selected for the Special Engineer Detachment. The Detachment was part of the covert project to design, engineer, and fabricate an atomic bomb—an American, Canadian and British initiative known as the Manhattan Project. Koval was assigned to Oak Ridge, Tennessee; at the time, project scientists were researching enriched uranium and plutonium-based bombs, with the Oak Ridge laboratories central to the development of both. The project suffered from a lack of human resources and asked the Army for technically qualified men.

Koval enjoyed free access to much of Oak Ridge; he was made a "health physics officer" and monitored radiation levels across the facility. According to Federal Bureau of Investigation records, the job gave him top-secret security clearance. At the time, project scientists discovered reactor-produced plutonium was too unstable for the intended bomb designs, and that polonium initiators (urchin) were needed for the necessary chain reactions to occur. Koval was charged by his handlers with watching Oak Ridge's polonium supply to transmit information about it through a Soviet contact named "Clyde". His information reached Moscow via coded dispatches, couriers, and the Soviet Embassy. Among the intelligence he sent was that Oak Ridge's polonium was being sent to another project site at Los Alamos National Laboratory.

Koval was transferred from Oak Ridge to a top-secret lab in Dayton, Ohio, on June 27, 1945, where polonium initiators were fabricated. The world's first atomic bomb was detonated in New Mexico on July 16. Atomic bombs were dropped on Japan on August 6 and 9. The Soviet Union responded by increasing efforts to develop its own atomic bomb. While the American Central Intelligence Agency estimated the Soviets would not succeed until 1950–53, the first Soviet atomic bomb was detonated on August 29, 1949. The initiator for the plutonium bomb was, according to Russian military officials, "prepared to the 'recipe' provided by military intelligence agent Delmar [Koval]".

== Later years ==
After World War II, Koval was discharged from the Army. He returned to New York and CCNY, where he received his bachelor's degree in electrical engineering on February 1, 1948. Telling his friends he was thinking about taking a trip to Poland or Israel, Koval secured a passport for six months' travel to Europe. According to the Russian publication Rossiyskaya Gazeta, he might have left because American counter-intelligence agents had discovered Soviet literature about his parents after being tipped off about the leak by a Soviet defector. He left by sea in October 1948 and never returned to his birth country. In Russia, he had left the Soviet military with discharge papers as an untrained rifleman and the rank of private. His foreign background and service record made him "a very suspicious character", he wrote to Kramish. Turned down for education and research positions, Koval turned to his old GRU contact, who secured him a job as a laboratory assistant at the Mendeleev Institute. Eventually, Koval managed to obtain a teaching job there; his students often laughed at his foreign pronunciations for technical terms.

While other spies such as Julius and Ethel Rosenberg and Klaus Fuchs were caught after the war, Koval apparently went unscrutinized for years. Among the reasons given for his maintained cover was that inter-service politics undermined efforts to perform proper security checks on employees. Another possibility is that the U.S. government chose scientific ability over clear records and political sympathies. In the 1950s, the FBI investigated his wartime activities and interviewed his former colleagues, leaving them with the impression that he might have been a spy. The matter was kept confidential for 60 years as the US was afraid of the damage that would result from the exposure of Koval's activities.

In 1999, Koval was living on his small pension in Russia and had heard that U.S. war veterans like himself could apply for Social Security payments. He applied. In 2000, the Social Security Administration's Office of Central Operations, Baltimore, Maryland responded with a one-sentence letter: "We are writing to tell you that you do not qualify for retirement benefits."

Koval described his 57 years of post-spy life living in Russia as "uneventful". His family knew he had done work for the GRU, but the subject was never discussed. He did not receive any high awards upon his return, a fact that bothered him. Bigger awards went to "career men", he told Kramish. However, he ended his correspondence by saying that he was not protesting his treatment; "[I am thankful] that I did not find myself in a Gulag, as might well have happened." Koval died in his Moscow apartment on January 31, 2006.

Koval's activities as a spy began to emerge after the publication of a 2002 book, The GRU and the Atomic Bomb, which mentions Koval by his code name and lists him as one of a handful of spies who evaded counterintelligence groups. On November 3, 2007, he received the posthumous title of Hero of the Russian Federation bestowed by Russian president Vladimir Putin. When Koval was honored, the Russian presidential proclamation stated, "Mr Koval, who operated under the pseudonym Delmar, provided information that helped speed up considerably the time it took for the Soviet Union to develop an atomic bomb of its own." Historian John Earl Haynes argues that Delmar's contributions were exaggerated, as part of what Michael Sulick describes as part of boosting Putin's "nationalist agenda".
