= David Greenglass =

Atomic spy for the Soviet Union (1922–2014)

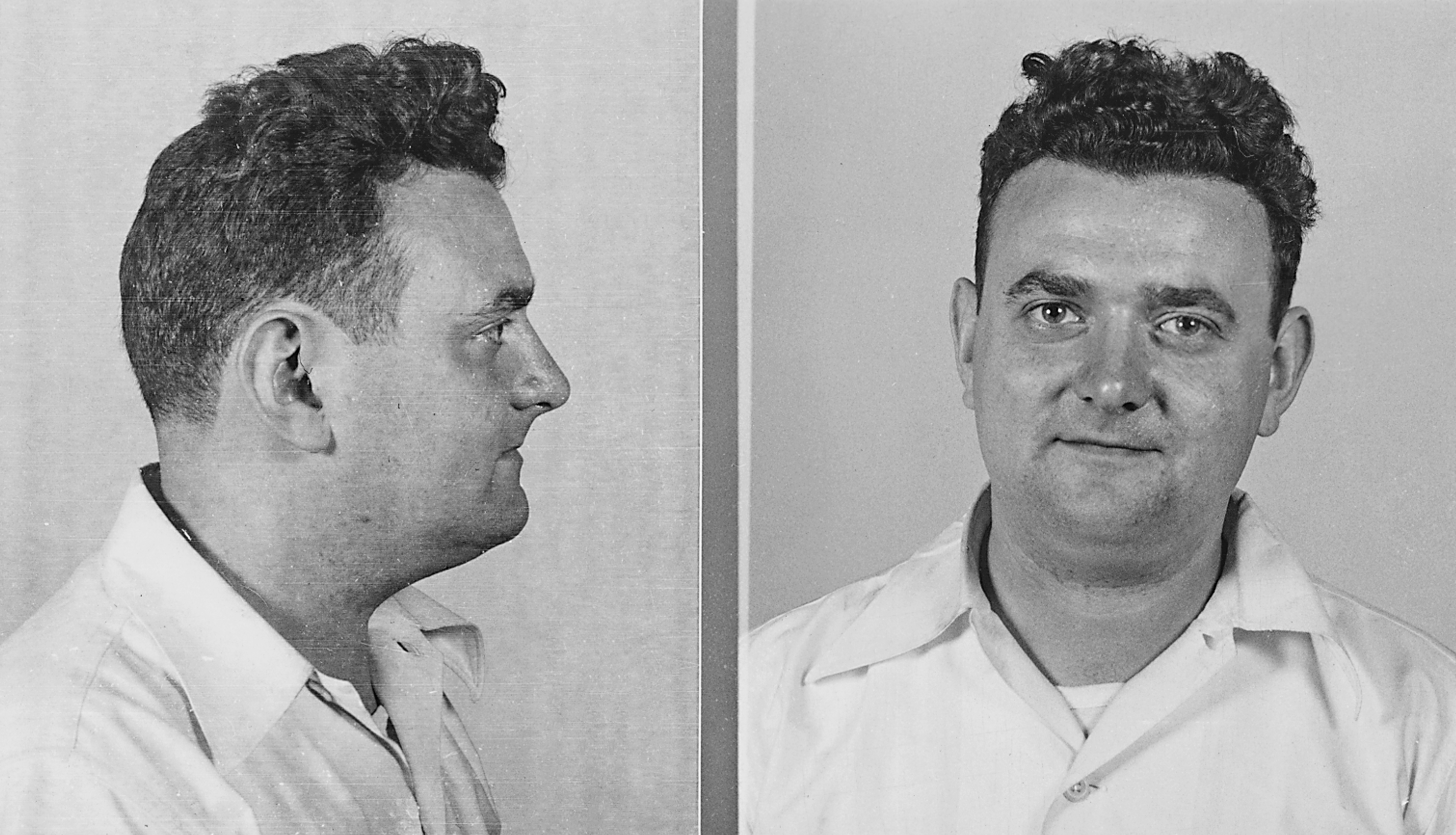
- Greenglass c. 1950
- Born: March 2, 1922; New York City, U.S.
- Died: July 1, 2014 (aged 92); New York City, U.S.
- Known for: Atomic spy for the Soviet Union
- Spouse: Ruth Printz (m. 1942; died 2008)
- Children: 2
- Relatives: Ethel Rosenberg (sister); Michael Meeropol (nephew); Robert Meeropol (nephew)

David Greenglass (March 2, 1922 – July 1, 2014) was an American machinist who worked on the Manhattan Project and was an atomic spy for the Soviet Union. He was briefly stationed at the Clinton Engineer Works uranium enrichment facility at Oak Ridge, Tennessee, and then worked at the Los Alamos Laboratory in New Mexico from August 1944 until February 1946.

He provided testimony that helped convict his sister and brother-in-law Ethel and Julius Rosenberg, who were executed for their spying activity. Greenglass served nine and a half years in prison.

== Early life and career ==
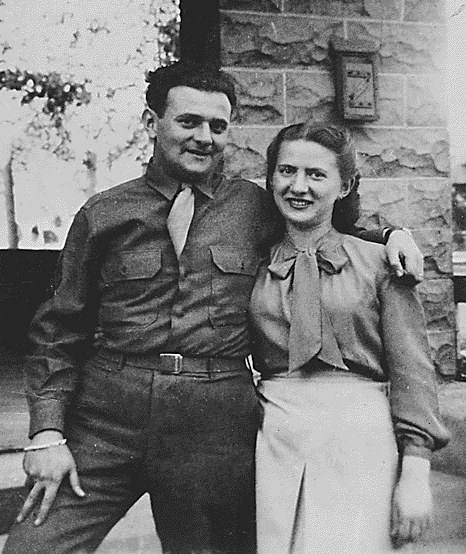
David and Ruth Greenglass

Greenglass was born in 1922 on the Lower East Side of Manhattan in New York City, as the youngest of three children. His parents were Jewish immigrants Barnet "Barney" Greenglass (1875–1949), from Minsk, Russian Empire, (modern-day Belarus), and Theresa "Tessie" Feit (1888–1958), from Kombornia, Austrian Galicia (modern-day Poland). He attended Haaren High School and graduated in 1940. He attended Brooklyn Polytechnic Institute but did not graduate.

Greenglass married Ruth Printz in 1942, when she was 18 years old. The two joined the Young Communist League shortly before Greenglass entered the U.S. Army in April 1943. They had a son and a daughter. He worked as a machinist at Fort Ord in California and then at the Mississippi Ordnance Plant in Jackson, Mississippi. In July 1944, Greenglass was assigned to the secret Manhattan Project, the wartime project to develop the first atomic weapons. He was first stationed at the Clinton Engineer Works uranium enrichment facility at Oak Ridge, Tennessee, but was there for less than two weeks. In August 1944, he was sent to the Los Alamos Laboratory in New Mexico. In order to gain his security clearance, he disguised or omitted details of his communist associations and had friends write glowing references.

Julius Rosenberg, who had married Greenglass' sister, Ethel, in 1939, had become an agent for the Soviet Union (USSR), working under Alexander Feklisov. In September 1944, Feklisov suggested to Rosenberg that he should consider recruiting his brother-in-law, David Greenglass, and his wife. On September 21, 1944, Feklisov reported to Moscow: "They are young, intelligent, capable, and politically developed people, strongly believing in the cause of communism and wishing to do their best to help our country as much as possible. They are undoubtedly devoted to us." David wrote to his wife, Ruth: "My darling, I most certainly will be glad to be part of the community project [espionage] that Julius and his friends [the Soviets] have in mind."

After Julius Rosenberg recommended his sister-in-law Ruth Greenglass to his NKVD superiors for the use of her apartment as a safe house for photography, the NKVD realized that David was working on the Manhattan Project. He was then recruited into Soviet espionage by Ruth at Rosenberg's behest in November 1944. Greenglass began to pass nuclear secrets to the USSR via the courier Harry Gold, and more directly with a Soviet official in New York City.

According to the Venona project intercepts decrypted by the National Security Agency between 1944 and some time in the 1970s, Greenglass and his wife Ruth were given code names. David was codenamed "KALIBR" (Cyrillic: Калибр, "calibre") and Ruth "OSA" (Cyrillic: оса, "wasp").

Greenglass turned down requests from the Los Alamos Laboratory (and Rosenberg) to work on the Operation Crossroads nuclear tests at Bikini Atoll because he wanted to be with Ruth. He was honorably discharged from the Army in February 1946. Greenglass returned to Manhattan, where, with his brother Bernie and Julius Rosenberg, he ran a small machine shop known as G & R Engineering. (Note: Greenglass's FBI file says he was honorably discharged on February 29, 1946, a date repeated by Rhodes and other sources. But 1946 was not a leap year, so there was no February 29 that year. His CIA file says February 1946.)

By 1950, Greenglass had become aware that the UK and US intelligence agencies had discovered that a Los Alamos theoretical physicist, Klaus Fuchs, had spied for the USSR during the war. Through Fuchs' confession, they found that Gold was one of Greenglass' contacts. Gold had passed Fuchs' information on to a Soviet agent, performing the role of courier, and Anatoli Yakovlev would then pass the information on to his controllers in the USSR. Through Gold, the FBI's trail led to Greenglass and the Rosenbergs. When Fuchs was captured, Julius allegedly gave the Greenglasses $5,000 to finance an escape to Mexico. Instead, they went to the Catskills and used the money to seek legal advice.

== Trial and aftermath ==
David Greenglass was arrested by the FBI for espionage in June 1950 and quickly implicated Julius Rosenberg. He explicitly denied Ethel's involvement when he testified before a grand jury in August 1950. In February 1951, weeks before the trial, he changed his testimony to claim that Ethel had typed up his notes. He testified against his sister and her husband in court in 1951 as part of an immunity agreement. In exchange for that testimony, the government allowed Ruth to stay with their two children. She was named a co-conspirator but was never indicted. Greenglass told the court, "I had a kind of hero worship there with Julius Rosenberg and I did not want my hero to fail ..."

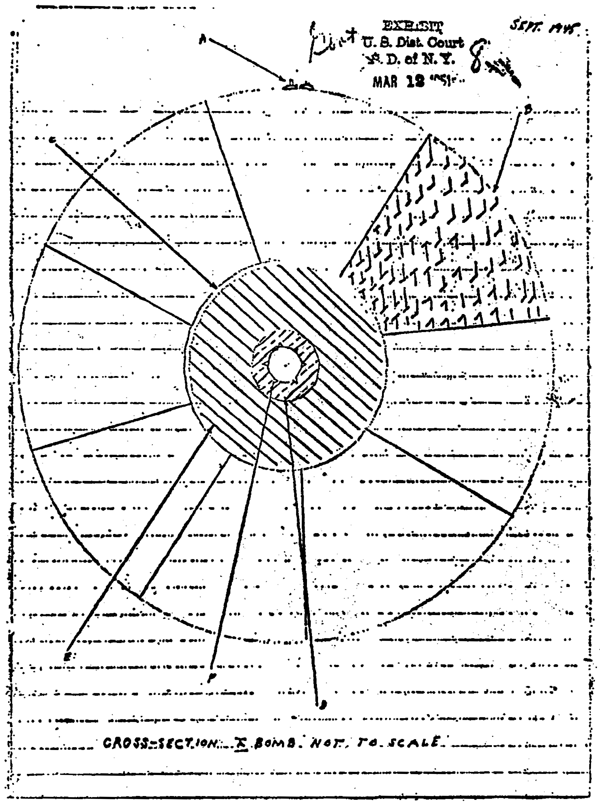
Greenglass's sketch of an implosion-type nuclear weapon, illustrating what he gave Ethel and Julius Rosenberg to pass on to the Soviet Union

During subsequent testimony in 1951, Greenglass related in detail the secrets he passed on to the Soviet Union. He falsely attributed the passing of the cross-section drawing of the atom bomb to the Soviets to Julius, and he also acknowledged having passed other sketches through Gold. He described his work on the molds into which were poured the component of the explosive lenses of the bombs used for the Trinity nuclear test and in the bombing of Nagasaki. At first this was a matter of difficulty for the prosecution, who wanted Greenglass to testify in open court about the secrets he had given—something which would by definition make them no longer "secret".

The Atomic Energy Commission decided that the implosion concept could be declassified for the trial and limited all discussion to the weapons used in World War II (fearing that Greenglass may have seen prototypes for future weapons while at Los Alamos). As a result of a surprise defense motion that all testimony about the alleged "secret of the atomic bomb" be impounded, Federal Judge Irving Kaufman at first had spectators and news reporters leave the room when Greenglass began testifying about his "secrets".

Ten minutes later, Judge Kaufman invited the news reporters back in, asking them to use their discretion in reporting on Greenglass's testimony. The Rosenbergs' defense attorney, Emanuel H. Bloch, attempted to convince the jury that his clients were concerned about issues of national security, but he failed. Greenglass' testimony, later seen to be crude and in the words of many scientists who examined it "worthless", remained sealed until 1966.

Greenglass also testified that Rosenberg had stolen and given to the Soviets a proximity fuze. Feklisov also claimed that Julius Rosenberg supplied him with a whole proximity fuze, which corroborated at least that part of Greenglass' testimony. During the trial, Bloch claimed Greenglass wanted revenge for the machine shop business failure. Bloch attempted to discredit Greenglass' character and testimony. At Greenglass' sentencing hearing, his attorney O. John Rogge repeatedly told the court his client deserved "a pat on the back" for his testimony and argued that a light sentence, no more than five years, would encourage others to follow his example. Greenglass was sentenced to 15 years in prison. He was released after nine and a half years and reunited with his wife.

In March 1953, three months before the Rosenbergs' executions, he wrote a letter for his attorney to deliver to US President Eisenhower asking for their sentences to be commuted to prison terms so that they would have an opportunity to confess. He wrote: "if these two die, I shall live the rest of my life with a very dark shadow on my conscience". He described his own testimony as "an act of contrition for the wrong I had done my country, my family and myself" and explained how he now viewed its consequences: "Here I had to take the choice of hurting someone dear to me, and I took it deliberately. I could not believe that this would be the outcome. May God in His mercy change that awful sentence." That same month he admitted he had stolen a few ounces of uranium-238 from a bomb laboratory at Los Alamos years before and had tossed it into the East River in 1950 after he first denied having stolen it.

== Later years ==
After his release in 1960, Greenglass and his family lived in New York City under an assumed name. For some years they lived on 228th Street in Laurelton, Queens, New York. In 1996, Greenglass recanted his sworn testimony in an interview with The New York Times reporter Sam Roberts and stated he had lied under oath about the extent of his sister's involvement in the spying plot in order to protect his wife. At the trial, Greenglass had testified that Ethel Rosenberg typed his notes to give to the Soviets. However, in the Roberts interview, he stated, "I frankly think my wife did the typing, but I don't remember ... My wife is more important to me than my sister. Or my mother or my father, okay? And she was the mother of my children." When Roberts asked Greenglass if he would have done anything differently, he replied, "Never."

In 2008, when a group of academic historians sought the release of the transcripts of the grand jury proceedings that indicted the Rosenbergs, Greenglass objected to the release of his testimony. U.S. District Judge Alvin Hellerstein declined to order the release of the testimony of Greenglass and other surviving witnesses who withheld their consent or could not be located. The grand jury testimony was released in July 2015. Greenglass never mentioned involvement by his sister in Rosenberg's delivery of atomic secrets to the Soviets.

Greenglass died on July 1, 2014. He was predeceased by his wife, Ruth, who had died on April 7, 2008. His death was not publicly announced by his family and was only discovered much later when a New York Times reporter called the nursing home where Greenglass had been living under an assumed name.

== Sources ==
- Andrew, Christopher M. & Mitrokhin, Vasili (1999). The Mitrokhin Archive: the KGB in Europe and the West. London: Allen Lane. ISBN 978-0-7139-9358-5.
- Radosh, Ronald & Milton, Joyce (1983). The Rosenberg File: a Search for the Truth. New York: Holt, Rinehart, and Winston. ISBN 978-0-03-049036-1.
- Rhodes, Richard (1995). Dark Sun: The Making of the Hydrogen Bomb. New York: Simon & Schuster. ISBN 978-0-684-80400-2.
