= History of the American Civil Liberties Union =

The history of the American Civil Liberties Union (ACLU) began in 1917, with the founding of the National Civil Liberties Bureau.

== Early years ==
=== CLB era ===
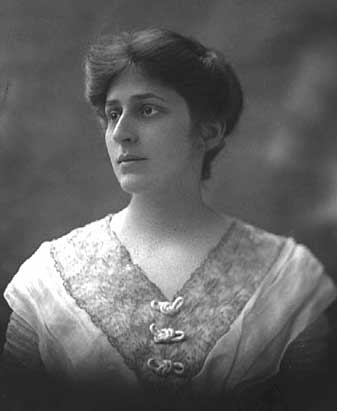
Crystal Eastman was one of the co-founders of the CLB, the predecessor to the ACLU.

The ACLU developed from the National Civil Liberties Bureau (CLB), co-founded in 1917 during World War I by Crystal Eastman, an attorney activist, and Roger Nash Baldwin. The focus of the CLB was on freedom of speech, primarily anti-war speech, and on supporting conscientious objectors who did not want to serve in World War I.

Three United States Supreme Court decisions in 1919 each upheld convictions under laws against certain anti-war speech. In 1919, the Court upheld the conviction of Socialist Party leader Charles Schenck for publishing anti-war literature. In Debs v. United States, the court upheld the conviction of Eugene Debs. While the Court upheld a conviction a third time in Abrams v. United States, Justice Oliver Wendell Holmes wrote an important dissent which has gradually been absorbed as an American principle: he urged the court to treat freedom of speech as a fundamental right, which should rarely be restricted.

In 1918, Crystal Eastman resigned from the organization due to health issues. After assuming sole leadership of the CLB, Baldwin insisted that the organization be reorganized. He wanted to change its focus from litigation to direct action and public education.

The CLB directors concurred, and on January 19, 1920, they formed an organization under a new name, the American Civil Liberties Union. Although a handful of other organizations in the United States at that time focused on civil rights, such as the National Association for the Advancement of Colored People (NAACP) and Anti-Defamation League (ADL), the ACLU was the first that did not represent a particular group of persons or a single theme. Like the CLB, the NAACP pursued litigation to work on civil rights, including efforts to overturn the disfranchisement of African Americans in the South that had taken place since the turn of the century.

During the first decades of the ACLU, Baldwin continued as its leader. His charisma and energy attracted many supporters to the ACLU board and leadership ranks. Baldwin was ascetic, wearing hand-me-down clothes, pinching pennies, and living on a minimal salary. The ACLU was directed by an executive committee and was not particularly democratic or egalitarian. New Yorkers dominated the ACLU's headquarters. Most ACLU funding came from philanthropies, such as the Garland Fund.

=== Free speech era ===
In the 1920s, government censorship was commonplace. Magazines were routinely confiscated under the anti-obscenity Comstock laws; permits for labor rallies were often denied; and virtually all anti-war or anti-government literature was outlawed. Right-wing conservatives wielded vast amounts of power, and activists that promoted unionization, socialism, or government reform were often denounced as un-American or unpatriotic. In one typical instance in 1923, author Upton Sinclair was arrested for trying to read the First Amendment during an Industrial Workers of the World rally.

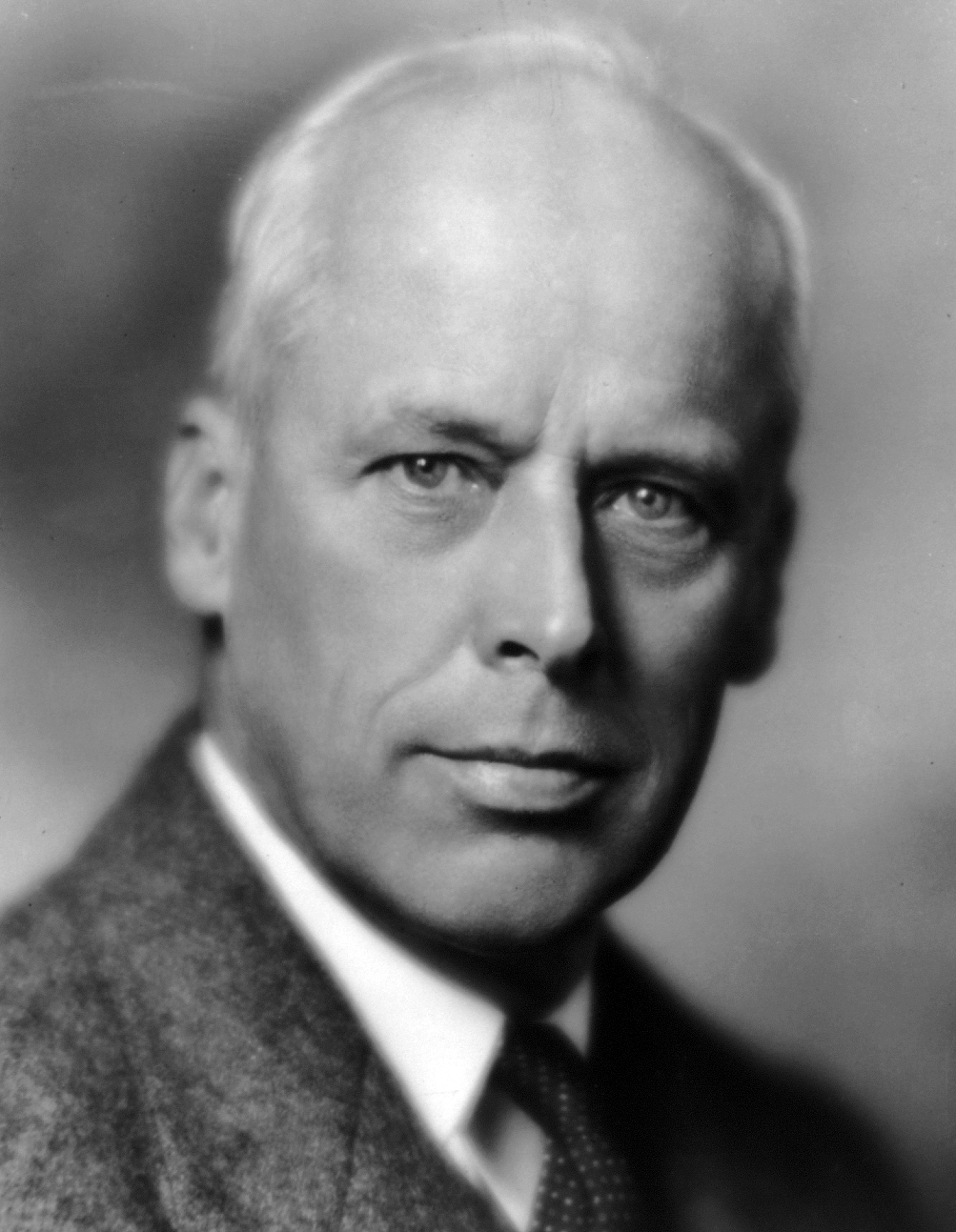
Norman Thomas was one of the early leaders of the ACLU.

ACLU leadership was divided on how to challenge civil rights violations. One faction, including Baldwin, Arthur Garfield Hays, and Norman Thomas, believed that direct, militant action was the best path. Hays was the first of many successful attorneys that relinquished their private practices to work for the ACLU. Another group, including Walter Nelles and Walter Pollak, felt that lawsuits taken to the Supreme Court were the best way to achieve change.

During the 1920s, the ACLU's primary focus was on freedom of speech in general and speech within the labor movement particularly. Because most of the ACLU's efforts were associated with the labor movement, the ACLU itself came under heavy attack from conservative groups, such as the American Legion, the National Civic Federation, and Industrial Defense Association and the Allied Patriotic Societies.

In addition to labor, the ACLU also led efforts in non-labor arenas, for example, promoting free speech in public schools. The ACLU was banned from speaking in New York public schools in 1921. The ACLU, working with the NAACP, also supported racial discrimination cases. The ACLU defended free speech regardless of espoused opinions. For example, the reactionary, anti-Catholic, anti-black Ku Klux Klan (KKK) was a frequent target of ACLU efforts, but the ACLU defended the KKK's right to hold meetings in 1923. There were some civil rights that the ACLU did not make an effort to defend in the 1920s, including censorship of the arts, government search and seizure issues, right to privacy, or wiretapping.

Government officials routinely hounded the Communist Party USA, leading it to be the primary client of the ACLU. At the same time, the Communists were very aggressive in their tactics, often engaging in illegal conduct such as denying their party membership under oath. This led to frequent conflicts between the Communists and ACLU. Communist leaders sometimes attacked the ACLU, particularly when the ACLU defended the free speech rights of conservatives, whereas Communists tried to disrupt speeches by critics of the USSR. This uneasy relationship between the two groups continued for decades.

=== Public schools ===
==== Scopes trial ====
When 1925 arrived – five years after the ACLU was formed – the organization had virtually no success to show for its efforts. That changed in 1925, when the ACLU persuaded John T. Scopes to defy Tennessee's anti-evolution law in The State of Tennessee v. John Thomas Scopes. Clarence Darrow, a member of the ACLU National Committee, headed Scopes' legal team. The prosecution, led by William Jennings Bryan, contended that the Bible should be interpreted literally in teaching creationism in school. The ACLU lost the case, and Scopes was fined $100. The Tennessee Supreme Court later upheld the law. Still, it overturned the conviction on a technicality.

The Scopes trial was a phenomenal public relations success for the ACLU. The ACLU became well known across America, and the case led to the first endorsement of the ACLU by a major US newspaper. The ACLU continued to fight for the separation of church and state in schoolrooms, decade after decade, including the 1982 case McLean v. Arkansas and the 2005 case Kitzmiller v. Dover Area School District.

Baldwin was involved in a significant free speech victory of the 1920s after he was arrested for attempting to speak at a rally of striking mill workers in New Jersey. Although the decision was limited to the state of New Jersey, the appeals court's judgment in 1928 declared that constitutional guarantees of free speech must be given "liberal and comprehensive construction", and it marked a major turning point in the civil rights movement, signaling the shift of judicial opinion in favor of civil rights.

The most important ACLU case of the 1920s was Gitlow v. New York, in which Benjamin Gitlow was arrested for violating a state law against inciting anarchy and violence when he distributed literature promoting communism. Although the Supreme Court did not overturn Gitlow's conviction, it adopted the ACLU's stance (later termed the incorporation doctrine) that the First Amendment freedom of speech applied to state laws, as well as federal laws.

==== Pierce v. Society of Sisters ====
After the First World War, many native-born Americans had a revival of concerns about the assimilation of immigrants and worries about "foreign" values. Numerous states drafted laws designed to use schools to promote a common American culture, and in 1922, the voters of Oregon passed the Oregon Compulsory Education Act. The law was primarily aimed at eliminating parochial schools, including Catholic schools. It was promoted by groups such as the Knights of Pythias, the Federation of Patriotic Societies, the Oregon Good Government League, the Orange Order, and the Ku Klux Klan.

The Oregon Compulsory Education Act required almost all children in Oregon between eight and sixteen years of age to attend public school by 1926. Associate Director Roger Nash Baldwin, a personal friend of Luke E. Hart, the then–Supreme Advocate and future Supreme Knight of the Knights of Columbus, offered to join forces with the Knights to challenge the law. The Knights of Columbus pledged an immediate $10,000 to fight the law and any additional funds necessary to defeat it.

The case became known as Pierce v. Society of Sisters, a United States Supreme Court decision that significantly expanded coverage of the Due Process Clause in the Fourteenth Amendment. In a unanimous decision, the court held that the act was unconstitutional and that parents, not the state, had the authority to educate children as they thought best. It upheld the religious freedom of parents to educate their children in religious schools.

=== Early strategy ===
Leaders of the ACLU were divided on the best tactics to use to promote civil liberties. Felix Frankfurter felt that legislation was the best long-term solution because the Supreme Court could not (and – in his opinion – should not) mandate liberal interpretations of the Bill of Rights. But Walter Pollak, Morris Ernst, and other leaders felt that Supreme Court decisions were the best path to guarantee civil liberties. A series of Supreme Court decisions in the 1920s foretold a changing national atmosphere; anti-radical emotions were diminishing, and there was a growing willingness to protect freedom of speech and assembly via court decisions.

=== Free speech expansion ===
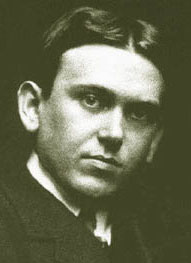
The ACLU defended H. L. Mencken when he was arrested for distributing banned literature.

Censorship was commonplace in the early 20th century. State laws and city ordinances routinely outlawed speech deemed obscene or offensive and prohibited meetings or literature promoting unions or labor organizations. Starting in 1926, the ACLU expanded its free speech activities to encompass censorship of art and literature. In that year, H. L. Mencken deliberately broke Boston law by distributing copies of his banned American Mercury magazine; the ACLU defended him and won an acquittal. The ACLU went on to win additional victories, including the landmark case United States v. One Book Called Ulysses in 1933, which reversed a ban by the Customs Department against the book Ulysses by James Joyce. The ACLU only achieved mixed results in the early years, and it was not until 1966 that the Supreme Court finally clarified the obscenity laws in the Roth v. United States and Memoirs v. Massachusetts cases.

The Comstock laws banned the distribution of sex education information based on the premise that it was obscene and led to promiscuous behavior. Mary Ware Dennett was fined $300 in 1928 for distributing a pamphlet containing sex education material. The ACLU, led by Morris Ernst, appealed her conviction and won a reversal, in which judge Learned Hand ruled that the pamphlet's primary purpose was to "promote understanding".

The success prompted the ACLU to broaden their freedom of speech efforts beyond labor and political speech to encompass movies, press, radio, and literature. The ACLU formed the National Committee on Freedom from Censorship in 1931 to coordinate this effort. By the early 1930s, censorship in the United States was diminishing.

Two major victories in the 1930s cemented the ACLU's campaign to promote free speech. In Stromberg v. California, decided in 1931, the Supreme Court sided with the ACLU and affirmed the right of a communist party member to salute a communist flag. The result was the first time the Supreme Court used the Due Process Clause of the Fourteenth amendment to subject states to the requirements of the First Amendment. In Near v. Minnesota, also decided in 1931, the Supreme Court ruled that states may not exercise prior restraint and prevent a newspaper from publishing, simply because the newspaper had a reputation for being scandalous.

== 1930s ==
The late 1930s saw the emergence of a new era of tolerance in the United States. National leaders hailed the Bill of Rights, particularly as it protected minorities, as the essence of democracy. The 1939 Supreme Court decision in Hague v. Committee for Industrial Organization affirmed the right of communists to promote their cause. Even conservative elements, such as the American Bar Association, began to campaign for civil liberties, which were long considered to be the domain of left-leaning organizations. By 1940, the ACLU had achieved many of the goals it set in the 1920s, and many of its policies were the law of the land.

=== Expansion ===
In 1929, after the Scopes and Dennett victories, Baldwin perceived that there was vast, untapped support for civil liberties in the United States. Baldwin proposed an expansion program for the ACLU, focusing on police brutality, Native American rights, African American rights, censorship in the arts, and international civil liberties. The board of directors approved Baldwin's expansion plan, except for the international efforts.

The ACLU played a significant role in passing the 1932 Norris–La Guardia Act, a federal law that prohibited employers from preventing employees from joining unions and stopped the practice of outlawing strikes, marriages, and labor organizing activities with the use of injunctions. The ACLU also played a key role in initiating a nationwide effort to reduce misconduct (such as extracting false confessions) within police departments by publishing the report Lawlessness in Law Enforcement in 1931, under the auspices of Herbert Hoover's Wickersham Commission. In 1934, the ACLU lobbied for the passage of the Indian Reorganization Act, which restored some autonomy to Native American tribes, and established penalties for kidnapping Native American children.

Although the ACLU deferred to the NAACP for litigation promoting civil liberties for African Americans, the ACLU engaged in educational efforts and published Black Justice in 1931, a report which documented institutional racism throughout the South, including lack of voting rights, segregation, and discrimination in the justice system. Funded by the Garland Fund, the ACLU also participated in producing the influential Margold Report, which outlined a strategy to fight for civil rights for blacks. The ACLU planned to demonstrate that the "separate but equal" policies governing the Southern discrimination were illegal because blacks were never, in fact, treated equally.

=== Depression era and the New Deal ===
In 1932 – twelve years after the ACLU was founded – it had achieved significant success; the Supreme Court had embraced the free speech principles espoused by the ACLU, and the general public was becoming more supportive of civil rights in general. But the Great Depression brought new assaults on civil liberties; the year 1930 saw a large increase in the number of free speech prosecutions, a doubling of the number of lynchings, and all meetings of unemployed persons were banned in Philadelphia.

The Franklin D. Roosevelt administration proposed the New Deal to combat the depression. ACLU leaders were of mixed opinions about the New Deal since many felt that it represented an increase in government intervention into personal affairs and because the National Recovery Administration suspended antitrust legislation. Roosevelt was not personally interested in civil rights but did appoint many civil libertarians to key positions, including Interior Secretary Harold Ickes, a member of the ACLU.

The economic policies of the New Deal leaders were often aligned with ACLU goals, but social goals were not. In particular, movies were subject to a barrage of local ordinances that banned screenings deemed immoral or obscene. Even public health films portraying pregnancy and birth were banned, as was Life magazine's April 11, 1938, issue, which included photos of the birth process. The ACLU fought these bans but did not prevail.

The Catholic Church attained increasing political influence in the 1930s; it used its influence to promote the censorship of movies and to discourage the publication of birth control information. This conflict between the ACLU and the Catholic Church led to the resignation of the last Catholic priest from ACLU leadership in 1934; a Catholic priest would not be represented again until the 1970s.

The ACLU took no official position on president Franklin Delano Roosevelt's 1937 court-packing plan, which threatened to increase the number of Supreme Court justices unless the Supreme Court reversed its course and began approving New Deal legislation. The Supreme Court responded by making a major shift in policy, and no longer applied strict constitutional limits to government programs, and also began to take a more active role in protecting civil liberties.

The first decision that marked the court's new direction was De Jonge v. Oregon, in which a communist labor organizer was arrested for calling a meeting to discuss unionization. The ACLU attorney Osmond Fraenkel, working with International Labor Defense, defended De Jonge in 1937 and won a major victory when the Supreme Court ruled that "peaceable assembly for lawful discussion cannot be made a crime." The De Jonge case marked the start of an era lasting for a dozen years, during which Roosevelt appointees (led by Hugo Black, William O. Douglas, and Frank Murphy) established a body of civil liberties law. In 1938, Justice Harlan F. Stone wrote the famous "footnote four" in United States v. Carolene Products Co. in which he suggested that state laws which impede civil liberties would – henceforth – require compelling justification.

Senator Robert F. Wagner proposed the National Labor Relations Act in 1935, which empowered workers to unionize. Ironically, after 15 years of fighting for workers' rights, the ACLU initially opposed the act (it later took no stand on the legislation) because some ACLU leaders feared the increased power the bill gave to the government. The newly formed National Labor Relations Board (NLRB) posed a dilemma for the ACLU because, in 1937, it issued an order to Henry Ford, prohibiting Ford from disseminating anti-union literature. Part of the ACLU leadership habitually took the side of labor, and that faction supported the NLRB's action. But part of the ACLU supported Ford's right to free speech. ACLU leader Arthur Garfield Hays proposed a compromise (supporting the auto workers union, yet also endorsing Ford's right to express personal opinions), but the schism highlighted a deeper divide that would become more prominent in the years to come.

The ACLU's support of the NLRB was a significant development for the ACLU because it marked the first time it accepted that a government agency could be responsible for upholding civil liberties. Until 1937, the ACLU felt that citizens and private organizations best upheld civil rights.

Some factions in the ACLU proposed new directions for the organization. In the late 1930s, some local affiliates proposed shifting their emphasis from civil liberties appellate actions to becoming a legal aid society centered on store front offices in low-income neighborhoods. The ACLU directors rejected that proposal. Other ACLU members wanted the ACLU to shift focus into the political arena and be more willing to compromise their ideals to strike deals with politicians. The ACLU leadership also rejected this initiative.

=== Jehovah's Witnesses ===
The ACLU's support of defendants with unpopular, sometimes extreme, viewpoints has produced many landmark court cases and established new civil liberties. One such defendant was the Jehovah's Witnesses, who were involved in a large number of Supreme Court cases. Cases that the ACLU supported included Lovell v. City of Griffin (which struck down a city ordinance that required a permit before a person could distribute "literature of any kind"); Martin v. Struthers (which struck down an ordinance prohibiting door-to-door canvassing); and Cantwell v. Connecticut (which reversed the conviction of a Witness who was reciting offensive speech on a street corner).

The most important cases involved statutes requiring flag salutes. The Jehovah's Witnesses felt that saluting a flag was contrary to their religious beliefs. Two children were convicted in 1938 of not saluting the flag. The ACLU supported their appeal to the Supreme Court, but the court affirmed the conviction in 1940. But three years later, in West Virginia State Board of Education v. Barnette, the Supreme court reversed itself and wrote, "If there is any fixed star in our constitutional constellation, it is that no official, high or petty, can prescribe what shall be orthodox in politics, nationalism, religion, or other matters of opinion or force citizens to confess by word or act their faith therein." To underscore its decision, the Supreme Court announced it on Flag Day.

=== Communism and totalitarianism ===
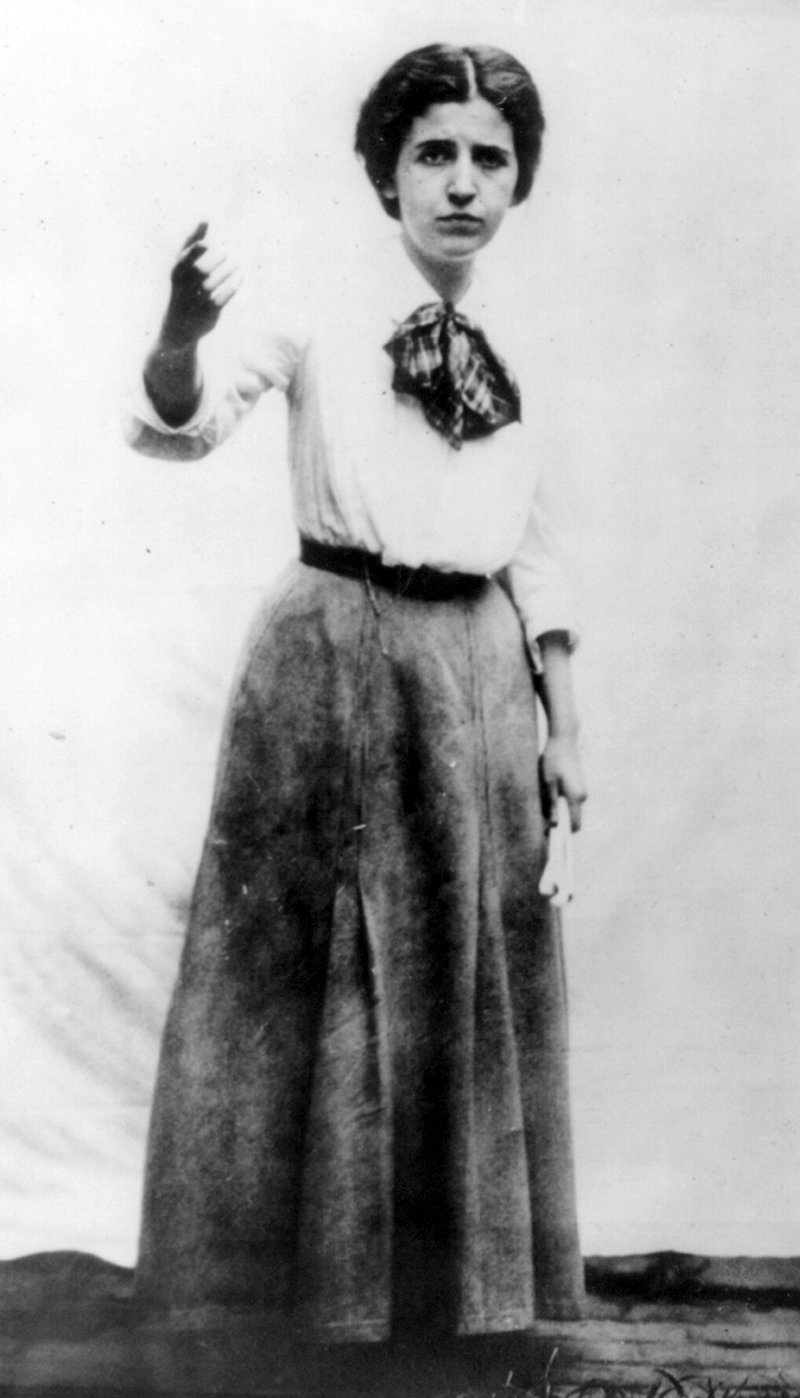
Elizabeth Gurley Flynn was voted off the ACLU board in 1940 because of her Communist Party membership but reinstated posthumously in 1970.

The rise of totalitarian regimes in Germany, Russia, and other countries that rejected freedom of speech and association greatly impacted the civil liberties movement in the US; anti-Communist sentiment rose, and civil liberties were curtailed.

The ACLU leadership was divided over whether or not to defend pro-Nazi speech in the United States; pro-labor elements within the ACLU were hostile towards Nazism and fascism and objected when the ACLU defended Nazis. Several states passed laws outlawing hate speech directed at ethnic groups. The first person arrested under New Jersey's 1935 hate speech law was a Jehovah's Witness who was charged with disseminating anti-Catholic literature. The ACLU defended the Jehovah's Witnesses, and the charges were dropped. The ACLU defended numerous pro-Nazi groups, defending their rights to free speech and free association.

In the late 1930s, the ACLU allied itself with the Popular Front, a coalition of liberal organizations coordinated by the United States Communist Party. The ACLU benefited because affiliates from the Popular Front could often fight local civil rights battles much more effectively than the New York-based ACLU. The association with the Communist Party led to accusations that the ACLU was a "Communist front", particularly because Harry F. Ward was both chairman of the ACLU and chairman of the American League Against War and Fascism, a Communist organization.

The House Un-American Activities Committee (HUAC) was created in 1938 to uncover sedition and treason within the United States. When witnesses testified at its hearings, the ACLU was mentioned several times, leading the HUAC to mention the ACLU prominently in its 1939 report. This damaged the ACLU's reputation severely, even though the report said that it could not "definitely state whether or not" the ACLU was a Communist organization.

While the ACLU rushed to defend its image against allegations of being a Communist front, it also protected witnesses harassed by the HUAC. The ACLU was one of the few organizations to protest (unsuccessfully) against the passage of the Smith Act in 1940, which would later be used to imprison many persons who supported Communism. The ACLU defended many persons who were prosecuted under the Smith Act, including labor leader Harry Bridges.

ACLU leadership was split on whether to purge its leadership of Communists. Norman Thomas, John Haynes Holmes, and Morris Ernst were anti-Communists who wanted to distance the ACLU from Communism; opposing them were Harry F. Ward, Corliss Lamont, and Elizabeth Gurley Flynn, who rejected any political test for ACLU leadership. A bitter struggle ensued throughout 1939, and the anti-Communists prevailed in February 1940 when the board voted to prohibit anyone who supported totalitarianism from ACLU leadership roles. Ward immediately resigned, and – following a contentious six-hour debate – Flynn was voted off the ACLU's board. The 1940 resolution was considered by many to be a betrayal of its fundamental principles. The resolution was rescinded in 1968, and Flynn was posthumously reinstated to the ACLU in 1970.

== Mid-century ==
=== World War II ===
Prior to U.S. entry into World War II, more Americans than ever viewed the Bill of Rights as a hallowed document, and numerous organizations promoted the principle of civil liberties. Chicago and New York proclaimed "Civil Rights" weeks, and President Franklin Delano Roosevelt announced a national Bill of Rights day. Eleanor Roosevelt was the keynote speaker at the 1939 ACLU convention.

The ACLU had a decidedly mixed civil liberties record during World War II. While there were far fewer sedition prosecutions than in World War I, this did not mean that President Roosevelt was more tolerant of dissent than Wilson had been. The primary explanation was that prosecutors, working under similar laws, had fewer plausible targets because almost everyone rallied to the war effort after the attack on Pearl Harbor.

Despite this, Roosevelt put constant pressure on Attorney General Francis Biddle to take legal action against his prominent pre-war critics including the so-called "Patterson-McCormick Axis" of Robert McCormick, the publisher of the Chicago Daily Tribune, Joseph Medill Patterson, the publisher of the New York Daily News, and his sister Cissy Patterson, the publisher of the Washington Times-Herald.

Partly to appease the president, Biddle finally charged thirty much lesser-known individuals for violating the Smith Act. Although many of the defendants did not know each other, and most lived in scattered locations in the U.S., they were all tried at once in Washington, D.C. in the Sedition Trial of 1944 Despite efforts by Roger N. Baldwin, Norman Thomas, Thurgood Marshall, and others in the leadership to get the ACLU to go on record condemning the trial (Baldwin called it "monstrous,") the board of directors overruled them.

The ACLU also had a mixed record on fighting wartime restrictions on the press. It was silent when the U.S. Post Office revoked the second class mailing privileges of Social Justice, the magazine of Father Charles E. Coughlin. On the other hand, it extended legal aid to the publishers of The Militant of the Socialist Workers Party and the Boise Valley Herald when their mailing rights were revoked. The ACLU was unable to prevent extensive extralegal harassment of the black press by the FBI and other agencies. The ACLU's shortcomings in defending civil liberties inspired the contemporary saying "born in World War I and died in World War II."

==== Japanese American internment ====
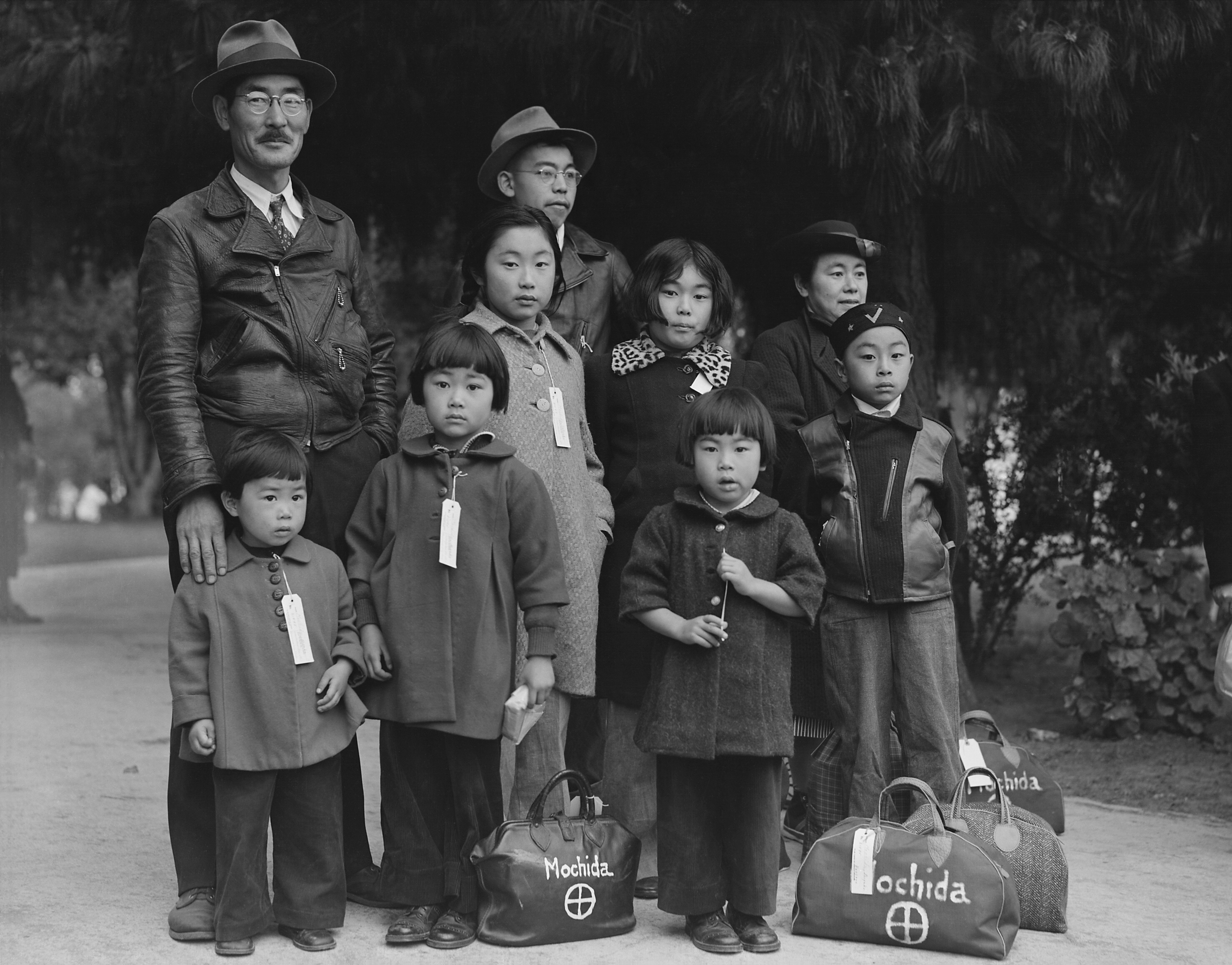
The ACLU was internally divided when it came to defending the rights of Japanese Americans who had been forcibly relocated to internment camps.

Two months after the Japanese attack on Pearl Harbor, Roosevelt authorized the creation of military "exclusion zones" with Executive Order 9066, paving the way for the detention of all West Coast Japanese Americans in inland camps. In addition to the non-citizen Issei (prohibited from naturalization as members of an "unassimilable" race), over two-thirds of those swept up were American-born citizens.

Baldwin criticized Roosevelt's plan but then qualified his comments by saying that Executive Order 9066 was "undoubtedly legal in principle." The Board of Directors settled into a long debate. It was divided between Roosevelt loyalists, such as Morris Ernst and Corliss Lamont, who did not want to challenge the administration, and more absolutist civil libertarians such as Baldwin, Thurgood Marshall, and Norman Thomas.

The ACLU itself only sent a letter of protest to the president on March 20, 1942, more than a month after Executive Order 9066. Signed by Baldwin, it called on the administration to allow Japanese Americans to prove their loyalty at individual hearings but not challenge the constitutionality of the order.

The suggestion for a loyalty hearings option went nowhere, and opinions within the organization became increasingly divided as the Army began the "evacuation" of the West Coast. In May, the two factions, one pushing to fight the exclusion orders then being issued, the other advocating support for the President's policy of removing citizens whose "presence may endanger national security", brought their opposing resolutions to a vote before the board and the ACLU's national leaders. They decided not to challenge the eviction of Japanese American citizens; on June 22, instructions were sent to West Coast branches not to support cases that argued the government had no constitutional right to do so.

The ACLU offices on the West Coast had been more directly involved in addressing the tide of anti-Japanese prejudice from the start, as they were geographically closer to the issue and were already working on cases challenging the exclusion by this time. The Seattle office, assisting in Gordon Hirabayashi's lawsuit, created an unaffiliated committee to continue the work the ACLU had started, while in Los Angeles, attorney A.L. Wirin continued to represent Ernest Kinzo Wakayama but without addressing the case's constitutional questions. Wirin would lose private clients because of his defense of Wakayama and other Japanese Americans; however, the San Francisco branch, led by Ernest Besig, refused to discontinue its support for Fred Korematsu, whose case had been taken on before the June 22 directive, and attorney Wayne Collins, with Besig's full support, centered his defense on the illegality of Korematsu's exclusion.

The West Coast offices had wanted a test case to take to court. However, they had a difficult time finding a Japanese American who was both willing to violate the internment orders and able to meet the ACLU's desired criteria of a sympathetic, Americanized plaintiff. Of the 120,000 Japanese Americans affected by the order, only 12 disobeyed, and Korematsu, Hirabayashi, and two others were the only resisters whose cases eventually made it to the Supreme Court. Hirabayashi v. United States came before the Court in May 1943, and the justices upheld the government's right to exclude Japanese Americans from the West Coast; although it had earlier forced its local office in L.A. to stop aiding Hirabayashi, the ACLU donated $1,000 to the case (over a third of the legal team's total budget) and submitted an amicus brief. Besig, dissatisfied with Osmond Fraenkel's tamer defense, filed an additional amicus brief that directly addressed Hirabayashi's constitutional rights. In the meantime, A.L. Wirin served as one of the attorneys in Yasui v. United States (decided the same day as the Hirabayashi case and with the same results). Still, he kept his arguments within the national office's parameters. The only case to receive a favorable ruling, ex parte Endo, was also aided by two amicus briefs from the ACLU, one from the more conservative Fraenkel and another from the more putative Wayne Collins.

Korematsu v. United States proved to be the most controversial of these cases, as Besig and Collins refused to bow to the national ACLU office's pressure to pursue the case without challenging the government's right to remove citizens from their homes. The ACLU board threatened to revoke the San Francisco branch's national affiliation. At the same time, Baldwin tried unsuccessfully to convince Collins to step down so he could replace him as lead attorney in the case. Eventually, Collins agreed to present the case alongside Charles Horsky; however, their arguments before the Supreme Court remained based on the unconstitutionality of the exclusion order Korematsu had disobeyed. The case was decided in December 1944, when the Court once again upheld the government's right to relocate Japanese Americans, although Korematsu's, Hirabayashi's and Yasui's convictions were later overturned in coram nobis proceedings in the 1980s. Legal scholar Peter Irons later asserted that the national office of the ACLU's decision not to challenge the constitutionality of Executive Order 9066 directly had "crippled the effective presentation of these appeals to the Supreme Court".

The national office of the ACLU was even more reluctant to defend anti-war protesters. A majority of the board passed a resolution in 1942 that declared the ACLU unwilling to defend anyone who interfered with the United States' war effort. Included in this group were the thousands of Nisei who renounced their US citizenship during the war but later regretted the decision and tried to revoke their applications for "repatriation". (A significant number of those slated to "go back" to Japan had never actually been to the country and were being deported rather than repatriated.) Ernest Besig had in 1944 visited the Tule Lake Segregation Center, where the majority of these "renunciants" were concentrated, and subsequently enlisted Wayne Collins' help to file a lawsuit on their behalf, arguing the renunciations had been given under duress. The national organization prohibited local branches from representing the renunciants, forcing Collins to pursue the case independently, although Besig and the Northern California office provided some support.

During his 1944 visit to Tule Lake, Besig had also become aware of a hastily constructed stockade in which Japanese American internees were routinely being brutalized and held for months without due process. The national ACLU office forbade Besig to intervene on behalf of the stockade prisoners or even to visit the Tule Lake camp without prior written approval from Baldwin. Unable to help directly, Besig turned to Wayne Collins for assistance. Using the threat of habeas corpus suits, Collins managed to have the stockade closed down. A year later, after learning that the stockade had been reestablished, he returned to the camp and had it closed down for good.

==== End of WWII in 1945 ====
When the war ended in 1945, the ACLU was 25 years old and had accumulated impressive legal victories. President Harry S. Truman sent a congratulatory telegram to the ACLU on the occasion of their 25th anniversary. American attitudes had changed since World War I, and dissent by minorities was tolerated with more willingness. The Bill of Rights was more respected, and minority rights were becoming more commonly championed. During their 1945 annual conference, the ACLU leaders composed a list of important civil rights issues to focus on in the future, including racial discrimination and separation of church and state.

The ACLU supported the African-American defendants in Shelley v. Kraemer, when they tried to occupy a house they had purchased in a neighborhood with racially restrictive housing covenants. The African-American purchasers won the case in 1945.

=== Cold War era ===
Anti-Communist sentiment gripped the United States during the Cold War beginning in 1946. Federal investigations caused many persons with Communist or left-leaning affiliations to lose jobs, become blocklisted, or be jailed. During the Cold War, although the United States collectively ignored the civil rights of Communists, other civil liberties – such as due process in law and separation of church and state – continued to be reinforced and even expanded.

The ACLU was internally divided when it purged Communists from its leadership in 1940, and that ambivalence continued as it decided whether to defend alleged Communists during the late 1940s. Some ACLU leaders were anti-Communist and felt that the ACLU should not defend any victims. Some ACLU leaders felt that Communists were entitled to free speech protections and that the ACLU should defend them. Other ACLU leaders were uncertain about the threat posed by Communists and tried to establish a compromise between the two extremes. This ambivalent state of affairs would last until 1954, when the civil liberties faction prevailed, leading to most anti-Communist leaders' resignations.

In 1947, President Truman issued Executive Order 9835, which created the Federal Loyalty Program. This program authorized the Attorney General to create a list of organizations that were deemed to be subversive. Any association with these programs was ground for barring the person from employment. Listed organizations were not notified that they were being considered for the list, nor did they have an opportunity to present counterarguments; nor did the government divulge any factual basis for inclusion in the list. Although ACLU leadership was divided on whether to challenge the Federal Loyalty Program, some challenges were successfully made.

Also in 1947, the House Un-American Activities Committee (HUAC) subpoenaed ten Hollywood directors and writers, the Hollywood Ten, intending to ask them to identify Communists, but the witnesses refused to testify. All were imprisoned for contempt of Congress. The ACLU supported several artists' appeals but lost on appeal. The Hollywood establishment panicked after the HUAC hearings and created a blacklist that prohibited anyone with leftist associations from working. The ACLU supported legal challenges to the blocklist, but those challenges failed. The ACLU was more successful with an education effort; the 1952 report The Judges and the Judged, prepared at the ACLU's direction in response to the blocklisting of actress Jean Muir, described the unfair and unethical actions behind the blocklisting process, and it helped gradually turn public opinion against McCarthyism.

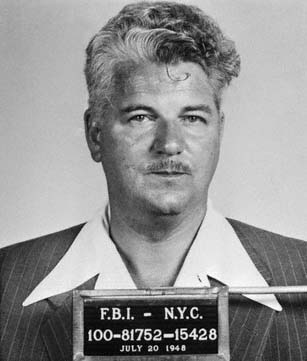
The ACLU chose not to support Eugene Dennis or other leaders of the US Communist Party, and they were all imprisoned, along with their attorneys.

The federal government took direct aim at the US Communist Party in 1948 when it indicted its top twelve leaders in the Foley Square trial. The case hinged on whether or not mere membership in a totalitarian political party was sufficient to conclude that members advocated the overthrow of the United States government. The ACLU chose not to represent any of the defendants, and they were all found guilty and sentenced to three to five years in prison. Their defense attorneys were all cited for contempt, went to prison, and were disbarred. When the government indicted additional party members, the defendants could not find attorneys to represent them. Communists protested outside the courthouse; a bill to outlaw picketing of courthouses was introduced in Congress, and the ACLU supported the anti-picketing law.

In a change of heart, the ACLU supported the party leaders during their appeal process. The Supreme Court upheld the convictions in the Dennis v. United States decision by softening the free speech requirements from a "clear and present danger" test to a "grave and probable" test. The ACLU issued a public condemnation of the Dennis decision, and resolved to fight it. One reason for the Supreme Court's support of Cold War legislation was the 1949 deaths of Supreme Court justices Frank Murphy and Wiley Rutledge, leaving Hugo Black and William O. Douglas as the only remaining civil libertarians on the Court.

The Dennis decision paved the way for the prosecution of hundreds of other Communist party members. The ACLU supported many Communists during their appeals (although most of the initiative originated with local ACLU affiliates, not the national headquarters), but most convictions were upheld. The two California affiliates, in particular, felt the national ACLU headquarters was not supporting civil liberties strongly enough, and they initiated more cold war cases than the national headquarters did.

The ACLU challenged many loyalty oath requirements across the country, but the courts upheld most loyalty oath laws. California ACLU affiliates successfully challenged the California state loyalty oath. The Supreme Court, until 1957, upheld nearly every law which restricted the liberties of Communists.

The ACLU, even though it scaled back its defense of Communists during the Cold War, still came under heavy criticism as a "front" for Communism. Critics included the American Legion, Senator Joseph McCarthy, the HUAC, and the FBI. Several ACLU leaders were sympathetic to the FBI, and as a consequence, the ACLU rarely investigated any of the many complaints alleging abuse of power by the FBI during the Cold War.

In 1950, Raymond L. Wise, ACLU board member 1933–1951, defended William Perl, one of the other spies embroiled in the atomic espionage cases (made famous by the execution of Julius Rosenberg and Ethel Rosenberg). However, the ACLU publicly endorsed the guilty verdict in the Rosenberg case. The ACLU took the position that the execution of the Rosenbergs did not involve a civil rights issue.

=== Organizational change ===
In 1950, the ACLU board of directors asked executive director Baldwin to resign, feeling he lacked the organizational skills to lead the 9,000 (and growing) member organization. Baldwin objected, but a majority of the board elected to remove him from the position, and he was replaced by Patrick Murphy Malin. Under Malin's guidance, membership tripled to 30,000 by 1955 – the start of 24 years of continual growth leading to 275,000 members in 1974. Malin also presided over an expansion of local ACLU affiliates.

The ACLU, controlled by an elite of a few dozen New Yorkers, became more democratic in the 1950s. In 1951, the ACLU amended its bylaws to permit the local affiliates to participate directly in voting on ACLU policy decisions. A bi-annual conference, open to the entire membership, was instituted in the same year; in later decades, it became a pulpit for activist members, who suggested new directions for the ACLU, including abortion rights, death penalty, and rights of the poor.

=== McCarthy era ===
In the 1950s, the ACLU chose not to support Paul Robeson and other leftist defendants, a decision that would be heavily criticized in the future.

During the early 1950s, the ACLU continued to steer a moderate course through the Cold War. When singer Paul Robeson was denied a passport in 1950, even though he was not accused of any illegal acts, the ACLU chose not to defend him. The ACLU later reversed their stance and supported William Worthy and Rockwell Kent in their passport confiscation cases, which resulted in legal victories in the late 1950s.

In response to communist witch-hunts, many witnesses and employees chose to use the Fifth Amendment protection against self-incrimination to avoid divulging information about their political beliefs. Government agencies and private organizations, in response, established policies which inferred communist party membership for anyone who invoked the fifth amendment. The national ACLU was divided on whether to defend employees who had been fired merely for pleading the fifth amendment, but the New York affiliate successfully assisted teacher Harry Slochower in his Supreme Court case, which reversed his termination.

The fifth amendment issue became the catalyst for a watershed event in 1954, which finally resolved the ACLU's ambivalence by ousting the anti-communists from ACLU leadership. In 1953, the anti-communists, led by Norman Thomas and James Fly, proposed a set of resolutions that inferred guilt of persons that invoked the Fifth Amendment. These resolutions were the first that fell under the ACLU's new organizational rules permitting local affiliates to participate in the vote; the affiliates outvoted the national headquarters and rejected the anti-communist resolutions. Anti-communist leaders refused to accept the results of the vote and brought the issue up for discussion again at the 1954 bi-annual convention. ACLU member Frank Graham, president of the University of North Carolina, attacked the anti-communists with a counter-proposal, which stated that the ACLU "stand[s] against guilt by association, judgment by accusation, the invasion of privacy of personal opinions and beliefs, and the confusion of dissent with disloyalty". The anti-communists continued to battle Graham's proposal but were outnumbered by the affiliates. The anti-communists finally gave up and departed the board of directors in late 1954 and 1955, ending an eight-year ambivalence within the ACLU leadership ranks. After that, the ACLU proceeded with firmer resolve against Cold War anti-communist legislation. The period from the 1940 resolution (and the purge of Elizabeth Flynn) to the 1954 resignation of the anti-communist leaders is considered by many to be an era in which the ACLU abandoned its core principles.

McCarthyism declined in late 1954 after television journalist Edward R. Murrow and others publicly chastised McCarthy. The controversies over the Bill of Rights that the Cold War generated ushered in a new era in American Civil liberties. In 1954, in Brown v. Board of Education, the Supreme Court unanimously overturned state-sanctioned school segregation, and after that, a flood of civil rights victories dominated the legal landscape.

The Supreme Court handed the ACLU two key victories in 1957, in Watkins v. United States and Yates v. United States, both of which undermined the Smith Act and marked the beginning of the end of communist party membership inquiries. In 1965, the Supreme Court produced some decisions, including Lamont v. Postmaster General (in which the plaintiff was Corliss Lamont, a former ACLU board member), which upheld fifth amendment protections and brought an end to restrictions on political activity.

== 1960s ==
The decade from 1954 to 1964 was the most successful period in the ACLU's history. Membership rose from 30,000 to 80,000, and by 1965 it had affiliates in seventeen states. During the ACLU's bi-annual conference in Colorado in 1964, the Supreme Court issued rulings on eight cases involving the ACLU; the ACLU prevailed on seven of the eight. The ACLU played a role in Supreme Court decisions reducing censorship of literature and arts, protecting freedom of association, prohibiting racial segregation, excluding religion from public schools, and providing due process protection to criminal suspects. The ACLU's success arose from changing public attitudes; the American populace was more educated, tolerant, and willing to accept unorthodox behavior.

=== Separation of church and state ===
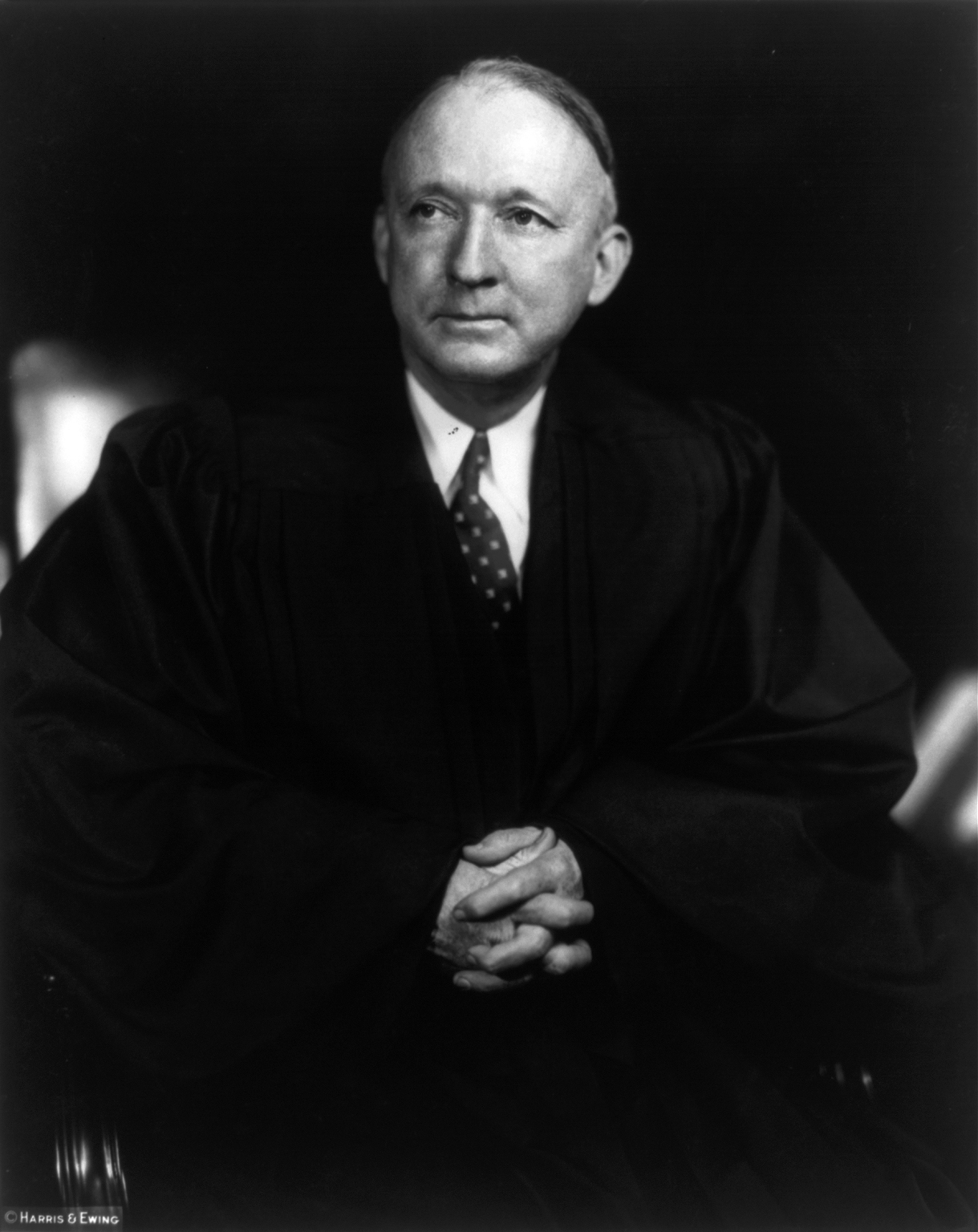
Supreme Court justice Hugo Black often endorsed the ACLU's position on the separation of church and state.

Legal battles concerning the separation of church and state originated in laws dating to 1938, which required religious instruction in school or provided state funding for religious schools. The Catholic church was a leading proponent of such laws, and the primary opponents (the "separationists") were the ACLU, Americans United for Separation of Church and State, and the American Jewish Congress. The ACLU led the challenge in the 1947 Everson v. Board of Education case, in which Justice Hugo Black wrote "[t]he First Amendment has erected a wall between church and state.... That wall must be kept high and impregnable." It was not clear that the Bill of Rights forbid state governments from supporting religious education, and strong legal arguments were made by religious proponents, arguing that the Supreme Court should not act as a "national school board", and that the Constitution did not govern social issues. However, the ACLU and other advocates of church/state separation persuaded the Court to declare such activities unconstitutional. Historian Samuel Walker writes that the ACLU's "greatest impact on American life" was its role in persuading the Supreme Court to "constitutionalize" so many public controversies.

In 1948, the ACLU prevailed in the McCollum v. Board of Education case, which challenged public school religious classes taught by clergy paid for by private funds. The ACLU also won cases challenging schools in New Mexico that were taught by clergy and had crucifixes hanging in the classrooms. In the 1960s, the ACLU, in response to member insistence, turned its attention to the in-class promotion of religion. In 1960, 42 percent of American schools included Bible reading. In 1962, the ACLU published a policy statement condemning in-school prayers, observation of religious holidays, and Bible reading. The Supreme Court concurred with the ACLU's position when it prohibited New York's in-school prayers in the 1962 Engel v. Vitale decision. Religious factions across the country rebelled against the anti-prayer decisions, leading them to propose the School Prayer Constitutional Amendment, which declared in-school prayer legal. The ACLU participated in a lobbying effort against the amendment, and the 1966 congressional vote failed to obtain the required two-thirds majority.

However, not all cases were victories; ACLU lost cases in 1949 and 1961 which challenged state laws requiring commercial businesses to close on Sunday, the Christian Sabbath. The Supreme Court has never overturned such laws, although some states subsequently revoked many of the laws under pressure from commercial interests.

=== Freedom of expression ===
During the 1940s and 1950s, the ACLU continued its battle against censorship of art and literature. In 1948, the New York affiliate of the ACLU received mixed results from the Supreme Court, winning the appeal of Carl Jacob Kunz, who was convicted for speaking without a police permit, but losing the appeal of Irving Feiner who was arrested to prevent a breach of the peace, based on his oration denouncing President Truman and the American Legion. The ACLU lost the case of Joseph Beauharnais, who was arrested for group libel when he distributed literature impugning the character of African Americans.

Cities across America routinely banned movies because they were deemed to be "harmful", "offensive", or "immoral" – censorship which was validated by the 1915 Mutual v. Ohio Supreme Court decision which held movies to be mere commerce, undeserving of first amendment protection. The film The Miracle was banned in New York in 1951 at the behest of the Catholic Church, but the ACLU supported the film's distributor in an appeal of the ban, and won a major victory in the 1952 decision Joseph Burstyn, Inc. v. Wilson. The Catholic Church led efforts throughout the 1950s attempting to persuade local prosecutors to ban various books and movies, leading to conflict with the ACLU when the ACLU published it statement condemning the church's tactics. Further legal actions by the ACLU successfully defended films such as M and la Ronde, leading the eventual dismantling of movie censorship. Hollywood continued employing self-censorship with its own Production Code, but in 1956 the ACLU called on Hollywood to abolish the Code.

The ACLU defended Beat Generation artists, including Allen Ginsberg who was prosecuted for his poem "Howl"; and – in an unorthodox case – the ACLU helped a coffee house regain its restaurant license which was revoked because its Beat customers were allegedly disturbing the peace of the neighborhood.

The ACLU lost an important press censorship case when, in 1957, the Supreme Court upheld the obscenity conviction of publisher Samuel Roth for distributing adult magazines. As late as 1953, books such as Tropic of Cancer and From Here to Eternity were still banned. But public standards rapidly became more liberal through the 1960s, and obscenity was notoriously difficult to define, so by 1971, obscenity prosecutions had halted.

=== Racial discrimination ===
A major aspect of civil liberties progress after World War II was the undoing centuries of racism in federal, state, and local governments – an effort generally associated with the civil rights movement. Several civil liberties organizations worked together for progress, including the National Association for the Advancement of Colored People (NAACP), the ACLU, and the American Jewish Congress. The NAACP took primary responsibility for Supreme Court cases (often led by lead NAACP attorney Thurgood Marshall), with the ACLU focusing on police misconduct, and supporting the NAACP with amicus briefs. The NAACP achieved a key victory in 1950 with the Henderson v. United States decision that ended segregation in interstate bus and rail transportation.

In 1954, the ACLU filed an amicus brief in the case of Brown v. Board of Education, which led to the ban on racial segregation in US public schools. Southern states instituted a McCarthyism-style witch-hunt against the NAACP, attempting to force it to disclose membership lists. The ACLU's fight against racism was not limited to segregation; in 1964, the ACLU provided key support to plaintiffs, primarily lower-income urban residents, in Reynolds v. Sims, which required states to establish the voting districts following the "one person, one vote" principle.

=== Police misconduct ===
The ACLU regularly tackled police misconduct issues, starting with the 1932 case Powell v. Alabama (right to an attorney), and including 1942's Betts v. Brady (right to an attorney), and 1951's Rochin v. California (involuntary stomach pumping). In the late 1940s, several ACLU local affiliates established permanent committees to address policing issues. During the 1950s and 1960s, the ACLU was responsible for substantially advancing the legal protections against police misconduct. In 1958, the Philadelphia affiliate was responsible for causing the City of Philadelphia to create the nation's first civilian police review board. In 1959, the Illinois affiliate published the first report in the nation, Secret Detention by the Chicago Police which documented unlawful detention by police.

Some of the most notable ACLU successes came in the 1960s when the ACLU prevailed in a string of cases limiting the power of police to gather evidence; in 1961's Mapp v. Ohio, the Supreme court required states to obtain a warrant before searching a person's home. The Gideon v. Wainwright decision in 1963 provided legal representation to indigents. In 1964, the ACLU persuaded the Court, in Escobedo v. Illinois, to permit suspects to have an attorney present during questioning. And, in 1966, Miranda v. Arizona federal decision required police to notify suspects of their constitutional rights, which was later extended to juveniles in the following year's in re Gault (1967) federal ruling. Although many law enforcement officials criticized the ACLU for expanding the rights of suspects, police officers also used the services of the ACLU. For example, when the ACLU represented New York City policemen in their lawsuit, which objected to searches of their workplace lockers. In the late 1960s, civilian review boards in New York City and Philadelphia were abolished, over the ACLU's objection.

=== Civil liberties revolution of the 1960s ===
The 1960s was a tumultuous era in the United States, and public interest in civil liberties underwent explosive growth. Civil liberties actions in the 1960s were often led by young people and often employed tactics such as sit ins and marches. Protests were often peaceful but sometimes employed militant tactics. The ACLU played a central role in all major civil liberties debates of the 1960s, including new fields such as gay rights, prisoner's rights, abortion, rights of the poor, and the death penalty. Membership in the ACLU increased from 52,000 at the beginning of the decade to 104,000 in 1970. In 1960, there were affiliates in seven states, and by 1974 there were affiliates in 46 states. During the 1960s, the ACLU underwent a major transformation in tactics; it shifted emphasis from legal appeals (generally involving amicus briefs submitted to the Supreme Court) to direct representation of defendants when they were initially arrested. At the same time, the ACLU transformed its style from "disengaged and elitist" to "emotionally engaged". The ACLU published a breakthrough document in 1963, titled How Americans Protest, which was borne of frustration with the slow progress in battling racism, and which endorsed aggressive, even militant protest techniques.

African-American protests in the South accelerated in the early 1960s, and the ACLU assisted at every step. After four African-American college students staged a sit-in in a segregated North Carolina department store, the sit-in movement gained momentum across the United States. During 1960–61, the ACLU defended black students arrested for demonstrating in North Carolina, Florida, and Louisiana. The ACLU also provided legal help for the Freedom Rides in 1961, the integration of the University of Mississippi, the Birmingham campaign in 1963, and the 1964 Freedom Summer.

The NAACP was responsible for managing most sit-in related cases that made it to the Supreme Court, winning nearly every decision. But it fell to the ACLU and other legal volunteer efforts to provide legal representation to hundreds of protestors – white and black – who were arrested while protesting in the South. The ACLU joined with other civil liberties groups to form the Lawyers Constitutional Defense Committee (LCDC), which provided legal representation to many protesters. The ACLU provided the majority of the funding for the LCDC.

In 1964, the ACLU opened up a major office in Atlanta, Georgia, dedicated to serving Southern issues. Much of the ACLU's progress in the South was due to Charles Morgan Jr., the charismatic leader of the Atlanta office. Morgan was responsible for desegregating juries (Whitus v. Georgia), desegregating prisons (Lee v. Washington), and reforming election laws. In 1966, the southern office successfully represented African-American congressman Julian Bond in Bond v. Floyd, after the Georgia House of Representatives refused to admit Bond into the legislature on the basis that he was an admitted pacifist opposed to the ongoing Vietnam War. Another widely publicized case defended by Morgan was that of Army doctor Howard Levy, who was convicted of refusing to train Green Berets. Despite raising the defense that the Green Berets were committing war crimes in Vietnam, Levy lost on appeal in Parker v. Levy, 417 US 733 (1974).

In 1969, the ACLU won a significant victory for free speech when it defended Dick Gregory after he was arrested for peacefully protesting against the mayor of Chicago. The court ruled in Gregory v. Chicago that a speaker cannot be arrested for disturbing the peace when hostility is initiated by someone in the audience, as that would amount to a "heckler's veto".

=== Vietnam War ===
The ACLU was at the center of several legal aspects of the Vietnam war: defending draft resisters, challenging the constitutionality of the war, the potential impeachment of Richard Nixon, and the use of national security concerns to preemptively censor newspapers.

David J. Miller was the first person prosecuted for burning his draft card. The New York affiliate of the ACLU appealed his 1965 conviction (367 F.2d 72: United States of America v. David J. Miller, 1966), but the Supreme Court refused to hear the appeal. Two years later, the Massachusetts affiliate took the card-burning case of David O'Brien to the Supreme Court, arguing that the act of burning was a form of symbolic speech, but the Supreme Court upheld the conviction in United States v. O'Brien, 391 US 367 (1968). Thirteen-year-old Junior High student Mary Tinker wore a black armband to school in 1965 to object to the war and was suspended from school. The ACLU appealed her case to the Supreme Court and won a victory in Tinker v. Des Moines Independent Community School District. This critical case established that the government may not establish "enclaves" such as schools or prisons where all rights are forfeited.

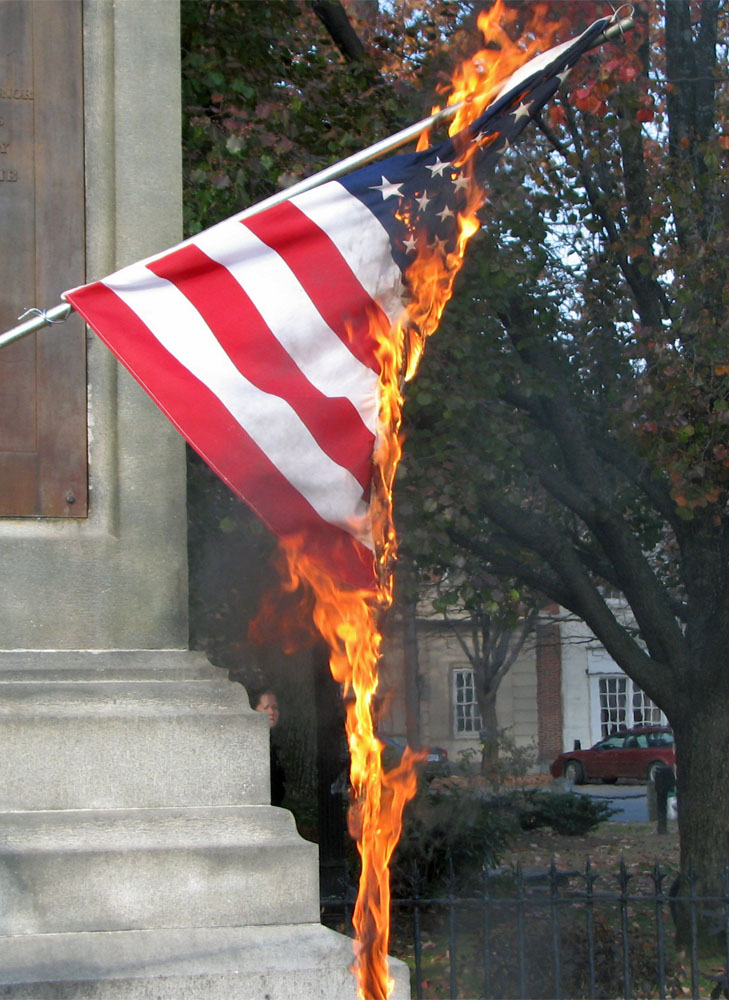
The ACLU contends that the Bill of Rights protects individuals who burn the U.S. flag as a form of expression.

The ACLU defended Sydney Street, who was arrested for burning an American flag to protest the reported assassination of civil rights leader James Meredith. In the Street v. New York decision, the court agreed with the ACLU that encouraging the country to abandon one of its national symbols was a constitutionally protected form of expression. The ACLU successfully defended Paul Cohen, who was arrested for wearing a jacket with the words "fuck the draft" on its back while he walked through the Los Angeles courthouse. The Supreme Court, in Cohen v. California, held that the vulgarity of the wording was essential to convey the intensity of the message.

Non-war-related free speech rights were also advanced during the Vietnam war era; in 1969, the ACLU defended a Ku Klux Klan member who advocated long-term violence against the government, and the Supreme Court concurred with the ACLU's argument in the landmark decision Brandenburg v. Ohio, which held that only speech which advocated imminent violence could be outlawed.

A major crisis gripped the ACLU in 1968 when a debate erupted over whether to defend Benjamin Spock and the Boston Five against federal charges that they encouraged draftees to avoid the draft. The ACLU board was deeply split over whether to defend the activists; half the board harbored anti-war sentiments and felt that the ACLU should lend its resources to the cause of the Boston Five. The other half of the board believed that civil liberties were not at stake and the ACLU would be taking a political stance. Behind the debate was the longstanding ACLU tradition that it was politically impartial and provided legal advice without regard to the defendants' political views. The board finally agreed to a compromise solution that permitted the ACLU to defend the anti-war activists without endorsing the activist's political views. Some critics of the ACLU suggest that the ACLU became a partisan political organization following the Spock case. After the Kent State shootings in 1970, ACLU leaders took another step toward politics by passing a resolution condemning the Vietnam War. The resolution was based on various legal arguments, including civil liberties violations and claiming that the war was illegal.

Also in 1968, the ACLU held an internal symposium to discuss its dual roles: providing "direct" legal support (defense for accused in their initial trial, benefiting only the individual defendant) and appellate support (providing amicus briefs during the appeal process, to establish widespread legal precedent). Historically, the ACLU was known for its appellate work, which led to landmark Supreme Court decisions, but by 1968, 90% of the ACLU's legal activities involved direct representation. The symposium concluded that both roles were valid for the ACLU.

== 1970s and 1980s ==
=== Watergate era ===
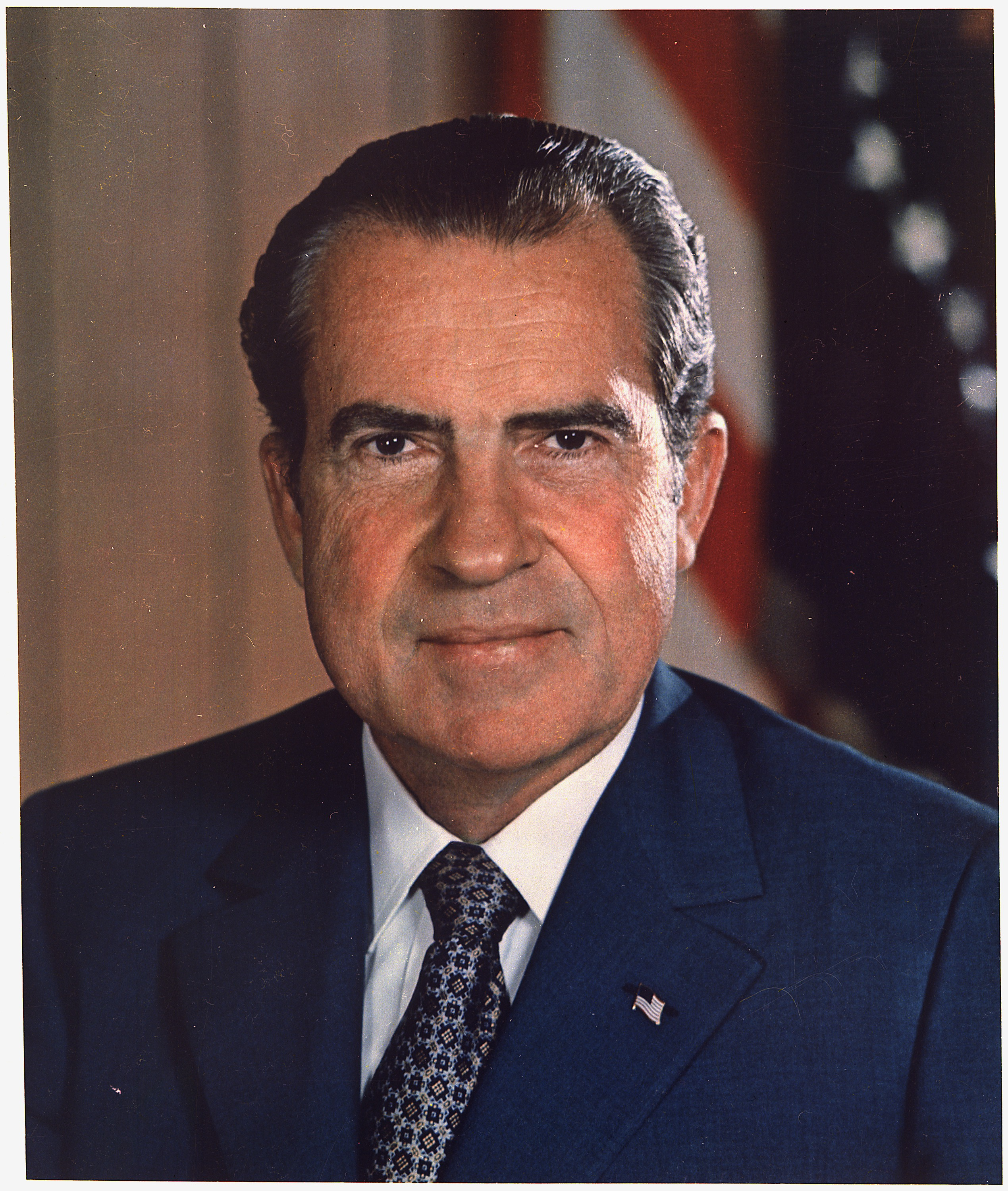
The ACLU was the first national organization to call for the impeachment of Richard Nixon.

The ACLU supported The New York Times in its 1971 suit against the government, requesting permission to publish the Pentagon Papers. The court upheld the Times and ACLU in the New York Times Co. v. United States ruling, which held that the government could not preemptively prohibit the publication of classified information and had to wait until after it was published to take action.

On September 30, 1973, the ACLU became first national organization to publicly call for the impeachment and removal from office of President Richard Nixon. Six civil liberties violations were cited as grounds: "specific proved violations of the rights of political dissent; usurpation of Congressional war‐making powers; establishment of a personal secret police which committed crimes; attempted interference in the trial of Daniel Ellsberg; distortion of the system of justice and perversion of other Federal agencies". One month later, after the House of Representatives began an impeachment inquiry against him, the organization released a 56‐page handbook detailing "17 things citizens could do to bring about the impeachment of President Nixon". This resolution, when placed beside the earlier resolution opposing the Vietnam war, convinced many ACLU critics, particularly conservatives, that the organization had transformed into a liberal political organization.

=== Enclaves and new civil liberties ===
The decade from 1965 to 1975 saw an expansion of civil liberties. Administratively, the ACLU responded by appointing Aryeh Neier to take over from Pemberton as executive director in 1970. Neier embarked on an ambitious program to expand the ACLU; he created the ACLU Foundation to raise funds and created several new programs to focus the ACLU's legal efforts. By 1974, ACLU membership had reached 275,000.

During those years, the ACLU worked to expand legal rights in three directions: new rights for persons within government-run "enclaves", new rights for members of what it called "victim groups", and privacy rights for citizens in general. At the same time, the organization grew substantially. The ACLU helped develop the field of constitutional law that governs "enclaves", which are groups of persons that live in conditions under government control. Enclaves include mental hospital patients, military members, prisoners, and students (while at school). The term enclave originated with Supreme Court justice Abe Fortas's use of the phrase "schools may not be enclaves of totalitarianism" in the Tinker v. Des Moines decision.

The ACLU initiated the legal field of student's rights with the Tinker v. Des Moines case and expanded it with cases such as Goss v. Lopez, which required schools to provide students an opportunity to appeal suspensions.

As early as 1945, the ACLU had taken a stand to protect the rights of the mentally ill when it drafted a model statute governing mental commitments. In the 1960s, the ACLU opposed involuntary commitments unless it could be demonstrated that the person was a danger to himself or the community. In the landmark 1975 O'Connor v. Donaldson decision, the ACLU represented a non-violent mental health patient who had been confined against his will for 15 years and persuaded the Supreme Court to rule such involuntary confinements illegal. The ACLU has also defended the rights of mentally ill individuals who are not dangerous but create disturbances. The New York chapter of the ACLU defended Billie Boggs, a woman with mental illness who exposed herself and defecated and urinated in public.

Before 1960, prisoners had virtually no recourse to the court system because courts considered prisoners to have no civil rights. That changed in the late 1950s, when the ACLU began representing prisoners subject to police brutality or deprived of religious reading material. In 1968, the ACLU successfully sued to desegregate the Alabama prison system; in 1969, the New York affiliate adopted a project to represent prisoners in New York prisons. Private attorney Phil Hirschkop discovered degrading conditions in Virginia prisons following the Virginia State Penitentiary strike and won an important victory in 1971's Landman v. Royster which prohibited Virginia from treating prisoners in inhumane ways. In 1972, the ACLU consolidated several prison rights efforts across the nation and created the National Prison Project. The ACLU's efforts led to landmark cases such as Ruiz v. Estelle (requiring reform of the Texas prison system), and in 1996 US Congress enacted the Prison Litigation Reform Act (PLRA) which codified prisoners' rights.

=== Victim groups ===
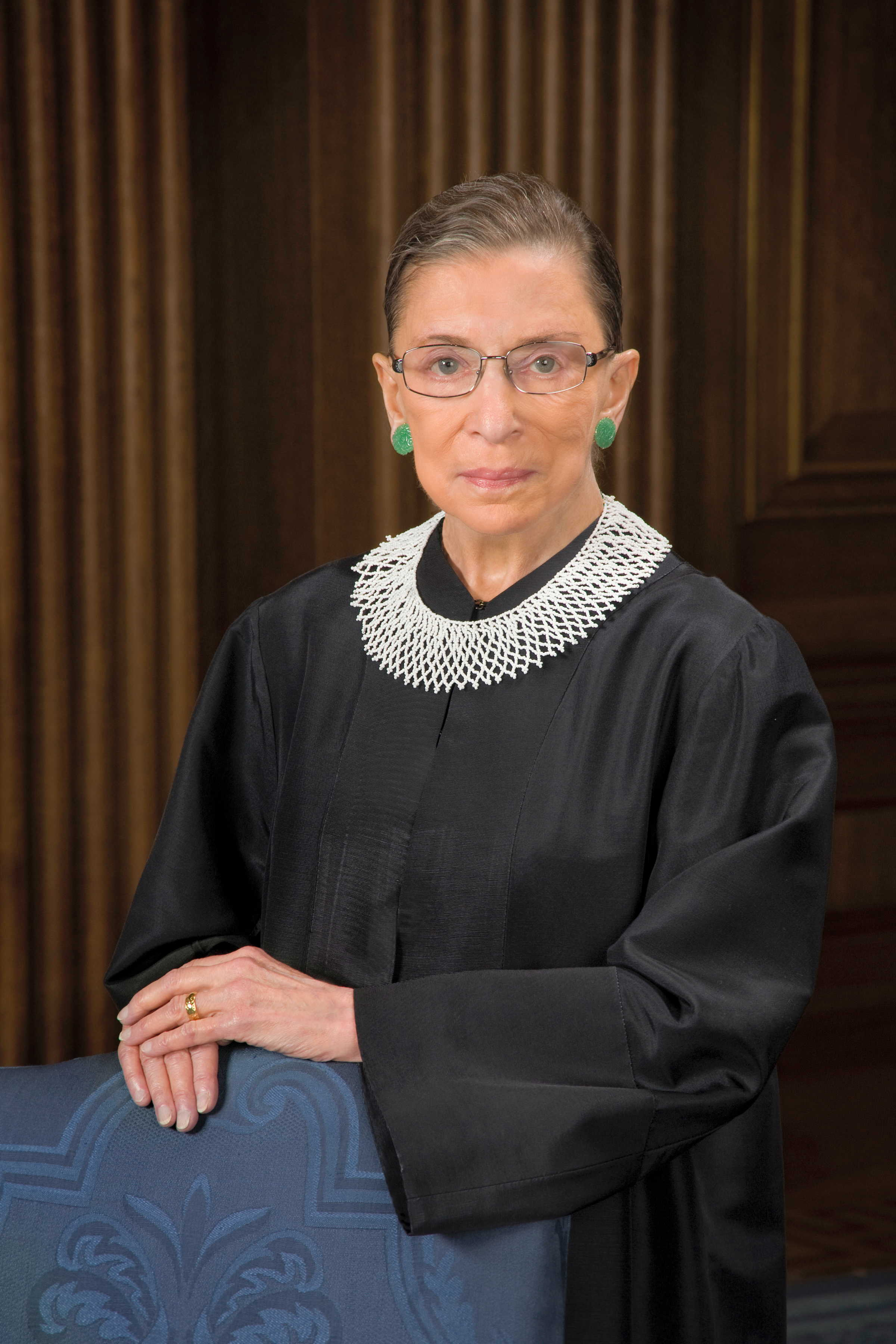
Ruth Bader Ginsburg co-founded the ACLU's Women's Rights Project in 1971. She was later appointed to the Supreme Court of the United States by President Bill Clinton.

During the 1960s and 1970s, the ACLU expanded its scope to include what it referred to as "victim groups", namely women, the poor, and homosexuals. Heeding the call of female members, the ACLU endorsed the Equal Rights Amendment in 1970 and created the Women's Rights Project in 1971. The Women's Rights Project dominated the legal field, handling more than twice as many cases as the National Organization for Women, including breakthrough cases such as Reed v. Reed, Frontiero v. Richardson, and Taylor v. Louisiana.

ACLU leader Harriet Pilpel raised the issue of the rights of homosexuals in 1964, and two years later, the ACLU formally endorsed gay rights. In 1972, ACLU cooperating attorneys in Oregon filed the first federal civil rights case involving a claim of unconstitutional discrimination against a gay or lesbian public school teacher. The US District Court held that a state statute that authorized school districts to fire teachers for "immorality" was unconstitutionally vague, and awarded monetary damages to the teacher. The court refused to reinstate the teacher, and the Ninth Circuit Court of Appeals affirmed that refusal by a 2-to-1 vote. In 1973, the ACLU created the Sexual Privacy Project (later the Gay and Lesbian Rights Project), which combated discrimination against homosexuals. This support continued into the 2000s. For example, after then-Senator Larry Craig was arrested for soliciting sex in a public restroom in 2007, the ACLU wrote an amicus brief for Craig, saying that sex between consenting adults in public places was protected under privacy rights.

The rights of the poor were another area that the ACLU expanded. In 1966 and again in 1968, activists within the ACLU encouraged the organization to adopt a policy overhauling the welfare system and guaranteeing low-income families a baseline income; but the ACLU board did not approve the proposals. However, the ACLU played a key role in the 1968 King v. Smith decision, where the Supreme Court ruled that welfare benefits for children could not be denied by a state simply because the mother cohabited with a boyfriend.

=== Reproductive Freedom Project ===
The ACLU founded the Reproductive Freedom Project in 1974 to defend individuals the government obstructs in cases involving access to abortions, birth control, or sexual education. According to its mission statement, the project works to provide access to reproductive health care for individuals. The project also opposes abstinence-only sex education, arguing that it promotes an unwillingness to use contraceptives.

In 1980, the Project filed Poe v. Lynchburg Training School & Hospital which attempted to overturn Buck v. Bell, the 1927 US Supreme Court decision which had allowed the Commonwealth of Virginia to legally sterilize persons it deemed to be mentally defective without their permission. Though the Court did not overturn Buck v.Bell, in 1985, the state agreed to provide counseling and medical treatment to the survivors among the 7,200 to 8,300 people sterilized between 1927 and 1979. In 1977, the ACLU took part in and litigated Walker v. Pierce, the federal circuit court case that led to federal regulations to prevent Medicaid patients from being sterilized without their knowledge or consent. In 1981–1990, the Project litigated Hodgson v. Minnesota, which resulted in the Supreme Court overturning a state law requiring both parents to be notified before a minor could legally have an abortion. In the 1990s, the Project provided legal assistance and resource kits to those who were being challenged for educating about sexuality and AIDS. In 1995, the Project filed an amicus brief in Curtis v. School Committee of Falmouth, which allowed for the distribution of condoms in a public school.

The Reproductive Freedom Project focuses on three ideas: (1) to "reverse the shortage of trained abortion providers throughout the country" (2) to "block state and federal welfare "reform" proposals that cut off benefits for children who are born to women already receiving welfare, unmarried women, or teenagers" and (3) to "stop the elimination of vital reproductive health services as a result of hospital mergers and health care networks". The Project proposes to achieve these goals through legal action and litigation.

=== Privacy ===
The right to privacy is not explicitly identified in the US Constitution, but the ACLU led the charge to establish such rights in the indecisive Poe v. Ullman (1961) case, which addressed a state statute outlawing contraception. The issue arose again in Griswold v. Connecticut (1965), and this time the Supreme Court adopted the ACLU's position and formally declared a right to privacy. The New York affiliate of the ACLU pushed to eliminate anti-abortion laws starting in 1964, a year before Griswold was decided; in 1967 the ACLU itself formally adopted the right to abortion as a policy. The ACLU led the defense in United States v. Vuitch (1971), which expanded the right of physicians to determine when abortions were necessary. These efforts culminated in one of the most controversial Supreme Court decisions, Roe v. Wade (1973), which legalized abortion throughout the United States. The ACLU successfully argued against state bans on interracial marriage, in the case of Loving v. Virginia (1967).

Related to privacy, the ACLU engaged in several battles to ensure that government records about individuals were kept private and to give individuals the right to review their records. The ACLU supported several measures, including the 1970 Fair Credit Reporting Act, which required credit agencies to divulge credit information to individuals; the 1973 Family Educational Rights and Privacy Act, which provided students the right to access their records; and the 1974 Privacy Act, which prevented the federal government from disclosing personal information without good cause.

=== Allegations of bias ===
In the early 1970s, conservatives and libertarians began to criticize the ACLU for being too political and too liberal. Legal scholar Joseph W. Bishop wrote that the ACLU's trend to partisanship started with its defense of Spock's anti-war protests. Critics also blamed the ACLU for encouraging the Supreme Court to embrace judicial activism. Critics claimed that the ACLU's support of controversial decisions like Roe v. Wade and Griswold v. Connecticut violated the intention of the authors of the Bill of Rights. The ACLU became an issue in the 1988 presidential campaign, when Republican candidate George H. W. Bush accused Democratic candidate Michael Dukakis (a member of the ACLU) of being a "card carrying member of the ACLU".

=== The Skokie case ===
In 1977, the National Socialist Party of America, led by Frank Collin, applied to the town of Skokie, Illinois, for a permit to hold a demonstration in the town park. Skokie at the time had a majority population of Jews, totaling 40,000 of 70,000 citizens, some of whom were survivors of Nazi concentration camps. Skokie refused to grant the NSPA a permit and passed ordinances against hate speech and military wear, in addition to requiring an insurance bond. Skokie's Village Council ordered village attorney, Harvey Schwartz, to seek an injunction to stop the demonstration. The ACLU assisted Collin and appealed to federal court, eventually prevailing in NSPA v. Village of Skokie

The Skokie case was heavily publicized across America, partially because Jewish groups such as the Jewish Defense League and Anti Defamation League strenuously objected to the demonstration, leading many members of the ACLU to cancel their memberships. The Illinois affiliate of the ACLU lost about 25% of its membership and nearly one-third of its budget. The financial strain from the controversy led to layoffs at local chapters. After the membership crisis died down, the ACLU sent out a fund-raising appeal which explained their rationale for the Skokie case and raised over $500,000 ($2,656,507 in 2025 dollars).

=== Reagan era ===
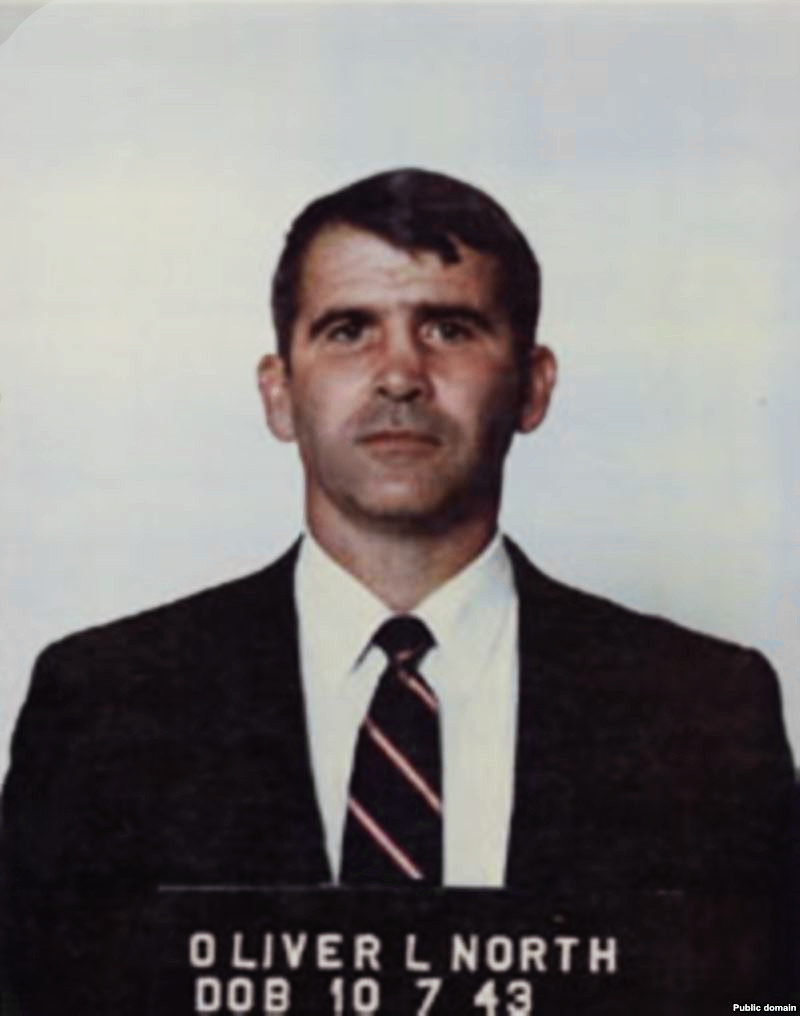
The ACLU defended Oliver North in 1990, arguing that his conviction was tainted by coerced testimony.

The inauguration of Ronald Reagan as president in 1981 ushered in an eight-year period of conservative leadership in the US government. Under Reagan's leadership, the government pushed a conservative social agenda.

Fifty years after the Scopes trial, the ACLU found itself fighting another classroom case, the Arkansas 1981 creationism statute, which required schools to teach the biblical account of creation as a scientific alternative to evolution. The ACLU won the case in the McLean v. Arkansas decision.

In 1982, the ACLU became involved in a case involving the distribution of child pornography (New York v. Ferber). In an amicus brief, the ACLU argued that child pornography that violates the three prong obscenity test should be outlawed. However, the law was overly restrictive because it banned artistic displays and non-obscene material. The court did not adopt the ACLU's position.

During the 1988 presidential election, Vice President George H. W. Bush noted that his opponent Massachusetts Governor Michael Dukakis had described himself as a "card-carrying member of the ACLU" and used that as evidence that Dukakis was "a strong, passionate liberal" and "out of the mainstream". The phrase subsequently was used by the organization in an advertising campaign.

== 1990s ==
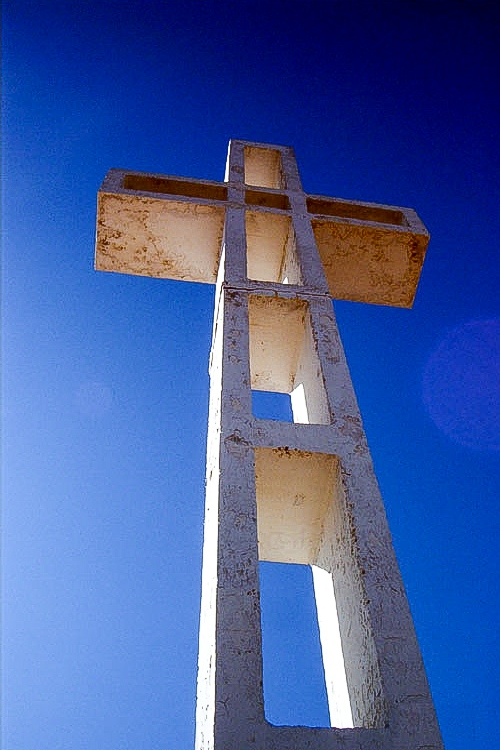
A California affiliate of the ACLU sued to remove the Mount Soledad Cross from public lands in San Diego.

In 1990, the ACLU defended Lieutenant Colonel Oliver North, whose conviction was tainted by coerced testimony – a violation of his Fifth Amendment rights – during the Iran–Contra affair, where Oliver North was involved in illegal weapons sales to Iran to illegally fund the Contra guerillas.

In 1997, ruling unanimously in the case of Reno v. American Civil Liberties Union, the Supreme Court voided the anti-indecency provisions of the Communications Decency Act (the CDA), finding they violated the freedom of speech provisions of the First Amendment. In their decision, the Supreme Court held that the CDA's "use of the undefined terms 'indecent' and 'patently offensive' will provoke uncertainty among speakers about how the two standards relate to each other and just what they mean." In 2000, Marvin Johnson, a legislative counsel for the ACLU, stated that proposed anti-spam legislation infringed on free speech by denying anonymity and by forcing spam to be labeled as such, "Standardized labeling is compelled speech." He also stated, "It's relatively simple to click and delete." The debate found the ACLU joining with the Direct Marketing Association and the Center for Democracy and Technology in 2000 in criticizing a bipartisan bill in the House of Representatives. As early as 1997, the ACLU had taken a strong position that nearly all spam legislation was improper, although it has supported "opt-out" requirements in some cases. The ACLU opposed the 2003 CAN-SPAM act suggesting that it could have a chilling effect on speech in cyberspace. It has been criticized for this position.

In November 2000, 15 African-American residents of Hearne, Texas, were indicted on drug charges after being arrested in a series of "drug sweeps". The ACLU filed a class-action lawsuit, Kelly v. Paschall, on their behalf, alleging that the arrests were unlawful. The ACLU contended that 15 percent of Hearne's male African-American population aged 18 to 34 were arrested based only on the "uncorroborated word of a single unreliable confidential informant coerced by police to make cases". On May 11, 2005, the ACLU and Robertson County announced a confidential settlement of the lawsuit, an outcome which "both sides stated that they were satisfied with". The District Attorney dismissed the charges against the plaintiffs of the suit. The 2009 film American Violet depicts this case.

In 2000, the ACLU's Massachusetts affiliate represented the North American Man Boy Love Association (NAMBLA), on First Amendment grounds, in the Curley v. NAMBLA wrongful death civil suit. The organization was sued because a man who raped and murdered a child had visited the NAMBLA website. Also in 2000, the ACLU lost the Boy Scouts of America v. Dale case, which had asked the Supreme Court to require the Boy Scouts of America to drop their policy of prohibiting homosexuals from becoming Boy Scout leaders.

== 21st century ==
=== Free speech ===
In 2006, the ACLU of Washington State joined with a pro-gun rights organization, the Second Amendment Foundation, and prevailed in a lawsuit against the North Central Regional Library District (NCRL) in Washington for its policy of refusing to disable restrictions upon an adult patron's request. Library patrons attempting to access pro-gun web sites were blocked, and the library refused to remove the blocks. In 2012, the ACLU sued the same library system for refusing to disable temporarily, at the request of an adult patron, Internet filters which blocked access to Google Images.

In 2006, the ACLU challenged a Missouri law prohibiting picketing outside veterans' funerals. The ACLU filed the suit in support of the Westboro Baptist Church and Shirley Phelps-Roper, who were threatened with arrest. The Westboro Baptist Church is well known for its picket signs that contain messages such as "God Hates Fags", "Thank God for Dead Soldiers", and "Thank God for 9/11". The ACLU issued a statement calling the legislation a "law that infringes on Shirley Phelps-Roper's rights to religious liberty and free speech." The ACLU prevailed in the lawsuit.

The ACLU argued in an amicus brief to the Supreme Court that a decision on the constitutionality of a Massachusetts law required the consideration of additional evidence because lower courts have undervalued the right to engage in sidewalk counseling. The law prohibited sidewalk counselors from approaching women outside abortion facilities and offering them alternatives to abortion but allowed escorts to speak with them and accompany them into the building. In overturning the law in McCullen v. Coakley, the Supreme Court unanimously ruled that it violated the counselors' freedom of speech and constituted viewpoint discrimination.

In 2009, the ACLU filed an amicus brief in Citizens United v. FEC, arguing that the Bipartisan Campaign Reform Act of 2002 violated the First Amendment right to free speech by curtailing political speech. This stance on the landmark Citizens United case caused considerable disagreement within the organization, resulting in a discussion about its future stance during a quarterly board meeting in 2010. On March 27, 2012, the ACLU reaffirmed its stance in support of the Supreme Court's Citizens United ruling, at the same time voicing support for expanded public financing of election campaigns and stating the organization would firmly oppose any future constitutional amendment limiting free speech.

In 2012, the ACLU filed suit on behalf of the Ku Klux Klan of Georgia, claiming that the KKK was unfairly rejected from the state's "Adopt-a-Highway" program. The ACLU prevailed in the lawsuit.

=== Move towards identity politics ===
Some have claimed the ACLU is reducing its support of unpopular free speech (specifically by declining to defend speech made by Ku Klux Klan and neo-Nazis) in favor of progressive politics. Instead, critics contend that the organization has instead become a progressive advocacy organization.

One basis of these allegations was a 2017 statement the ACLU president made to a reporter after the death of a counter-protester during the 2017 Unite the Right rally in Virginia, where Romero told a reporter that the ACLU would no longer support legal cases of activists that wish to carry guns at their protests. Another basis for these claims was an internal ACLU memo dated June 2018, discussing factors to evaluate when deciding whether to take a case. The memo listed several factors to consider, including "the extent to which the speech may assist in advancing the goals of white supremacists or others whose views are contrary to our values."

Some analysts viewed this as a retreat from the ACLU's historically strong support of First Amendment rights, regardless of whether minorities were negatively impacted by the speech, citing the ACLU's past support for certain KKK and Nazi legal cases. The memo's authors stated that the memo did not define a change in official ACLU policy, but was intended as a guideline to assist ACLU affiliates in deciding which cases to take. Former ACLU director Ira Glasser stated that "the ACLU might not take the Skokie case today." In the 2020 documentary Mighty Ira, which chronicles Glasser's life and career at the ACLU, Glasser says he would defend the ACLU's decision to take the Skokie case again today if needed.

In 2021, the ACLU responded to the criticisms by denying that they are reducing their support for unpopular First Amendment causes and listing 27 cases from 2017 to 2021 where the ACLU supported a party holding an unpopular or repugnant viewpoint. The cases included one which challenged college restrictions on hate speech; a case defending a Catholic school's right to discriminate in hiring; and a case that defended antisemitic protesters who marched outside a synagogue.

In 2024, the National Labor Relations Board sued the ACLU in an unfair labor practice case after the ACLU fired an Asian attorney for criticizing her Black bosses. The ACLU contended that the employee's use of phrases like "the beatings will continue until morale improves" was racially coded and that it "caused serious harm to Black members of the A.C.L.U. community." According to Jeremy W. Peters of The New York Times, critics of the ACLU saw the firing as "a sign of how far the group has strayed from its core mission — defending free speech — and has instead aligned itself with a progressive politics that is intensely focused on identity."

=== LGBTQ issues ===
In March 2004, the ACLU, along with Lambda Legal and the National Center for Lesbian Rights, sued the state of California on behalf of six same-sex couples who were denied marriage licenses. That case, Woo v. Lockyer, was eventually consolidated into In re Marriage Cases, the California Supreme Court case which led to same-sex marriage being available in that state from June 16, 2008, until Proposition 8 was passed on November 4, 2008. The ACLU, Lambda Legal and the National Center for Lesbian Rights then challenged Proposition 8 and won.

In 2011, the ACLU started its Don't Filter Me project, countering LGBT-related Internet censorship in public schools in the United States.

On January 7, 2013, the ACLU settled with the federal government in Collins v. United States that provided for the payment of full separation pay to servicemembers discharged under "don't ask, don't tell" since November 10, 2004, who had previously been granted only half that. Some 181 were expected to receive about $13,000 each.

In 2021, the ACLU filed a brief siding with a school district that had a policy of using preferred pronouns for transgender students. Some analysts felt this was a retreat from the ACLU's historical defense of the First Amendment because the ACLU was opposing the teachers who were disciplined for refusing to use the preferred pronouns.

=== Second amendment ===
In light of the Supreme Court's Heller decision recognizing that the Constitution protects an individual right to bear arms, ACLU of Nevada took a position of supporting "the individual's right to bear arms subject to constitutionally permissible regulations" and pledged to "defend this right as it defends other constitutional rights". In 2021, the ACLU supported the position that the Second Amendment was originally written to ensure that Southern states could use militias to suppress slave uprisings, and that anti-Blackness ensured its inclusion in the Bill of Rights.

=== Anti-terrorism issues ===
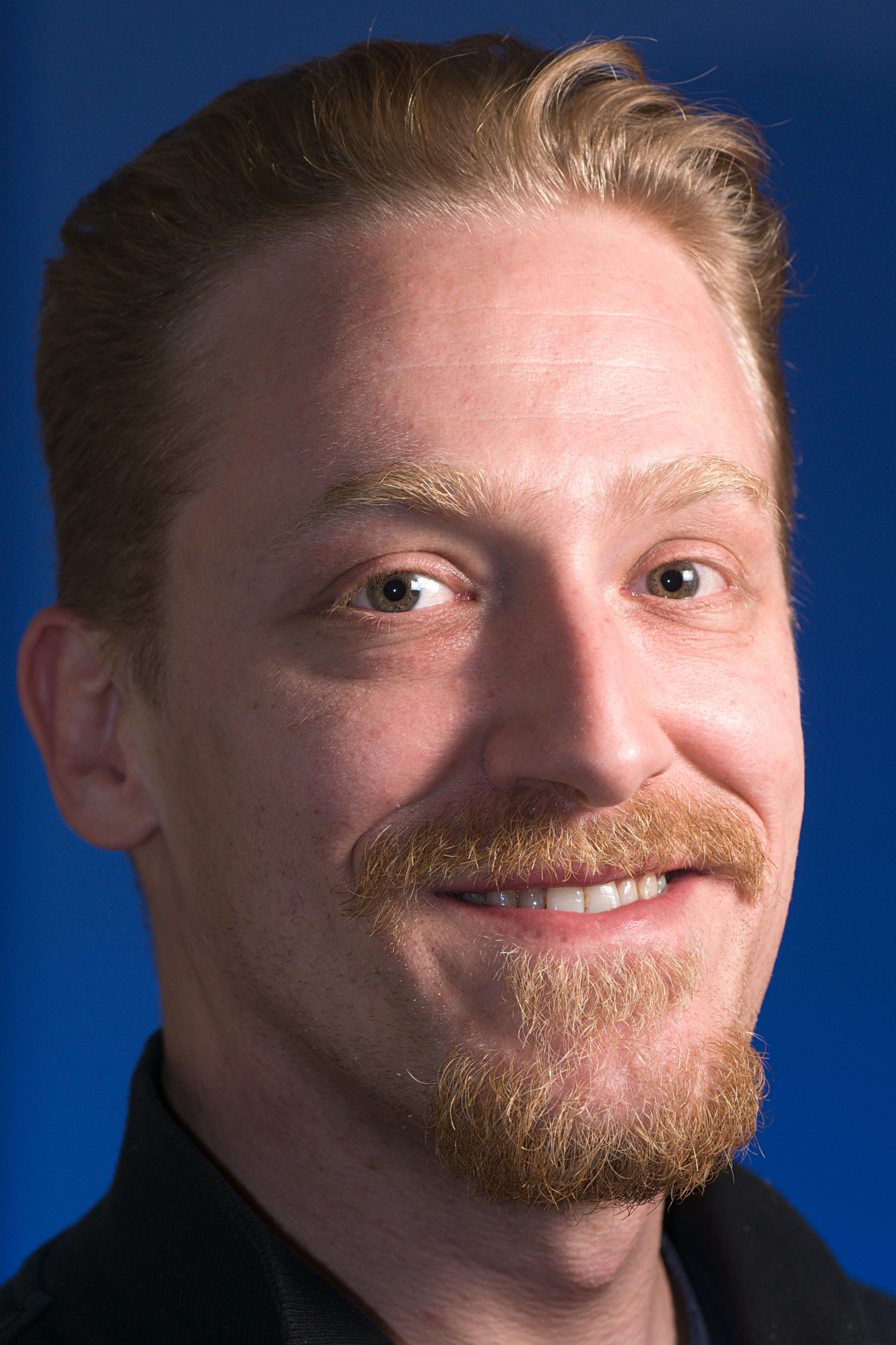
The ACLU represented Internet service provider Nicholas Merrill in a 2004 lawsuit which challenged the government's right to gather information about Internet access secretly.

After the September 11 attacks, the federal government instituted a broad range of new measures to combat terrorism, including the passage of the Patriot Act. The ACLU challenged many of the measures, claiming that they violated rights regarding due process, privacy, illegal searches, and cruel and unusual punishment. An ACLU policy statement states:

Our way forward lies in decisively turning our backs on the policies and practices that violate our greatest strength: our Constitution and the commitment it embodies to the rule of law. Liberty and security do not compete in a zero-sum game; our freedoms are the very foundation of our strength and security. The ACLU's National Security Project advocates for national security policies that are consistent with the Constitution, the rule of law, and fundamental human rights. The Project litigates cases relating to detention, torture, discrimination, surveillance, censorship, and secrecy.

During the ensuing debate regarding the proper balance of civil liberties and security, the membership of the ACLU increased by 20%, bringing the group's total enrollment to 330,000. The growth continued, and by August 2008 ACLU membership was greater than 500,000. It remained at that level through 2011.

The ACLU has been a vocal opponent of the Patriot Act of 2001, the PATRIOT 2 Act of 2003, and associated legislation made in response to the threat of domestic terrorism. In response to a requirement of the USA PATRIOT Act, the ACLU withdrew from the Combined Federal Campaign charity drive. The campaign required ACLU employees to be checked against a federal anti-terrorism watch list. The ACLU has stated that it would "reject $500,000 in contributions from private individuals rather than submit to a government 'blacklist' policy".

In 2004, the ACLU sued the federal government in American Civil Liberties Union v. Ashcroft on behalf of Nicholas Merrill, owner of an Internet service provider. Under the provisions of the Patriot Act, the government had issued national security letters to Merrill to compel him to provide private Internet access information from some of his customers. In addition, the government placed a gag order on Merrill, forbidding him from discussing the matter with anyone.

In January 2006, the ACLU filed a lawsuit, ACLU v. NSA, in a federal district court in Michigan, challenging government spying in the NSA warrantless surveillance controversy. On August 17, 2006, that court ruled that the warrantless wiretapping program was unconstitutional and ordered it ended immediately. However, the order was stayed pending an appeal. The Bush administration did suspend the program while the appeal was being heard. In February 2008, the US Supreme Court turned down an appeal from the ACLU to let it pursue a lawsuit against the program that began shortly after the September 11 terror attacks.

The ACLU and other organizations also filed separate lawsuits against telecommunications companies. The ACLU filed a lawsuit in Illinois (Terkel v. AT&T), which was dismissed because of the state secrets privilege and two others in California requesting injunctions against AT&T and Verizon. On August 10, 2006, the lawsuits against the telecommunications companies were transferred to a federal judge in San Francisco.

The ACLU represents a Muslim-American who was detained but never accused of a crime in Ashcroft v. al-Kidd, a civil suit against former Attorney General John Ashcroft. In January 2010, the American military released the names of 645 detainees held at the Bagram Theater Internment Facility in Afghanistan, modifying its long-held position against publicizing such information. This list was prompted by a Freedom of Information Act lawsuit filed in September 2009 by the ACLU, whose lawyers had also requested detailed information about conditions, rules, and regulations. The ACLU has also criticized targeted killings of American citizens who fight against the United States.

On August 10, 2020, in an opinion article for USA Today by Anthony D. Romero, the ACLU called for the dismantling of the United States Department of Homeland Security over the deployment of federal forces in July 2020 during the George Floyd protests. On August 26, 2020, the ACLU filed a lawsuit on behalf of seven protesters and three veterans following the protests in Portland, Oregon, which accused the Trump Administration of using excessive force and unlawful arrests with federal officers.

=== Trump administration ===
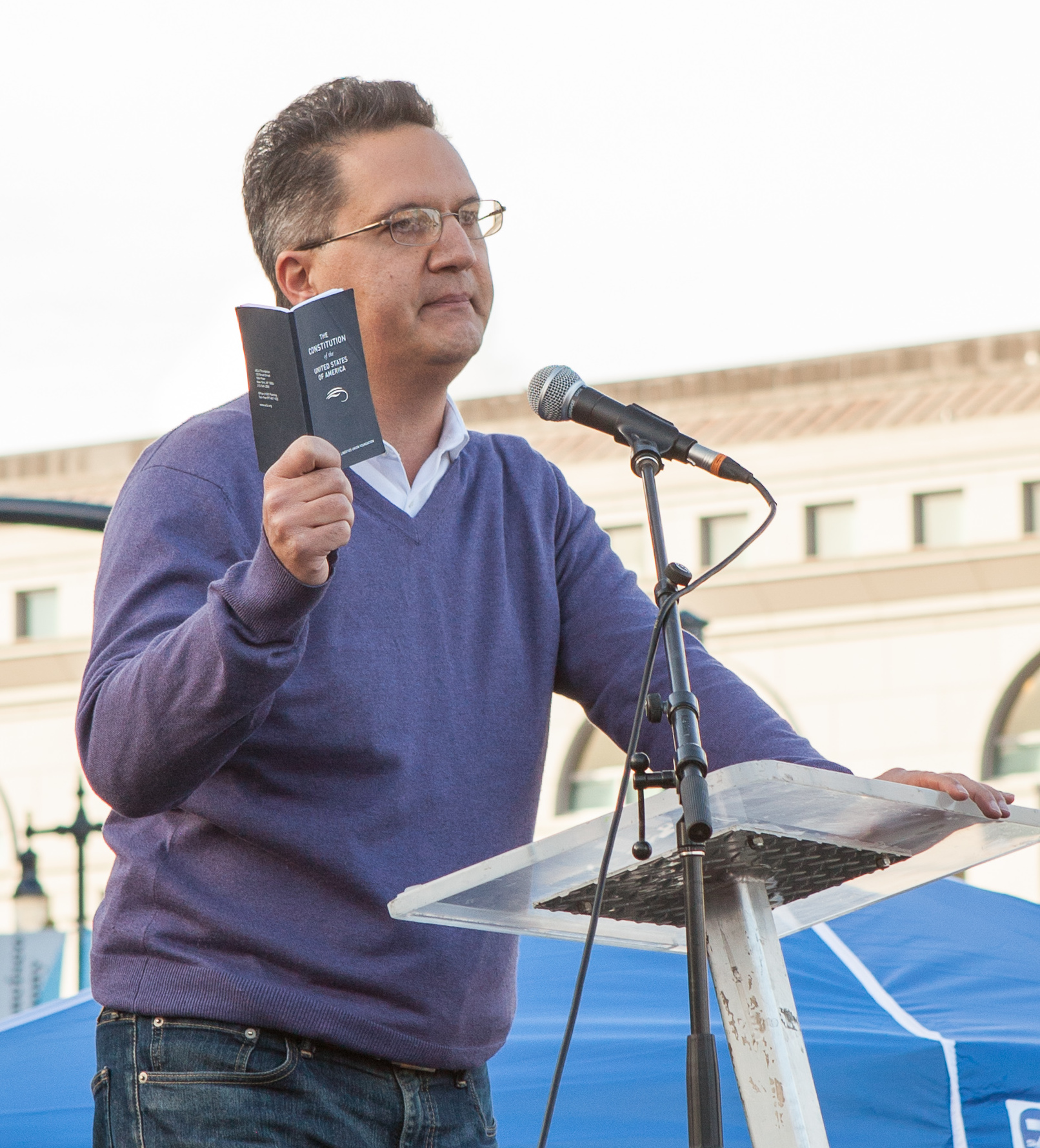
Abdi Soltani, executive director of Northern California ACLU, speaks at a San Francisco protest of the U.S. immigration ban.

Following Donald Trump's election as president on November 8, 2016, the ACLU responded on Twitter by saying: "Should President-elect Donald Trump attempt to implement his unconstitutional campaign promises, we'll see him in court." On January 27, 2017, President Trump signed an executive order indefinitely barring "Syrian refugees from entering the United States, suspended all refugee admissions for 120 days and blocked citizens of seven Muslim-majority countries, refugees or otherwise, from entering the United States for 90 days: Iran, Iraq, Libya, Somalia, Sudan, Syria and Yemen". The ACLU responded by filing a lawsuit against the ban on behalf of Hameed Khalid Darweesh and Haider Sameer Abdulkhaleq Alshawi, who had been detained at JFK International Airport. On January 28, 2017, District Court Judge Ann Donnelly granted a temporary injunction against the immigration order, saying it was difficult to see any harm from allowing the newly arrived immigrants to remain in the country.

In response to Trump's order, the ACLU raised more than $24 million from more than 350,000 individual online donations in two days. This amounted to six times what the ACLU normally receives in online donations in a year. Celebrities donating included Chris Sacca (who offered to match other people's donations and ultimately gave $150,000), Rosie O'Donnell, Judd Apatow, Sia, John Legend, and Adele. The number of members of the ACLU doubled in the time from the election to end of January to 1 million.

Grants and contributions increased from US$106,628,381 reported by the 2016 year-end income statement to $274,104,575 by the 2017 year-end statement. The segment's primary revenue source came from individual contributions in response to the Trump presidency's infringements on civil liberties. The surge in donations more than doubled the total support and revenue of the non-profit organization year over year from 2016 to 2017. Besides filing more lawsuits than during previous presidential administrations, the ACLU has spent more money on advertisements and messaging as well, weighing in on elections and pressing political concerns. This increased public profile has drawn some accusations that the organization has become more politically partisan than in previous decades.

=== Miscellaneous ===
In June 2004, the school district in Dover, Pennsylvania, required that its high school biology students listen to a statement that asserted that the theory of evolution is not fact and mentioning intelligent design as an alternative theory. Several parents called the ACLU to complain because they believed that the school was promoting a religious idea in the classroom and violating the Establishment Clause of the First Amendment. The ACLU, joined by Americans United for Separation of Church and State, represented the parents in a lawsuit against the school district. After a lengthy trial, Judge John E. Jones III ruled in favor of the parents in the Kitzmiller v. Dover Area School District decision.

In April 2006, Edward Jones and the ACLU sued the City of Los Angeles, on behalf of Robert Lee Purrie and five other homeless people, for the city's violation of the 8th and 14th Amendments to the US Constitution, and Article I, sections 7 and 17 of the California Constitution (supporting due process and equal protection, and prohibiting cruel and unusual punishment). The Court ruled in favor of the ACLU, stating that "the LAPD cannot arrest people for sitting, lying, or sleeping on public sidewalks in Skid Row." Enforcement of section 41.18(d) 24 hours a day against persons with nowhere else to sit, lie, or sleep other than on public streets and sidewalks is breaking these amendments. The Court said the anti-camping ordinance is "one of the most restrictive municipal laws regulating public spaces in the United States". Jones and the ACLU wanted a compromise in which the LAPD is barred from enforcing section 41.18(d) (arrest, seizure, and imprisonment) in Skid Row between 9:00 p.m. and 6:30 am. The compromise plan permitted the homeless to sleep on the sidewalk, provided they were not "within 10 feet of any business or residential entrance" and only between these hours. One of the motivations for the compromise was the shortage of space in the prison system. Downtown development business interests and the Central City Association (CCA) were against the settlement. Police Chief William Bratton said the case had slowed the police effort to fight crime and clean up Skid Row and that when he was allowed to clean up Skid Row, real estate profited. On September 20, 2006, the Los Angeles City Council voted to reject the compromise.

In 2009, the Oregon ACLU unsuccessfully opposed changing state law to permit teachers to wear religious clothing in classrooms, citing the separation of church and state principles.

In 2018, the ACLU conceived and ghostwrote an op-ed in The Washington Post in which Amber Heard accused her ex-husband Johnny Depp of domestic abuse, leading Depp to sue Heard for defamation in the 2022 trial Depp v. Heard. The ACLU testified in the trial that they wrote the op-ed in exchange for a $3.5 million donation pledge from Heard, and timed its release to capitalize on the press from Heard's newly released film Aquaman. The ACLU demanded $86,000 from Depp for the cost of producing documents for the case. At the end of the trial, the jury ruled that Heard had defamed Depp with actual malice in all three counts related to the Washington Post op-ed.

In June 2020, the ACLU sued the federal government for denying Paycheck Protection Program loans to business owners with criminal backgrounds.

== Sources ==
- Alley, Robert S. (1999). The Constitution & Religion: Leading Supreme Court Cases on Church and State. Amherst, New York: Prometheus Books. ISBN 978-1-57392-703-1.
- Beito, David T. (2023). The New Deal's War on the Bill of Rights: The Untold Story of FDR's Concentration Camps, Censorship, and Mass Surveillance (First ed.). Oakland: Independent Institute. pp. 4–7. ISBN 978-1598133561.
- Bodenhamer, David, and Ely, James, Editors (2008). The Bill of Rights in Modern America, second edition. Indiana University Press. ISBN 978-0-253-21991-6.
- Donohue, William (1985). The Politics of the American Civil Liberties Union. Transaction Books. ISBN 0-88738-021-2.
- Kaminer, Wendy (2009). Worst Instincts: Cowardice, Conformity, and the ACLU. Beacon Press. ISBN 978-0-8070-4430-8. A dissident member of the ACLU criticizes its post-9/11 actions as betraying the core principles of its founders.
- Kauffman, Christopher J. (1982). Faith and Fraternalism: The History of the Knights of Columbus, 1882–1982. Harper and Row. ISBN 978-0-06-014940-6.
- Lamson, Peggy (1976). Roger Baldwin: Founder of the American Civil Liberties Union. Houghton Mifflin Company. ISBN 0-395-24761-6.
- Walker, Samuel (1990). In Defense of American Liberties: A History of the ACLU. Oxford University Press. ISBN 0-19-504539-4.
