= William Perl =

American physicist and Soviet spy

William Perl (1920–1970), whose original name was William Mutterperl, was an American physicist and Soviet spy.

== Background ==
While a student at the City College of New York, Perl joined the Steinmetz Club, the campus branch of the Young Communist League, where he met and befriended future Soviet spies Julius Rosenberg, Morton Sobell and Joel Barr. Perl graduated with a degree in engineering in 1939, and in 1940 began working for the National Advisory Committee for Aeronautics (NACA) at their Langley Army Air Base research facility in Hampton, Virginia. In 1944 Perl transferred to the NACA Lewis Flight Propulsion Laboratory in Cleveland, Ohio. Both jobs provided Perl with access to extensive classified materials. NACA sent Perl to Columbia University to pursue doctoral studies in Physics. While at Columbia, Perl lived in the same Morton Street apartment where Barr and Alfred Sarant had lived.

== Career ==
Following his doctoral work at Columbia, Perl returned to Cleveland to work on a jet propulsion project related to supersonic flight. Perl was nearly given a position with the U.S. Atomic Energy Commission when his connection with Barr and Sarant, suspected Communists, was turned up by a security check.

== Rosenberg Case ==
In July 1950, Vivian Glassman, Barr's fiancée, visited Perl in Cleveland to give him $2,000, advising him to go to Europe. Unlike Barr and Sarant, Perl decided not to flee the country, perhaps thinking he might be able to salvage his career.

ACLU lawyer Raymond L. Wise "of 80 Broad Street" served as Perl's attorney.

=== Rosenberg Grand Jury ===
Perl appeared before the Rosenberg Grand Jury in the summer of 1950, denying any relationship with Julius Rosenberg, Morton Sobell, Max Elitcher, Ann Sidorovich, and Michael Sidorovich. By August 29, 1950, Wise was advising Perl to cooperate. On March 10, 1951, Wise and Perl met with FBI agents; Wise stated that Perl had paid him a "substantial fee" as retainer. On March 15, 1951, Perl was arrested. In April 1951, FBI advised Wise that they would make no deal with Perl over a plea of perjury. Wise argued that the Government lacked jurisdiction to indict, to no avail. The Government delayed the trial in September 1951 due to Wise's illness. In June 1952, Wise asked for a reduction in bail from twenty to five thousand dollars; the judge reserved the decision. In December 1952, Wise asked for another deferral, as he would be in Florida for the winter; the judge decided to keep to resumption in February 1953. In March 1953, Wise again asked for deferral until after Wise's return from Florida on April 21, 1953, stating that Perl would otherwise ask for adjournment. On March 26, 1953, the Government agreed to resume on May 4, 1953. After his return in late April 1953, Wise "stated in strict confidence that he felt Perl should plead guilty and cooperate with Government in giving espionage into." By early May 1953, Wise reported that Perl remained unwilling to cooperate. On May 4, 1953, U.S. Judge Thomas Francis Murphy (government prosecutor in the Hiss Case) referred trial for instant case of perjury to Judge Sylvester J. Ryan of the United States District Court for the Southern District of New York, to commence on May 19, 1953, with Lloyd McMahon and Robert Martin prosecuting and Raymond L. Wise and Stanley Kanavek defending.

=== Trial ===
In court, the Government argued that Perl had knowingly lied that he knew Julius Rosenberg and Morton Sobell when they were all members of the Young Communists League or that he knew Helene Elitcher, Michael Sidorovich, or Anne Sidorvich. Wise argued that Perl did not lie intentionally. Perl could not explain how or whether Vivian Glassman had given him paper with Rosenberg's name on it because Perl had destroyed the paper. He could not explain why Sobell had used him as a job reference. Wise then argued that, earlier, Perl had appeared voluntarily when answering, not as a defendant and not under oath. On May 26, 1953, in his summation, Wise argued that Perl believed his answers true at the time he was answering. For instance, he answered truthfully that he did not "know" Sobell, as in "intimately," not whether he ever knew him at all. As for evidence from Helene Ellitcher, Wise argued that the court could only expect her to corroborate the testimony of her husband, Max Elitcher, a communist and known perjurer. Perl had no motive to perjure himself; Wise asked for acquittal on all four perjury charges. On May 22, 1953, Perl was found guilty on two counts of perjury for lying about his "acquaintance and association" with Rosenberg and Sobell (and acquitted of two other counts). Perl served two concurrent five-year sentences at the New York House of Detention.

== Venona ==
Perl is mentioned in 14 KGB messages decrypted by the Venona project, a joint British-American intelligence effort, under the covernames 'Gnome' and 'Jacob'. One cable, dated 14 September 1944, requests a $500 bonus for Perl's information on a Westinghouse jet engine assembly. John Earl Haynes and Harvey Klehr have suggested that data provided by him aided the Soviets in the unique tail-fin design of the MiG-15 fighter used in the Korean War.

== See also ==
- Atomic spies
- Julius Rosenberg
- Morton Sobell
- Raymond L. Wise
- Joel Barr
- Alfred Sarant
- Max Elitcher

== External sources ==
- Douglas Linder, A Trial Account (2001)
- John Earl Haynes and Harvey Klehr, Venona: Decoding Soviet Espionage in America, Yale University Press (1999), pg. 259, 347, 449. ISBN 0-300-07771-8.
- John Earl Haynes, "Cover Name, Cryptonym, CPUSA Party Name, Pseudonym, and Real Name Index. A Research Historian’s Working Reference" (revised February 2007), on the author's web site.
- Ronald Radosh and Joyce Milton, The Rosenberg File, New Haven: Yale University Press, 1997. ISBN 0-300-07205-8
- Katherine A. S. Sibley, Red Spies in America: Stolen Secrets and the Dawn of the Cold War, Wichita: University Press of Kansas, 2007. ISBN 0-700-61555-5
