= Raymond L. Wise =

American attorney

Raymond L. Wise was a 20th-century attorney and member of the board of the American Civil Liberties Union (ACLU). He served as attorney for William Perl, a friend of Julius Rosenberg and thus part of the Rosenberg Case on Soviet atomic espionage.

== Background ==
Wise was born in 1895 or 1896 in New York City. In 1916, he obtained a bachelor's degree from (then) Columbia College (now Columbia University) in 1916. In 1919, he obtained a law degree from Columbia University Law School.

== Career ==
He served as special assistant to the United States Attorney for the United States District Court for the Southern District of New York from 1921 to 1922. He then served as deputy assistant New York State attorney general, 1928–1929.

Wise served on the ACLU's board of directors from 1933 to 1951. During that time, he wrote in opposition of the Mundt-Nixon Bill of 1948 over the issue of "guilt by association" (see "Writings," below).

Wise was an attorney for William Perl in the Rosenberg Case (see next section below).

Wise was a member of the committee on professional ethics of the Florida bar from 1964 to 1968 and chairman of the committee on professional ethics of the Dade County Bar Association from 1962 to 1966.

== Defense of William Perl (Rosenberg Case) ==
Raymond L. Wise "of 80 Broad Street" was an attorney for William Perl, American physicist specializing in jet propulsion and supersonic flight – and Soviet spy in the Rosenberg Case, as documents in the FBI's online "Vault" show.

=== Pretrial ===
By August 29, 1950, Wise was advising Perl to cooperate. Perl appeared before the Rosenberg Grand Jury in the summer of 1950, denying any relationship to the Rosenberg spy ring. On March 10, 1951, Wise and Perl met with FBI agents; Wise stated that Perl had paid him a "substantial fee" as retainer. On March 15, 1951, Perl was arrested. In April 1951, FBI advised Wise that they would make no deal with Perl over a plea of perjury. Wise argued that the Government lacked jurisdiction to indict, to no avail. The Government delayed the trial in September 1951 due to Wise's illness. In June 1952, Wise asked for a reduction in bail from twenty to five thousand dollars; the judge reserved the decision. In December 1952, Wise asked for another deferral, as he would be in Florida for the winter; the judge decided to keep to resumption in February 1953. In March 1953, Wise again asked for deferral until after Wise's return from Florida on April 21, 1953, stating that Perl would otherwise ask for adjournment. On March 26, 1953, the Government agreed to resume on May 4, 1953. After his return in late April 1953, Wise "stated in strict confidence that he felt Perl should pleasd guilty and cooperate with Government in giving espionage into." By early May 1953, Wise reported that Perl remained unwilling to cooperate. On May 4, 1953, U.S. Judge Thomas Francis Murphy (government prosecutor in the Hiss Case) referred trial for instant case of perjury to Judge Sylvester J. Ryan of the United States District Court for the Southern District of New York, to commence on May 19, 1953, with Lloyd McMahon and Robert Martin prosecuting and Raymond L. Wise and Stanley Kanavek defending.

=== Trial ===
In court, the Government argued that Perl had knowingly lied that he knew Julius Rosenberg and Morton Sobell when they were all members of the Young Communists League or that he knew Helene Elitcher, Michael Sidorovich, or Anne Sidorvich. Wise argued that Perl did not lie intentionally. Perl could not explain how or whether Vivian Glassman had given him paper with Rosenberg's name on it because Perl had destroyed the paper. He could not explain why Sobell had used him as a job reference. Wise then argued that, earlier, Perl had appeared voluntarily when answering, not as a defendant and not under oath. On May 26, 1953, in his summation, Wise argued that Perl believed his answers true at the time he was answering. For instance, he answered truthfully that he did not "know" Sobell, as in "intimately," not whether he ever knew him at all. As for evidence from Helene Ellitcher, Wise argued that the court could only expect her to corroborate the testimony of her husband, Max Elitcher, a communist and known perjurer. Perl had no motive to perjure himself; Wise asked for acquittal on all four perjury charges. On May 22, 1953, Perl was found guilty on two counts of perjury for lying about his "acquaintance and association" with Rosenberg and Sobell (and acquitted of two other counts). Perl served two concurrent five-year sentences at the New York House of Detention.

== Personal life and death ==
Wise married Nadine Trope; they had two sons.

He was considered to be an "authority on legal ethics."

Later in life, he lived in North Miami.

On July 6, 1986, Wise died of heart failure at the Miami Heart Institute, age 91.

== Writings ==
In June 1948, he submitted a letter to The New York Times with a "careful study" of the provisions of the Mundt-Nixon Bill. Summarizing its spirit and intent, he wrote:

It is contrary to our fundamental theories of government to penalize or put pressure on expression of opinion or on free association in advance of personal criminal guilt, established after trial by due process of law. No political groups are singled out for special criminal laws. We do not recognize 'guilt by association.'

=== Articles ===
- "We Still Need a Bill of Rights," The Nation (1939)
- "The Mundt-Nixon Bill: Unconstitutionality of Pending Legislation is Charged," The New York Times (1948)
- "Veto Cannot Bar U.N. General Assembly from Establishing a Peacekeeping Force," ABA Journal (1965)
- "On World Disarmament," ABA Journal (1971)
- "Nixon Pardon," ABA Journal (1978)

=== Books ===
- Legal Ethics (1966)
- Order Please (1970)

== See also ==
- William Perl
- ACLU (1933–1951)
- Mundt-Nixon Bill (1948)

== External sources ==
- William Perl papers from FBI Vault (OCR)
- FBI Vault William Perl papers (no OCR)
