= Max Elitcher =

Witness in the Julius and Ethel Rosenburg trial

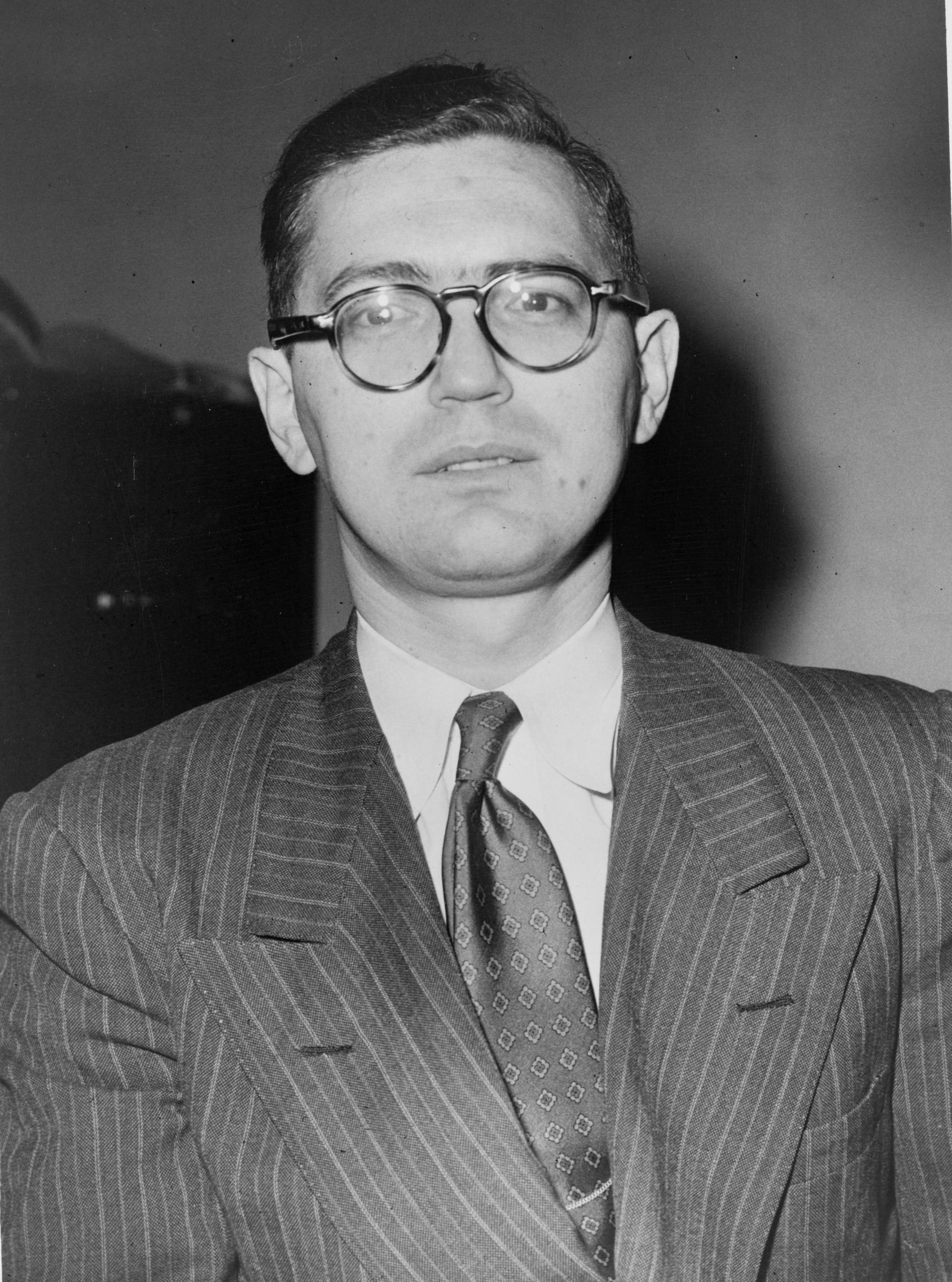
Max Elitcher in 1951

Max Elitcher (1918–2010) was a prosecution witness in the Julius and Ethel Rosenberg trial in 1951.

Because of his close friendship with Morton Sobell and Julius Rosenberg, as well as his damaging testimony, Max Elitcher was the most injurious prosecution witness in the Rosenberg case. Elitcher and Sobell became friends while attending Stuyvesant High School together. The two men attended the City College of New York where they met Julius Rosenberg. Following graduation, where Elitcher received a degree in engineering, he and Sobell moved to Washington to become junior engineers at the Bureau of Ordnance. The two remained close friends and even shared an apartment together. In 1948, Elitcher left government service to take a job at Reeves Instrument Corporation. Elitcher and his wife moved into a house in Queens. Their backyard neighbors were the Sobells.

Elitcher maintained that Julius Rosenberg had attempted to recruit him as a spy during the years 1944-1948. Although Elitcher shared many of Rosenberg's and Sobell's political beliefs, he claimed to have never passed secret information to either. Elitcher testified that he accompanied Sobell to Catherine Slip in New York, where Sobell passed film to Julius Rosenberg.

According to the authors of Invitation to an Inquest (1983): "At the trial, Elitcher had to be led frequently by Saypol as he told a story that was vague and improbable. He claimed that Rosenberg and also Sobell had on a number of occasions invited him to engage in espionage activities and that they had continued these requests sporadically over a four-year period - despite the fact that he never had turned over a single scrap of information to them." The New York Daily News reported: "Elitcher left trial observers with the impression that his must have been a masterpiece of equivocation and temporizing, since the first pressure was put to him in 1944... He was still resisting suggestions from Sobell and Rosenberg, he asserted... in 1948."

The only evidence against Morton Sobell was Elitcher's story about the visit to see Julius Rosenberg in July 1948, when he was living in Knickerbocker Village. He described the "35-millimeter film can" that Sobell was carrying but he admitted that he did not know what, if anything, the can contained, nor had he actually seen Sobell deliver it to Rosenberg. Elitcher was unable to say if Sobell gave Rosenberg any information that was secret. In 2008, Sobell publicly admitted to spying.

== Sources ==
Douglas Linder, A Trial Account (2001)
