= John Harvey (American actor) =

American actor (1917–1970)

- Harvey in Pin Up Girl (1944)
- Born: John Harvey Johnson, Jr. June 28, 1917; New Rockford, North Dakota, U.S.
- Died: December 25, 1970 (aged 53); New York City, U.S.
- Occupation: Actor
- Years active: 1940 to 1954
- Spouse: Judith Parrish (m. 1943) (1 child)

John Harvey (June 28, 1917 – December 25, 1970) was an American actor. He starred in stage plays in Los Angeles, then went to New York, where he portrayed Private Earhart in the hit comedy Kiss and Tell (1943) on Broadway.

With his success in the Earhart role, Harvey was signed to a motion picture contract by 20th Century Fox. He returned to the West Coast, where he appeared in Four Jills in a Jeep (1944) opposite Kay Francis and in Pin Up Girl (1944) opposite Betty Grable, with whom he was romantically teamed.

He continued his stage career, appearing in productions with his wife, actress Judith Parrish. He made television guest appearances in the late 1940s and early 1950s. He also starred as George Payne, with Parrish as his screwball wife, Laraine Payne, in the live television sitcom The Growing Paynes (1948/1949).

Harvey retired from acting in the early 1950s and became an actors' agent in New York, where he served on the national board of a television industry regulatory agency and as head of United Talent, Inc.

== Early life and career ==
He was born John Harvey Johnson Jr. in New Rockford, North Dakota, the son of John Harvey Johnson (February 10, 1882 – December 17, 1960) and Katherine Maddux (January 1895–February 6, 1955). His sister was Joyce H. Johnson (November 22, 1926–?), who was born in Los Angeles, California.

The family was living in New Rockford, when the 1920 census was enumerated, on January 23. His father worked in real estate and John Junior was two years and six months old. They moved to Southern California. When the 1930 census was enumerated, they were living in Inglewood, a suburb of Los Angeles, and 12-year-old John Junior was attending school. When the 1940 census was enumerated, on April 2, the Johnson family was living in Inglewood, at 425 East Hillcrest Street. His father's occupation was recorded as title examiner for a trust company, and 22-year-old John Harvey Johnson Jr., who was still single, had completed two years of college.

Using his first and middle names as his stage name, John Harvey began his career as a radio announcer. He began acting and performed in some 50 stage productions on the West Coast.

== White Cargo ==
In the drama White Cargo (1939) at the Beaux Arts Theatre, located at the corner of West 8th Street and Beacon Avenue in the Westlake area of Los Angeles, Harvey played the leading man role as Langford opposite Patricia Saunders (c. 1922–?) as the sultry siren Tondeleyo. Her portrayal of primitive passions in the African jungles of the rubber country garnered a lot of attention. Harvey's performance as Langford was also notable. The Los Angeles Times of June 4, 1940, stated, "John Harvey is sincere and type perfect as the young hero." Harvey and Saunders were both replacements in the production, which was a big success and played its 365th performance on August 5, 1940, marking its first year run and setting a milestone in local theatrical history by smashing a 16-year record for legitimate stage productions. It outlasted all other stage attractions and smashed every existing attendance record for a show of its type in Los Angeles.

Though extremely popular, White Cargo had a reputation as a "steamy production." There was a scene where Tondeleyo was onstage topless. On the night of December 19, 1940, the LAPD's "purity squad" led a raid on the theatre. They closed the play and arrested the cast and the producer, William D. Swanson (1907–1983), on charges of presenting an indecent show. They believed that the semi-nudity and the sensuous writhing of Tondeleyo was obscene.

During the trial, a "command" performance of White Cargo was given at the Beaux Arts on Tuesday, January 22, 1941, for the judge and jury. They sat silently as the cast enacted the play and Tondeleyo, as portrayed by Saunders, "worked her sensuous wiles on every white man in the cast."

That same day in Municipal Court, Harvey testified and gave the reason why Tondeleyo writhed the way she had during the performance of December 19. "In several of the scenes," he explained, "I grasped Tondeleyo's wrists so tightly that she writhed in pain attempting to escape me." The Deputy City Attorney asked, "And that is the reason for her wriggling?" "It is," Harvey replied, adding that he "didn't actually hurt her." The defendants all asserted that the command performance was identical with almost 600 previous performances.

Swanson, Saunders and Harvey were found guilty on January 23, 1941, while the others were acquitted. In early June, the convictions were upheld by the Superior Court. Harvey and Saunders were each fined $250. Swanson was fined $500 and sentenced to 180 days in jail.

While the trial was in progress, Harvey was cast in the juvenile lead in the Collison and Hopwood farce Getting Gertie's Garter (1941) at the Musart Theatre, 1320 South Figueroa Street, in Los Angeles, opposite Rae Whitney in the title role.

Harvey moved to New York and made his debut on Broadway, where he appeared in two plays.

== Broadway ==
Harvey performed in the ensemble cast of the melodrama Johnny 2 X 4 (1942) at the Longacre Theatre, which included Lauren Bacall, who was credited as Betty Bacall. He was then cast in the role as Private Earhart in the F. Hugh Herbert comedy Kiss and Tell (1943) at the Biltmore Theatre, a big success that was produced and directed by George Abbott and included Richard Widmark in the cast.

On March 12, 1943, Harvey and actress Judith Parrish, who played Mildred Pringle in Kiss and Tell, were married at the courthouse in Roxbury, Massachusetts, while in Boston for the pre-Broadway engagement, which was announced in the New York Times on March 24. They had one child, Johanna Harvey Johnson (born February 6, 1944, in Los Angeles).

With his success in the Earhart role, Harvey was signed to a motion picture contract by 20th Century Fox. After the Saturday night performance of Kiss and Tell, June 12, 1943, he and his wife, Parrish, left the cast and he returned to California.

== Motion pictures ==
At 20th Century Fox, Harvey played the role as Ted Warren in the musical/romance Four Jills in a Jeep (1944) opposite Kay Francis, Carole Landis, Martha Raye and Mitzi Mayfair, who played themselves in a re-enactment of the four actresses USO tour of Europe and North Africa during World War II. He also played the role as a naval hero, Tommy Dooley, opposite Betty Grable in the musical/romance Pin Up Girl (1944), in which he woos and wins the blonde star.

He and Parrish then co-starred in the stage farce Petticoat Fever (1944) at the Musart Theatre in Los Angeles. Tickets for the comedy/romance went on sale on September 5, and the show opened on September 12. Harvey's role was as the radio operator, Dascom Dinsmore, who rescues crash victims, roles headed by Parrish and Arthur Gould-Porter, after their plane goes down in the cold wastes of Labrador.

The Los Angeles Times of October 14, 1944, ran a piece titled Two Showings, which reads, "Petticoat Fever, now in its fifth week with John Harvey and Judith Parrish in the starring roles, will be presented at a matinee performance tomorrow in addition to the evening show at the Musart Theater." Another Times article, of October 15, is titled Harvey Gains Status of Idol, and reads:

"John Harvey, the Dascom Dinsmore of the comedy hit, "Petticoat Fever," at the Musart Theater, is becoming something of a matinee idol to feminine playgoers.

Harvey is experienced on both stage and screen. He appeared 108 weeks in Manhattan in the footlight farce, "Kiss and Tell," later coming to Hollywood and 20th Century-Fox."

When Petticoat Fever closed, Harvey played the role as Burns in the 20th Century Fox crime/mystery The Spider (1945), a rehash of the plot from The Maltese Falcon, opposite Richard Conte and Faye Marlowe. He then received his release from the studio.

== Television ==
Besides stage and screen work, Harvey made his debut television appearance in WNBT's comedy TV movie The First Year (1946). He then made another appearance on the Broadway stage in the role as Glenn Stewart in a brief run of the comedy Open House (1947) at the Cort Theatre, with Mary Boland. He played the role as Adam in a TV episode of The Chevrolet Tele-Theatre (1948), which was titled Whistle, Daughter, Whistle.

Harvey and Parrish starred as insurance salesman George Payne and his screwball wife, Laraine Payne, in the DuMont Television Network's domestic sitcom The Growing Paynes during the 1948/1949 season. They left the series in 1949 and were replaced by another Mr. and Mrs. Payne.

Also in 1949, Harvey made guest appearances in the NBC Presents episode A Husband's Rights and the Kraft Television Theatre episode Little Brown Jug. He appeared in the role as Terry Cook in the Martin Kane, Private Eye episode A Jockey Is Murdered (1951) and appeared in the Robert Montgomery Presents episode Eva? Caroline? (1952).

== Later career ==
Harvey was one of the first actors to experience the need for a television union. In 1949, he suggested that the 4A's create the Television Authority (TvA), a regulatory agency with representation from all seven unions. He was elected to the national board of TvA and served as chairman of its wages and working-conditions committee and its agents committee.

He became an actors' agent in 1954. In 1964, he began serving as treasurer of Theatrical Artists Representatives, a group of agents affiliated with Actors' Equity. Harvey was head of United Talent, Inc., at the time of his death. He and Parrish, who also worked as an agent at United Talent, lived at 11 Riverside Drive in New York City.

John Harvey died at age 53 of an apparent heart attack on Christmas Day, 1970, in New York.
