= Clarence Hathaway =

American journalist (1892–1963)

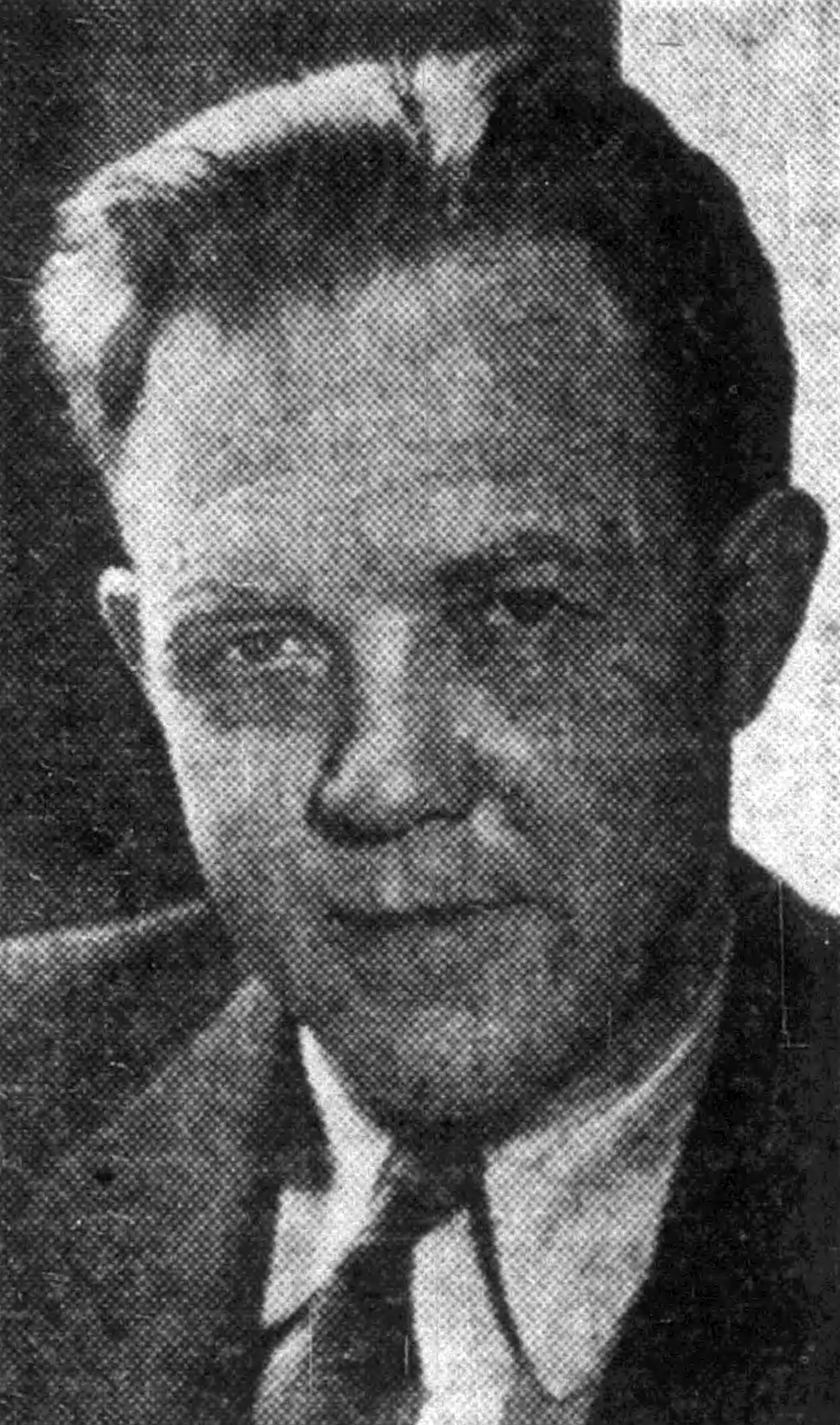
Hathaway c. 1940

Clarence A. "Charlie" Hathaway (January 8, 1892 – January 23, 1963) was an activist in the Minnesota trade union movement and a prominent leader of the Communist Party of the United States from the 1920s through the early 1940s. He is best remembered as the party's leading organizer of the Federated Farmer-Labor Party in 1923 and 1924, as the editor of The Daily Worker (1933–1940), and as a longtime member of the Communist Party's governing Central Committee. He was also a longtime informant for the FBI.

== Biography ==
=== Early years ===
Clarence Albert Hathaway, known to his friends as "Charlie," was born January 8, 1892, in St. Paul, Minnesota, the son of a carpenter. Hathaway was of mixed English and Swedish ethnic origin.

He attended public school in Minnesota, attending three years of high school in the town of Hastings. Hathaway left school to apprentice as a machinist in 1911, working as a tool-and-die maker in both the United States and Scotland for over a decade.

In 1913 Hathaway joined the International Association of Machinists (IAM). His activity in the union was cut short in 1915 by his departure for Scotland, from which he returned in 1916. It was during this wartime experience in Great Britain that Hathaway was converted to Socialism.

Upon his return, Hathaway became very active in the IAM, working in the local and district office before being elected secretary of the Michigan district of the IAM for 1920 and 1921. In 1922 he was made the business agent for the IAM for its district 77, working in that capacity until 1924.

In 1922 the 30-year-old Hathaway also enrolled at the St. Paul Labor College, where he studied mechanical engineering.

Hathaway was elected vice president of the Minnesota Federation of Labor in 1923.

Historian Harvey Klehr has characterized Hathaway as having been an "outgoing, friendly man, a former semi-pro baseball player not adverse to having several drinks." Doyen of historians of American communism Theodore Draper said of Hathaway, "his personality was gay, warm, and slightly unstable."

=== Political career ===
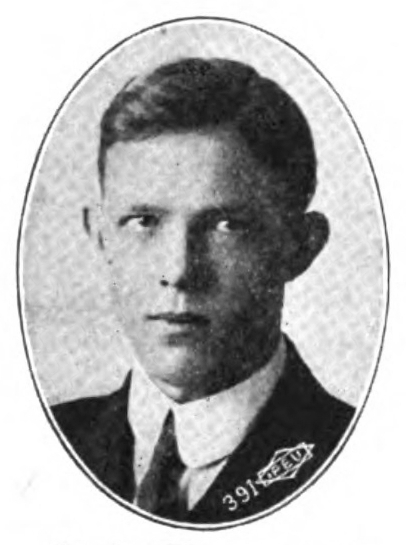
Hathaway c. 1925

Clarence Hathaway was an active member of the Socialist Party of America and was elected a delegate of the Socialist Party of Minnesota to the 1919 Emergency National Convention of the SPA. Along with the rest of the Minnesota delegation, Hathaway was denied his seat on a technicality by the convention's credentials committee, and Hathaway and his comrades bolted the gathering.

Moving to a rival convention down the street, Hathaway became a founding member of the Communist Party in 1919. He was also instrumental in helping to organize the Farmer-Labor Party of Michigan in 1920, serving on the first State Committee of that organization. During this interval he remained an active participant in the communist movement.

Hathaway attended the "Unity Convention of Communist Parties" at the Overlook Mountain Hotel in Woodstock, NY, for a four-day meeting in May 1921. There was an FBI informant present who reported that Moscow sent $50,000 to the American Communists with orders to stop quarreling and unite. Historian Tim Weiner says that FBI documents declassified in 2011 suggest the informant was Hathaway.

Hathaway was elected a delegate to the 3rd National Convention of the Workers Party of America from Minnesota, held December 30, 1923, to January 2, 1924, in Chicago.

Hathaway played a key role serving on the committee of arrangements for the Farmer-Labor Party's 1924 St. Paul convention, which convened June 17, 1924, and gave birth to a new Federated Farmer-Labor Party, sponsored by the Communist Party USA as one of its mass organizations. The gathering named him the secretary of the national Federated Farmer-Labor Party, a position in which he served until dissolution of the organization late in that same year.

During the heated factional battles of the middle 1920s, Hathaway was a member of the factional group headed by William Z. Foster and Alexander Bittelman. Later he became a loyal supporter of Earl Browder, a relationship which lead Hathaway into assumption of a rapid succession of important party jobs. In July 1924 Hathaway was named the Communist Party's district organizer for the important Chicago district.

In 1926, Hathaway was sent to Moscow by the CPUSA as a student in the first class of the new International Lenin School for party activists which had just been established there. Joining Hathaway was former Socialist Party youth leader William F. Kruse and Chicago party leader Charles Krumbein. Hathaway remained at the Lenin School until 1928.

While in Moscow, Hathaway attended the 6th World Congress of the Communist International as a non-voting advisory delegate. It was there that American Communist Party factional leader James P. Cannon was won over to the ideas of the Left Opposition to the Russian Communist Party, headed by Leon Trotsky. It seems likely that during this interval Cannon spoke with his old acquaintance about these prohibited ideas.

Upon his return to America, Hathaway was quickly reintegrated into the top ranks of the CPUSA's leadership. Hathaway had the necessary party rank as well as the inside information which enabled him to become the chief person on the Central Committee accusing James P. Cannon of Trotskyism and factional activity, charges which ultimately led to Cannon's expulsion.

Hathaway was also returned as district organizer in Chicago.

Early in 1929 Hathaway was named the editor of the monthly magazine of the Trade Union Unity League, Labor Unity. Hathaway was later moved to New York where he became district organizer for the New York district. In July 1933 he was later made an editor of The Daily Worker, the CPUSA's official newspaper. He recruited Marguerite Young as Washington bureau chief for the newspaper.

Hathaway was three times a nominee of the Communist Party for the U.S. House of Representatives, running in the 7th District of New York in 1930, the 3rd District of New York in 1932, and the 7th District again in 1934.

=== 1931 Yokinen Show Trial ===
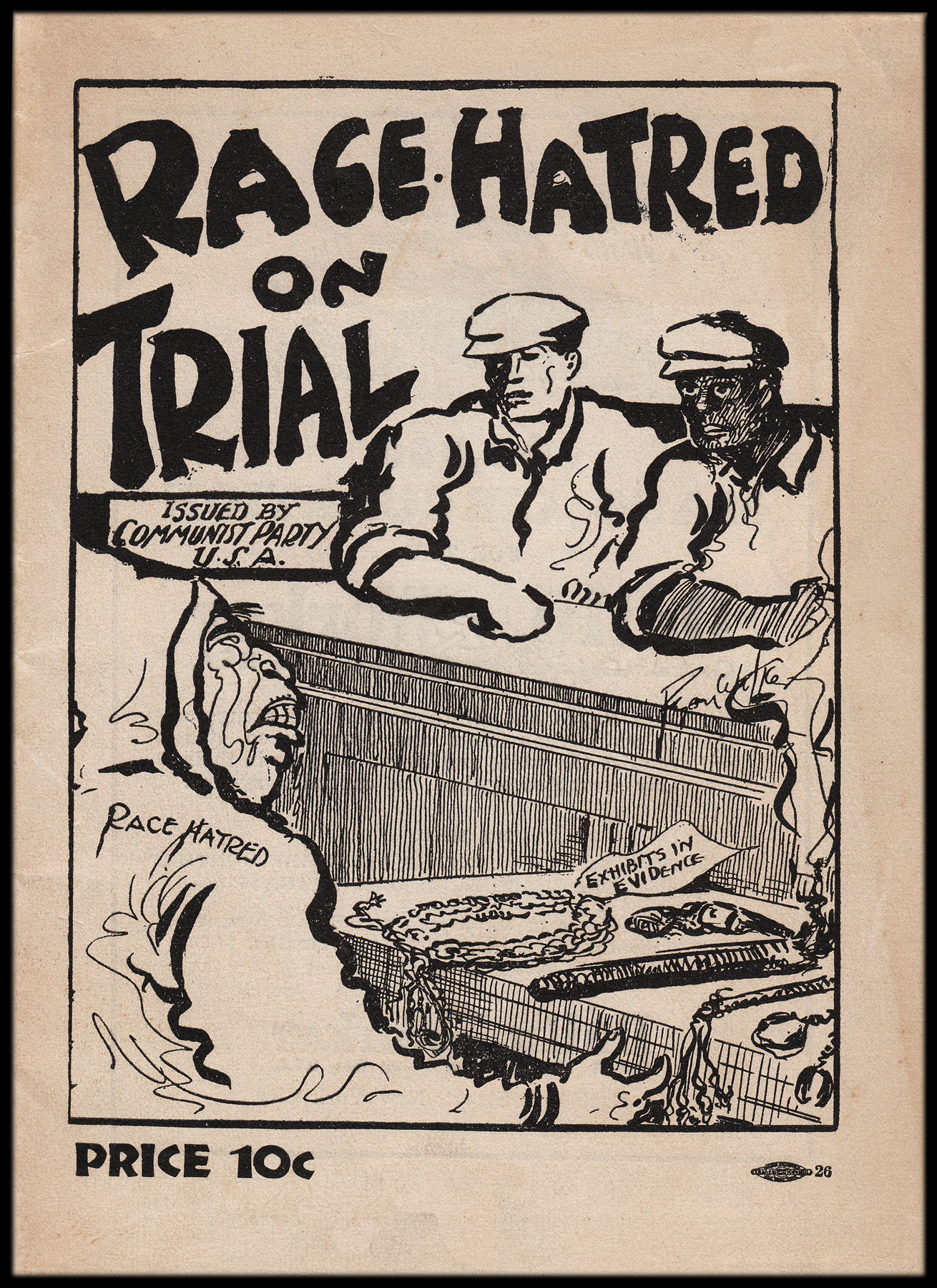
Cover of the pamphlet produced by the Communist Party to publicize the Yokinen "trial." (Art by Ryan Walker.)

In 1931 Hathaway was selected by the party to serve as the "prosecutor" of a janitor at the Finnish Workers Club in Harlem who belonged to the Communist Party in a public event remembered as the Yokinen Show Trial. The janitor, August Yokinen, was accused of having rudely threatened three black attendees of a party-sponsored dance — an action which undercut the party's professed support of social equality. Richard Moore, one of the party's top black leaders, was assigned to speak in Yokinen's defense. A Soviet-style show trial was held on March 1, 1931, in front of an audience of 1,500 — a gathering which included 211 delegates from 113 different "mass and fraternal organizations" associated with the Communist Party.

Neither side presented witnesses. Hathaway called for Yokinen's expulsion from the party for "acting as a phonograph of the capitalists," while Moore blamed the "vile, corrupt, oppressive system" of capitalism for the defendant's undisputed transgressions. The jurors expelled Yokinen from the party and instructed him to participate in the struggle against "white chauvinism" if he wished to be readmitted in the future. The object lesson taught, the gathering sang The Internationale and disbursed, with the proceedings of the show trial subsequently published in pamphlet form for a broader audience.

=== February 1934 riot ===
Hathaway's place as a top leader of the Communist Party was further illuminated on February 15, 1934, when he shared the platform with CPUSA General Secretary Earl Browder and former vice presidential candidate James Ford in speaking before 8,000 people at a meeting held at the Bronx Coliseum attempting to drum up support for a broad coalition to fight against the spread of fascism.

The following day, Hathaway was involved in a riot in New York City which erupted when 5,000 Communists marched to a rally held under the auspices of the Socialist Party of America in support of the Socialist Party of Austria, at the time the object of violent repression at the hands of right wing Austrian nationalists. Incensed that the Socialists had invited Matthew Woll of the American Federation of Labor and Mayor Fiorello LaGuardia as speakers, the assembled Communists chanted and booed in an attempt to disrupt the meeting.

When Hathaway came to the podium as David Dubinsky was finishing speaking, several members of the audience jumped on the Daily Worker editor and began beating him with fists and chairs before picking him up and forcibly throwing him over a railing off the platform. Fights broke out throughout the arena, chairs were flung from balconies, and the New York Police Department rushed in to restore order. When chairman of the meeting Algernon Lee attempted to read a resolution in condemnation of the actions of the Dollfuss government in Austria, Communists in the audience began to chant "We Want Hathaway!" to interrupt him. The national radio broadcast of the Socialists aimed at condemning the right wing takeover in Austria was reduced to an embarrassing debacle.

=== From leadership to expulsion ===
With Earl Browder and other Communist Party leaders off in Moscow for consultations in December 1937, Clarence Hathaway remained as a top party leader. On February 18, 1938, at an expanded meeting of the party's governing Central Committee called the Party Builders Congress, Hathaway was entrusted to give the keynote report in Browder's absence. It was Hathaway who officially broke the news to other top leaders that the party's new tactical objective would no longer be a Popular Front of all progressive forces against the fascist movement, but rather an even-broader "Democratic Front," making alliance with anti-fascist members of the bourgeoisie, previously considered anathema by the Communists.

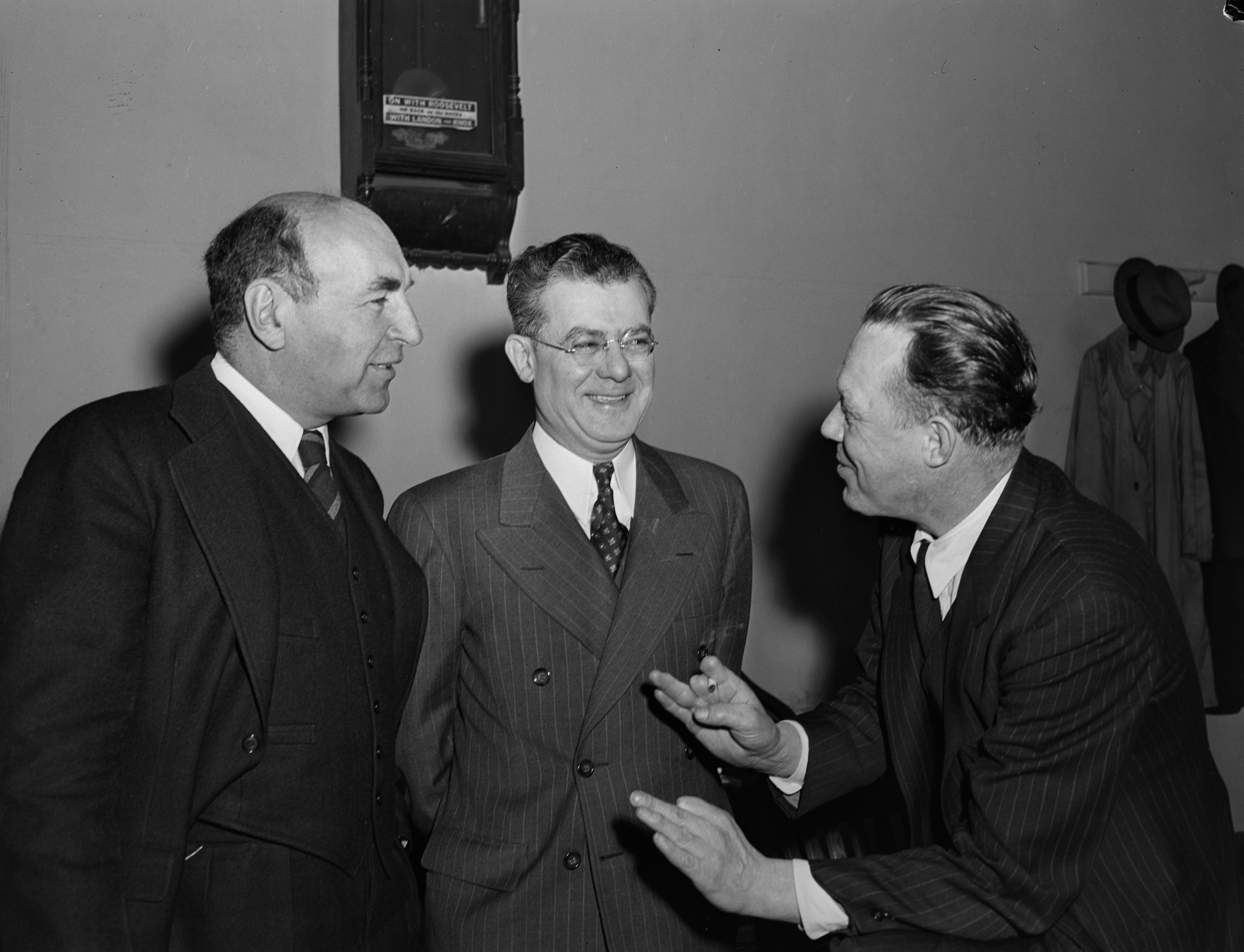
Hathaway (right) confers with his attorneys, Osmond Fraenkel (left) and Edward Kuntz (center), in General Sessions Court, April 12, 1940

In 1940 Hathaway served a brief jail term owing to a conviction of the Daily Worker of criminal libel. Hathaway was expelled from the party in October 1940, charged with drunkenness, after which he issued a statement calling his expulsion "justifiable", adding that it was "made necessary by my failure to live up to the exacting personal standards demanded by the party of its leadership." Following his expulsion, Hathaway returned to St. Paul, Minnesota, where he worked once again as a machinist.

=== Union organizer ===
During the 1940s, Hathaway went to work as a union organizer on behalf of the United Electrical, Radio and Machine Workers of America (UE), part of the Congress of Industrial Organizations.

His drinking problem resolved, Hathaway was readmitted to the Communist Party late in the 1940s, once again rising to a leadership position, being named chairman of the CPUSA's New York district in the late 1950s. In 1960 Hathaway was elected to the governing National Committee of the party.

During the process of his vetting for the National Committee in February 1960, however, objections were raised in Moscow by the Communist Party of the Soviet Union, which cited material in its personnel records alleging that Hathaway had been an employee of a detective agency from 1918 to 1920 as well as having been in contact with Federal Bureau of Investigation employees in 1941 in Pittsburgh and 1947 in San Francisco. Although this information came to the attention of American Communist Party leaders too late for his removal without provoking a crisis in the New York organization, Hathaway was soon shunted out of power, ostensibly for reasons of health.

=== Death and legacy ===
Clarence Hathaway died on January 23, 1963. He is interred at Fairhaven Cemetery in Stearns County, just outside the township of Fair Haven, Minnesota.

Hathaway's papers, consisting of 21 published articles and speeches in one archival box, are held at the library of the Minnesota Historical Society at St. Paul.

== Works ==
- Race Hatred on Trial. With Richard Moore (unsigned). New York: Workers Library Publishers, 1931.
- Who are the Friends of the Negro People? New York: Communist Party National Campaign Committee/Workers Library Publishers, 1932.
- Communists in the Textile Strike: An Answer to Gorman, Green and Co. New York: Central Committee of the US, 1934.
- Why a Workers' Daily Press? With Sam Don. New York: Workers Library Publishers, n.d. [c. 1934].
- The People vs. the Supreme Court. New York: Workers Library Publishers, 1937.
- Collective Security: The Road to Peace. New York: Workers Library Publishers, 1938. —Radio speech of December 22, 1937.
- The Communist Position on the Negro Question. With Earl Browder and Harry Haywood. New York: Workers Library Publishers, n.d. [c. 1940].

== See also ==
- Farmer–Labor Party (United States)
