= Calling All Stars =

Calling All Stars may refer to:

- Calling All Stars (1934 musical), a Broadway musical
- Calling All Stars (1937 musical), a British musical film
