= Marguerite Young (journalist) =

American journalist

- Born: Marguerite Keller; 1905
- Died: 1995 (aged 89–90)
- Education: Louisiana State University
- Occupations: Writer, journalist, memoirist
- Spouse: Seymour Waldman? (divorced)
- Writing career
- Years active: 1928–?
- Movement: Communist (CPUSA)

Marguerite Young (1905 – 1995) was an American journalist of the early 20th-century, best known for her Communist Party affiliation, specifically as the Washington bureau chief of the Daily Worker who facilitated the introduction between Soviet spy Hede Massing and American recruit Noel Field. She also knew Alger Hiss. After two years with that newspaper, the CPUSA secretary general and newspaper's editor fired her. During World War II and at least to 1950, she worked for the New York Herald-Tribune.

== Background ==
Marguerite Young was born Marguerite Keller in 1905, one of two girls and five children. She grew up in the French Quarter of New Orleans. She graduated from Louisiana State University, where she edited the humor magazine The Purple Pel, and was a member of the Chi Omega sorority.

== Career ==
=== Associated Press ===
Associated Press logo

Young wrote for the Baton Rouge State-Times and New Orleans Item-Tribune before she was hired for Associated Press in November, 1928. In late 1928 or early 1929, just before President Herbert Hoover's inauguration of March 4, Young arrived in Washington, DC, with a letter of introduction from her editor at the New Orleans Item-Tribune. According to the Ruston Daily Leader, Young had arrived in Washington from New Orleans with Seymour Waldman.

Kent Cooper, head of the Associated Press, had hired her among a pool of the newswire's first-ever women reporters. Over the next 18 months, she worked under editors, including Byron Price, Clarke Salmon, and Jim Williams.

Her coverage included the Mixed Claims Commission (Germany and United States) and the U.S. Public Health Service.

She also covered the Washington society scandal involving Dolly Curtis Gann, wife of attorney Edward Everett Gann and sister of U.S. Vice President Charles Curtis. Secretary Henry L. Stimson stood by the State Department's protocol that seated women with lesser honor than men in a manner contrary to official rank. At the time, Mrs. Gann was serving as hostess for her brother the vice president, and they both insisted that she receive the honor due to the vice president's wife. Alice Roosevelt Longworth, wife of House speaker Nicholas Longworth and daughter of former U.S. President Theodore Roosevelt, responded publicly by refusing to attend gatherings where she might be afforded honors lower than Mrs. Gann.

=== New York World-Telegram ===
Investigative journalist Paul Y. Anderson, associated with The Nation magazine, recommended to Young that she leave AP to get a byline at a newspaper." "In July 1932, I resigned from the Associated Press... went to work ... for the Scripps-Howard newspaper chain's show-piece, The World Telegram as a star reporter with my by-line featured five days a week." Soon, however, she found the newspaper too "reactionary" for her "radical" ideas. At the time, she was also studying Marxism (see Ware Group for a Marxist study group of the same period).

=== Daily Worker ===
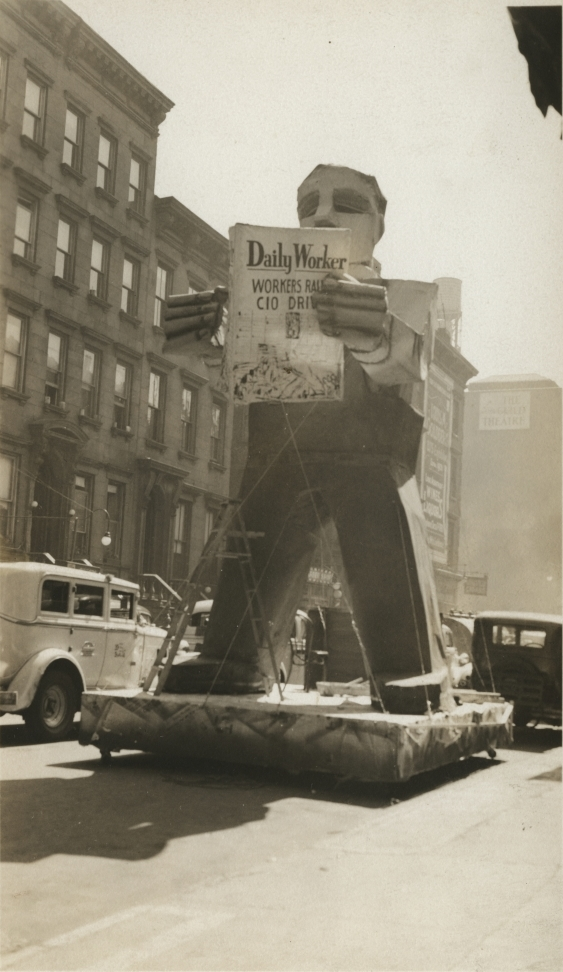
May Day parade float with statue reading the Daily Worker

"On January 6, 1934, I quit The World-Telegram and returned to Washington to write daily dispatches for the Communist newspaper, The Daily Worker. Her motivation to join the Daily Worker appears twice in a repeated, center-page headline, in bold:

HITLER SEIZES PRUSSIA

Editor Clarence Hathaway lured her over to the newspaper.

She reported a visit of CPUSA secretary general Earl Browder, who used her office as a base before going to Capitol Hill for meetings. "I'm going to meet with a study group in the House," he tells her. Marxist writer James Farrell also used her office as a base when visiting from New York City. Such events were relatively normal back then, she recalls: "This was the United Front, as it was called here in the United States. Joseph Stalin launched a similar moment and called it the Popular Front and Popular Front it was called in Spain... and People's Front." She also met CPUSA leaders Jack Stachel and Herbert Benjamin.

Young first considered resigning from the Daily Worker when Hathaway ran a piece of hers he had assigned, then published a retraction of it the next day. "I telephoned Clarence Hathaway. He was sorry, very, very sorry. That was all... I had never encountered anything like this when I had worked for the 'bourgeois' press."

The New Militant, the newspaper of the short-lived, Trotskyist Workers Party of the United States, cited Young's reportage for the Daily Worker in an article called "Partners in Social-Patriotic Betrayal."

==== Noel Field ====
In 1934, Young's name appears in connection with Soviet spies Hede Massing and Noel Field: "Mrs. Massing claims that the introduction to Field was arranged through Marguerite Young, the Washington, D. C., correspondent for the Daily Worker," a fact cited by numerous studies on Noel Field.

Hede Massing stated during testimony:

Mr. Morris: What was your first case? Mrs. Massing: Noel H. Field.... I had met (him) through the recommendation of Helen Black (an owner of Sovfoto), Marguerite Young. Marguerite Young in 1933 and probably some years thereafter was a Daily Worker correspondent in Washington. I am sure many of the newspapermen present here will know her. She was a young and very intelligent Communist, and it was she who was my contact, not officially, because I was not seen with her, of course, but I saw her privately and socially and it was she who would point out people to me that she knew and thought would be interesting to me. She gave me a whole list of them. To some she introduced me. To Noel Field she introduced me... Marguerite Young knew people who had read this part of the book (by husband Paul Massing) and who were interested to meet the wife of the man who had written this book. Field was one of them. She said I should meet Field, I would like him, his wife was German, and I might find him very interesting. Indeed I did.

==== New Deal setbacks ====
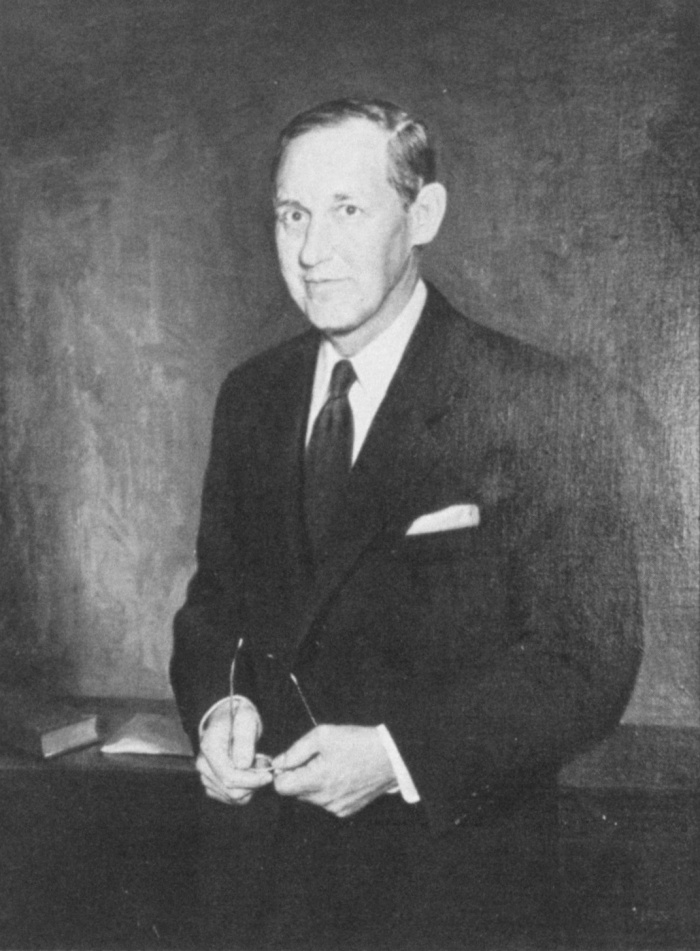
Harry Hopkins

Young remained on staff throughout 1935. She met John L. Lewis, whom she described as a "principal force pushed Franklin D. Roosevelt left." She noted the dismissal of Brain Trust member Rexford Tugwell and the rise of younger New Deal figures Thomas Corcoran and Benjamin W. Cohen. She noted a conflict on the "left" of FDR and how Harry Hopkins seemed to thrive in the discord—reported by the New York Times as having said, "We'll tax and tax and spend and spend and elect and elect." She filed three stories with the Daily Worker on Smedley D. Butler: three weeks later, HUAC announced that Butler had received an offer to command a "Fascist" army to overthrow the government (which he had declined).

Also in 1935, she notes with apprehension the U.S. Supreme Court's "knocking down" of the Agricultural Adjustment Administration and the National Recovery Administration – the latter supported by congressmen Robert F. Wagner, George W. Norris, and Fiorello H. La Guardia. She covered the Nye Committee hearings and notes that Alger Hiss was serving as legal counsel. She met Hiss: "...stepping over to a staff table and asking for and examining documents in the hands of the Committee's bony, intense, little chief aide who would become a mastery man of the twentieth century–Alger Hiss." She covered the Social Security Act hearings. As a Louisiana native, she made particular note of the assassination of the state's U.S. Senator Huey Long: she was personally acquainted with his assassin, Dr. Carl Weiss.

==== William E. Dodd ====
Further in 1935, U.S. ambassador to Germany, William E. Dodd, personally described to her Young publication FDR's lack of support for him. She notes that Dodd met her because she already knew his daughter, Martha Dodd, who was (unbeknownst to her father) a Soviet spy. She writes of Martha "his daughter, whom I'd met and liked, an attractive young woman, light yellow hair, large black velvet bow at the nape of her neck." Ambassador Dodd reported to Young that his anger because the State Department had no "secure communications" or meetings: "he could not make an appointment to meet privately with anyone in Berlin, even members of his staff, without its becoming known instantly... both his critics and his supports knew what he was doing before he told them. Young filed the story–and it never appeared in print. She traveled to New York and met directly with Earl Browder. The only explanation that Browder offered was "'You know that we are supporting Franklin D. Roosevelt'...He just looked very solemn, implacable, and pious, pious, pious."

==== Firing ====
In 1936, the Daily Worker fired Young. Clarence Hathaway had delivered the news. Hathaway and Browder felt that "I no longer fitted their strategy and tactics–just as they had in effect dumped William E. Dodd, U.S. ambassador to Germany and world-renowned historian!"

=== New Masses ===
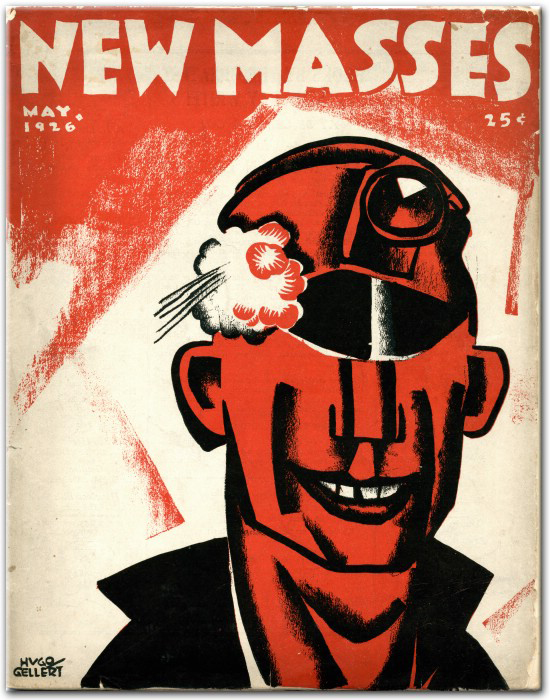
New Masses cover of May 1926 by Hugo Gellert.

In 1934, Herman Michaelson, an editor at the New Masses and former editor of the New York World offered Young to have her write stories for the New Masses. She traveled to Pittsburgh, where she stayed with Harvey O'Connor and wife Jesse Lloyd (daughter of progressive muckraking journalist Henry Demarest Lloyd), and wrote on steel workers. She also appeared in a 1934 publicity photo depicting "Some Writers and Editors of the New Masses" that included Josephine Herbst, Ella Winter, and Anna Rochester.

In 1936, after the Daily Worker fired her, the New Masses picked her up. Judging by the dates of her aritlces for the magazine, the firing occurred in the summer of 1936, as her articles suddenly proliferate as of August 1936 and continue with some regularity into 1938.

Robert Minor asked her to ghost write a book by Viola Ilma (which must refer to Ilma's second book of 1938 entitled A Political Virgin, as her first book And Now, Youth! had already come out in 1934).

=== Odd jobs ===
There is a gap in Young's memoirs from 1936 to 1939. From articles she published in the New Masses, it seems she worked there from summers 1936 to 1938, with a final article in tribute to friend Paul Y. Anderson in December 1938. (See "Work - Articles" sub-section, below.)

The memoir of Hope Hale Davis recounts that, as of September 1937, a Soviet agent called "Young" began to visit her Washington, DC, apartment to files.

By 1939, it seems from her memoirs that Young was working in the press office of the Ford Motor Company, as she was taking assignments for Fred Black (formerly of The Dearborn Independent) and George Pierrot, both closely associated with Henry Ford. She worked with Black for the New York World's Fair for two periods: February 18–October 29, 1939, and May 4–November 1, 1940. During that period, she lived in Dearborn, Michigan.

After work for Ford, from 1940 to 1941, Young took jobs with the Salvation Army and Macy's. Then, she took over a job from radio personality "Martha Deane" (Mary Margaret McBride, whom Young refers to first as "Marian Young" and then "Martha Dean") at a Scripps-Howard syndicate that she call "National Enterprise Association" or NEA.

=== New York Herald-Tribune ===
Around June 1942, Young joined the staff of the New York Herald-Tribune through editor L.L. Engelking and with the approval of owner Helen Rogers Reid, both of whom knew her–and of her time at the Daily Worker. She worked with old friend and journalist Emma Bugbee and editors Everett Walker and Joseph Fels Barnes (former staffer at the Institute of Pacific Relations 1932–1934), while friend Ellinore Herrick (formerly chair of the National Labor Relations Board) headed personnel.

==== Alger Hiss case ====
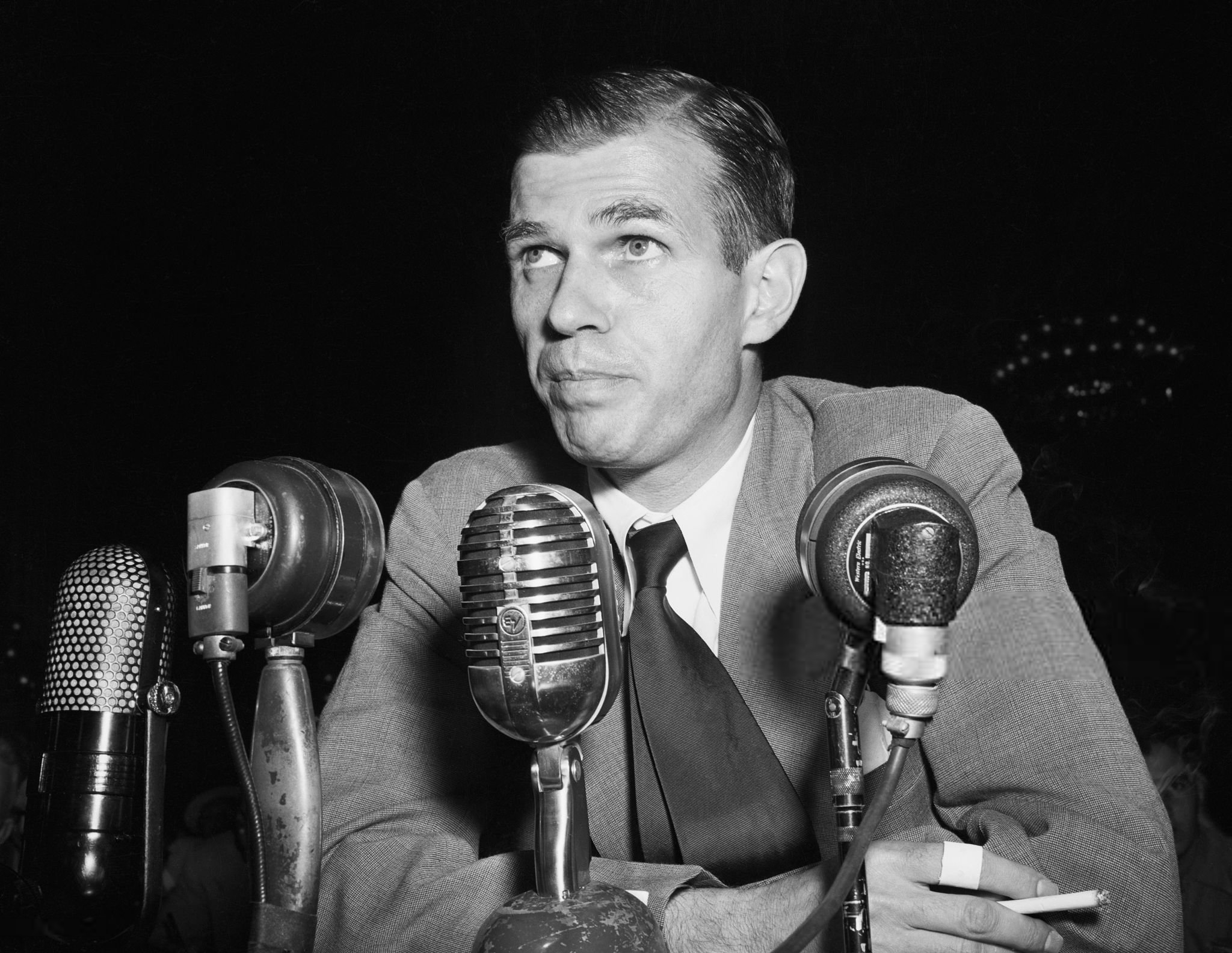
Alger Hiss.

In 1948, Bert Andrews, Washington bureau chief for the Herald-Tribune, interviewed Young about Alger Hiss when the case broke. She informed him that she had known Hiss only during the six weeks she covered the Nye Committee hearings. She told him:

Alger Hiss, the chief counsel, seemed to be shaping the line of questioning. He appeared every morning carrying volumes and volumes and volumes of documents. I saw how fast and skillfully he made his case, sending memos to the chair–a thoroughly self-possessed man with an authoritative demeanor–and he had plenty of ammunition."...But I wanted to stay out of the Hiss controversy.

Regarding Whittaker Chambers, Young stated:

I would feel conscience-bound to read Whittaker Chambers' book Witness... (it) would pass muster. I would smell nothing. I would see nothing in it that struck as not true.

Regarding Alger Hiss, Young stated:

I had not seen or heard Alger Hiss say anything I thought was an evident falsehood.

In sum, she stated:

I tended to rely on Chambers' words because he put it on the table–in print–where thousands of readers could read it and examine it and take it apart, and it stood up. When Alger Hiss later would be convicted of perjury, I would look back to that little man's face and figure and movements and think, if he did it, he did it deliberately, not by any slip of the tongue or accident. For the main I had watched for six weeks had made no unity or hasty or slipshod or slippery remark.

Ultimately, however, Young concluded simply:

I did not know (who was guilty).

== Personal life and death ==
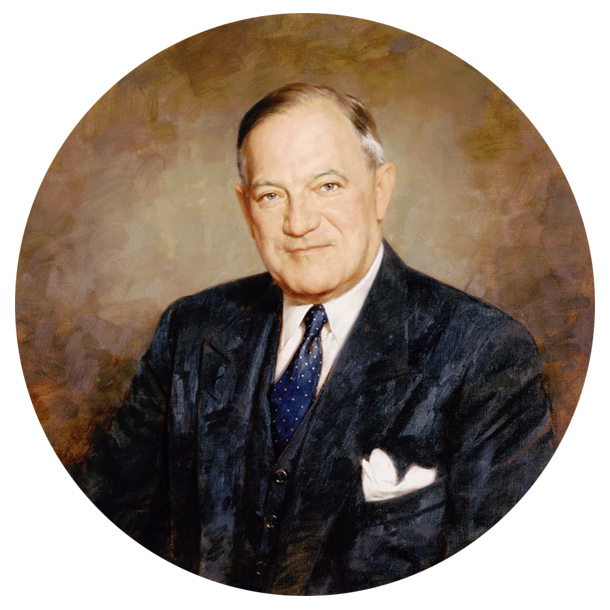
Robert F. Wagner.

During 1931 and 1932, Young served as president of the Washington, D.C., chapter of the Association for Women in Communications.

Young's roommate was Martha Dalrymple. Colleagues and acquaintances included: Bess Furman Armstrong, Barbara Giles, Harold Brayman of the New York Post, Harvey O'Connor, Jesse Lloyd O'Connor, U.S. Representative Maury Maverick, and TASS reporter Kenneth Durant. She calls National Labor Relations Board chair Ellinore Herrick a friend, as well as long-time CPUSA official Robert Minor and his wife Lydia Gibson. Soviet American spy Martha Dodd was another friend.

Young was an old friend of the wife of writer Robert Cantwell, which is why he visited Young at the Daily Worker in Washington during an April 1934 visit with Whittaker Chambers.

Correspondence with Young appears in the papers of Joseph Freeman, a New Masses editor.

Young dated Robert F. Wagner, U.S. senator from New York.

Recent studies on Noel Field show Young was married to Seymour Waldman, who in the mid-1930s was a contributor to the New Masses. Further, they state that she was a friend of CPUSA secretary Earl Browder. (Young and Waldman were known to Joseph Freeman, some-time managing editor of the New Masses.) In her memoir, Young studiously avoids mention of any "husband"–until, suddenly, she moves back to New York City to work for the New Masses and happens to mention her desire to divorce: "I asked the lawyer, could I be divorced from a young man I'd married some four years earlier."

=== Communism ===
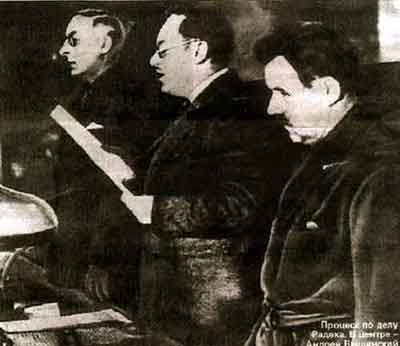
Prosecutor General Vyshinskiy (centre), reading the 1937 indictment against Karl Radek during the 2nd Moscow Trial.

Young's memoir Nothing but the Truth makes no mention of Communism until a third through, when she suddenly reports her recommendation to U.S. Senator David A. Reed (Rep-PA) of a book to read: "'Why–the Communist Manifesto of 1848 by Karl Marx and Friedrich Engels. That's obvious,' I said." The memoir is also very weak on dates until about the time Young joined the Daily Worker, at which point it becomes very specific about dates.

She summarized her views on Communism as follows:

I knew how to tell Adam Smith and Karl Marx apart. I'd found out in economics 1-2-3 and in the world the deepest criticism of the classical economics of Adam Smith and of modern capitalism was the owners and managers skimmed the cream. They stole the value of workingman's labor and called it profit, but it was in fact surplus value, hence the whole system was not just unfair but mildness and one day it would collapse of its own bloated with. I did not agree at all. I rather bothered at seeing that what Clarence Hathaway had called the Communist Party's "short term program" often in practice did not differ much from the "long term program."

She was a signatory of a public statement on the Moscow Trials "together with such notorious Communists and Communist fellow travelers fellow travelers as Haakon M. Chevalier, Jack Conroy, Malcolm Cowley, Kyle Crichton, Lester Cole, Jerome Davis (sociologist), Muriel Draper, Guy Endore, Elizabeth Gurley Flynn, Jules Garfield, Robert Gessner, Michael Gold, William Gropper, Harrison George, Dashiell Hammett, Clarence Hathaway, Lillian Hellman, Langston Hughes, V. J. Jerome, H. S. Kraft, John Howard Lawson, Corliss Lamont, Melvin Levy, Albert Maltz, A. B. Magil, Bruce Minton, Moissaye J. Olgin, Samuel Ornitz, Dorothy Parker, Paul Peters, Holland D. Roberts, Paul Romaine, Morris U. Schappes, Edwin Seaver, George Seldes, George Sklar, Lionel Stander, Maxwell S. Stewart, Paul Strand, Anna Louise Strong, John Stuart, Genevieve Taggard, Max Weber" (the source is unclear but probably in 1936 or 1937).

== Confusion with Marguerite Vivian Young ==
Several sources have mistaken Young with the contemporary novelist Marguerite Vivian Young (1908–1994). In 2012, literature professor Alan M. Wald wrote "one cannot entirely rule out that this Marguerite Young is the same well-known Marguerite Young (1908–1994) who authored Miss Macintosh, My Darling (1965) and who also wrote on utopian socialism and Eugene V. Debs", but noted that all biographical material place the latter in Chicago and Indianapolis during the period the former was based in Washington D.C. and New York.

The original source of the confusion appears to be the 1995 book An Unsentimental Education: Writers and Chicago, which attributes the Marguerite Keller Young's memoir Nothing But the Truth to novelist Marguerite Vivian Young. In 2000, the error reappeared in American Women Writers: A Critical Reference Guide from Colonial Times to the Present (Gale Group Inc., 2000) and then appeared online in Encyclopedia.com.

== Legacy ==
Her name appears in publications as one of the first American women journalists of note.

Historian Alan M. Wald notes that Young was one of several women who "became more visible in editorial and staff roles." He includes her with Barbara Giles and Ruth McKenney.

== Works ==
=== Books ===
Only two works in her name appear in the Library of Congress catalog:

- Where is There Another? A Memorial to Paul Y. Anderson with Freda Kirchwey et al. (1939)
- Nothing but the Truth (1993)

The memoir starts with her arrival in Washington, DC, in late 1928 or early 1929 and ends with mention of her reading of Whittaker Chambers' memoir Witness (published in May 1952).

=== Articles ===
American Mercury

- "Frances Perkins: Liberal Politician" (August 1934)

New Masses:

- "Rose Pastor Stokes" (June 1933)
- "Whose Congress?" (January 2, 1934)
- "The Little Poison Flower" (February 27, 1934)
- "Senator Nye Shadow-Boxes War" (October 9, 1934)
- "Washington – Jim-Crow Capital" (May 21, 1935)
- "Congressman Amlie Sees Red" (August 13, 1935)
- "The Guild Cracks Down" (December 17, 1935)
- "Is the U.S.A. Preparing?" (March 10, 1936)
- "Mr. Roper Sees the Seamen" (May 5, 1936)
- "Elephant into Fox" (Jun 16, 1936)
- "The Cleveland Plot," (June 22, 1936)
- "Where is the G.O.P.?" (June 23, 1936)
- "Jim Farley's Festival" (June 30, 1936)
- "Roosevelt's Convention" (July 7, 1936)
- "Steel Gets Hot" (July 21, 1936)
- "Steel-Town Politics" (July 28, 1936)
- "Steel's G.O.P. Vigilantes" (August 4, 1936)
- "Weirton: 'Feudal Domain'" (August 11, 1936)
- "Steel's Frankenstein Monster" (August 25, 1936)
- "Sex in the Cit Room" (October 20, 1936)
- "Terre Haute: Second Round" (November 3, 1936)
- "The Champion of the Gorilla" (January 12, 1934)
- "Is the Democratic Party Splitting?" (June 29, 1937)
- "New Hope for the New Deal" (February 1, 1938)
- "Washington Watches the Depression" (March 15, 1938)
- "Machine Politics and Relief" (April 12, 1938)
- "The Great Debate: Which Way to Peace?" (May 3, 1938)
- "Washington Weighs La Folette" (May 31, 1938)
- "We Popped in on Garner" (June 21, 1938)
- "Whose Politics in Relief?" (June 28, 1938)
- "Ickes on Self-Defense" (July 26, 1938)
- "Paul Y. Anderson" (December 21, 1938)

== See also ==
- Noel Field
- Hede Massing
- Alger Hiss
- Daily Worker
- Clarence Hathaway
- William E. Dodd
- Martha Dodd
- Marguerite Young (contemporary novelist)
