= Paul Y. Anderson =

American journalist (1893–1938)

- Born: August 29, 1893; Knoxville, Tennessee
- Died: December 6, 1938 (aged 45)
- Occupation: Journalist
- Awards: Pulitzer Prize (1929)

Paul Y. Anderson (August 29, 1893 – December 6, 1938) was an American journalist. He was a pioneering muckraker and played a role in exposing the Teapot Dome scandalof the 1920s. His coverage included the 1917 race riots in East St. Louis and the Scopes Trial. In 1929, he received a Pulitzer Prize.

== Background ==
Anderson was born in Knoxville, Tennessee, to William and Elizabeth Anderson on August 29, 1893. He was the only son among the three of six children who survived infancy. When he was three, his father, a stonecutter, was killed when a faulty derrick fell on him in a quarry. Edmund Lambeth, believed the death of Anderson's father generated “much of the energy that was later to be channeled into long hours of investigative reporting.”

His mother was a South Knoxville school teacher. When Anderson was old enough, he helped support his family by delivering newspapers and telegrams.

== Career ==
=== Knoxville ===
In 1911, Anderson, then 17, was hired as a reporter for the Knoxville Journal.

=== St. Louis ===
His demonstrated ability resulted in his move to the St. Louis Times in 1912 and the St. Louis Star in 1913. In 1914, Anderson married Beatrice Wright of East St. Louis, and that year, he came to work at the St. Louis Post-Dispatch. Although he enrolled in some correspondence courses during his career, Anderson never obtained a college degree. The Post Dispatch published his stories for the next 23 years.

When he arrived at the Post Dispatch, Anderson was supervised by the managing editor, O.K. Bovard. On his first assignment, he exposed official corruption in East St. Louis. Due to this, his wife received threatening telephone calls from gamblers and police.

Anderson first came to national attention in 1917 when a congressional committee investigated the East St. Louis Race Riots. As a reporter covering East St. Louis for the Post Dispatch, Anderson was one of many newspaper reporters called to testify. In its report to the House of Representatives, the committee singled out Anderson for praise. Anderson, the committee said, "reported what he saw without fear of consequences; defied the indignant officials whom he charged with criminal neglect of duty; ran the daily risk of assassination, and rendered invaluable public service by his exposures."

Anderson also undertook a successful campaign to release those prisoners who were imprisoned for various alleged offenses in the course of World War I. "When the Post-Dispatch, in 1923, launched its crusade to get freedom for the political prisoners who had been run into jail by government Cossacks [federal and state prosecutors], it was Anderson who performed the fieldwork. When he was through firing, the political prisoners were out of jail, and the first national crusade of the Post Dispatch had become a triumph."

=== Washington ===
In 1923, after two years as an editorial writer, Anderson could not persuade the Post-Dispatch to send him to Washington D.C., so he resigned and went to the capitol as a freelance reporter. His early work on the Teapot Dome Scandal disclosed that Secretary of the Interior Albert Fall had accepted a bribe of $230,000 to lease oil lands in Teapot Dome, Wyoming, and Elk Hills, California, to branches of Standard Oil. His performance convinced Bovard to rehire him in 1924. In that same year, he was sent to Chicago to cover the trial of Nathan Leopold and Richard Loeb, both 19, who had abducted and murdered 14-year-old Bobby Franks. Loeb and Leopold were both the sons of very wealthy families. In 1925, he was sent to Dayton, Tennessee, to cover the Scopes "Monkey Trial," where public school teacher John Scopes was put on trial for teaching evolution. As a result of these assignments, Anderson became friends with prominent people such as Clarence Darrow and H.L. Mencken.

In 1925, Anderson contributed to an investigation which led to the resignation of Federal Judge George W. English, and in 1926, he debunked an AP story that stated that the socialist government of Mexico was attempting to "establish a "Bolshevik hegemony" between the US and the Panama Canal." Finding no evidence for the charge, Anderson wrote a story identifying the source of the story, which was a State Department official. The official quickly retracted the charge.

H. L. Mencken wrote in his 1926 essay "The South Looks Ahead", published in the American Mercury, that Anderson was, "the best newspaper reporter…that the South has produced in my time.”

Anderson remarried in 1928. His second wife was Anna Fritschie of St. Louis. In 1928, Bovard also asked Anderson to look into what had happened to the other $2,770,000 in Liberty Bonds that had not been given to Secretary of the Interior Fall as a bribe. If $230,000 in bonds had been used to bribe Fall, would the remaining $3,000,000 in bonds be used to bribe others? When the Coolidge Administration refused to reopen the investigation, Anderson prevailed upon his friend, Republican Senator George Norris, to introduce a resolution in the Senate to reopen the investigation. The resolution passed unanimously.

As a result of the ensuing congressional investigation and government prosecutions, Robert W. Stewart, head of Standard Oil of Indiana, was indicted for contempt of the Senate and perjury. Although acquitted in both cases, he was later removed from his job. Oil magnate Harry Sinclair and Secretary Fall were jailed. Stewart and James O'Neil, another principal in the scandal, later made restitution. The government eventually recovered $6,000,000. Anderson received the Pulitzer Prize in 1929 for his efforts in reopening the investigation.

In 1929, Anderson began writing for the Nation Magazine. He reported on the efforts of power companies to stop government development of power in Muscle Shoals, Alabama. He referred to Herbert Hoover as "The Great White Feather" and expressed admiration for the populism of Louisiana governor Huey Long. When the Great Depression hit, he embraced the National Recovery Act, stating, "There is a very serious question about whether we can end this depression before revolution breaks out. When ten million men have been without work for three years and are asking themselves whether they will ever work again when they have seen their women fade. Their babies wither and die, when they have seen their boys turn to thievery and their girls to prostitution, it strikes me as a poor time to play dilettante over the classical ideas of Jeffersonian democracy."

In 1932, Anderson recommended that Marguerite Young take a job with the New York World-Telegram, which she did. (The following year, she left for The Daily Worker, after which she introduced Soviet spy Hede Massing to American diplomat Noel Field.)

When the demands of his occupation pressed heavily upon him, Anderson began to drink heavily. His attempts and those of the Post Dispatch to help him curb his drinking were ultimately unsuccessful. He was hospitalized at Johns Hopkins in 1933 and 1934. On October 9, 1933, he received a get-well letter from then-President Franklin D. Roosevelt. A column in The Nation entitled "Amenities from a hospital pallet" was written for Anderson on March 7, 1934. In 1936, he divorced his second wife.

In 1937, Anderson seemed to regain his old touch when he won the Headliners' Club Award for exposing and authenticating the suppressed Paramount newsreel, which showed the killing of ten workers by police patrolling the struck Republic Steel Plant near Chicago. On August 30, 1937, Anderson married actress and radio personality Katherine Lane but they soon separated. In January 1938, Anderson was dismissed by the Post-Dispatch for prolonged absences and inattention to his job. He was quickly hired by the St. Louis Star-Times for its Washington Bureau.

In October, he took a foray into radio and denounced the conduct of Martin Dies, Chairman of the House Un-American Activities Committee.

Anderson became increasingly despondent. One of his last columns was about the Munich Agreement in October 1938.

== Personal life and death ==
In 1914, Anderson married Beatrice Wright of East St. Louis. They had two sons, Paul Webster and Kenneth Paine. They divorced in 1919, and he remarried in 1928 with Anna Fritschie. Anderson divorced again in 1936 and married Katherine Lane the following year.

On December 6, 1938, he took an overdose of sleeping pills, leaving behind a note saying his "usefulness was at an end."

At his funeral, eulogies were delivered by his friends, Senator George W. Norris of Nebraska, Congress of Industrial Organizations president John L. Lewis, and George R. Holmes, chief of the International News Service Bureau in Washington.

One of his pallbearers was an old friend, now Associate Justice of the Supreme Court, Hugo Black.

After serving in World War II, Paul and Kenneth moved to Southern California. Paul pursued a career as a brick mason. He and his wife, Margaret, had no children. Kenneth went to work in the aerospace industry and became president of a small company that made airplanes fasteners and rivets. He and his wife Irma had five children: Kenneth Jr. (1944–2004), John (1947), Katherine (1948), Paula (1949–2008), and Douglas (1951). Paul Y. Anderson is survived by four great-grandsons and one great-granddaughter.

== Legacy ==
At his funeral, Norris said his death was "a loss that will be felt generations to come, because he passed away when the world needs more than ever the fighters for the under privileged and the victims of the abuse of power by those who control our economic life.”

Anderson's role as a pioneering muckraker is viewed as a key figure who laid the groundwork for investigative journalism.

== Works ==
Friends published a collection of Anderson's works and their essays about him.

- Where is There Another? A Memorial to Paul Y. Anderson with Freda Kirchwey et al. (1939)

== External sources ==
- Edmund B. Lambeth, University of Kentucky, Paul Y. Anderson from Dictionary of Literary Biography 2005–2006.
- St. Louis Journalism Review, July- August 2008.
- Paul Y. Anderson, The Nation, August 7, 1937.
- Lillian Elkin, Journalism Quarterly, Fall 1982.
