= Caught (1949 film) =

1949 film by Max Ophüls

- Theatrical release poster
- Directed by: Max Ophüls
- Screenplay by: Arthur Laurents
- Based on: the novel Wild Calendar by Libbie Block
- Produced by: Wolfgang Reinhardt
- Starring: James Mason; Barbara Bel Geddes; Robert Ryan; Curt Bois; Art Smith; Natalie Schafer
- Cinematography: Lee Garmes
- Edited by: Robert Parrish
- Music by: Frederick Hollander
- Production company: Enterprise
- Distributed by: Metro-Goldwyn-Mayer
- Release date: February 17, 1949 (New York)
- Running time: 88 minutes
- Country: United States
- Language: English
- Box office: $776,000

Caught is a 1949 American melodrama and film noir directed by Max Ophüls, and starring James Mason, Barbara Bel Geddes and Robert Ryan. Caught was based on a novel by Libbie Block.

== Plot ==
Charm school graduate and model Leonora Eames, who has always dreamed of being rich, foolishly marries a deranged multimillionaire named Smith Ohlrig. Ohlrig has not married for love but in an act of defiance after his psychiatrist tells him he does not think he will marry. The psychiatrist predicts that the marriage will ruin both of them. Ohlrig has a heart condition, but the psychiatrist tells Ohlrig that this condition is psychosomatic.

After the marriage, Ohlrig abuses Eames: mentally, by isolating her, criticizing her, exhibiting furious, unjustified jealousy, and expecting her to stay up late to be available when he comes home. His flunky, Franzi Kartos, participates in this. When Ohlrig tells her to go away on vacation she tells him she will leave and get a job. “You'll be back,” he says. She leaves the room, and he has an attack. He takes a pill and it stops.

Penniless, Leonora leaves Ohlrig and finds work with an obstetrician, Dr. Hoffman, and a pediatrician, Dr. Larry Quinada, who have a partnership in a poor neighborhood. After some severe criticism from Dr. Quinada, she learns to do a good job. He feels he has seen her before, but he cannot place where.

Ohlrig comes to Leonora's apartment and promises a new start, the honeymoon they never had. The next morning, at the Long Island house, she learns that the long-planned trip is for business. Seeing through him at last, she returns to work at the doctors' office.

She goes to Hoffman, suspecting correctly that she became pregnant during the one-night reconciliation. He promises not to tell Quinada, although he believes he would understand.

Leonora and Quinada go out and have a wonderful time, and he proposes. She says she wants to marry him, but must straighten something out. She disappears, only telling her landlady she is moving to Long Island. Quinada eventually finds her at the Ohlrig home.

Ohlrig reveals that they are married. Quinada, who has now realized he had seen news of the marriage in newspapers and that is why she is familiar to him, leaves, only to be stopped by Leonora. She explains that she is pregnant. She came back to Ohlrig to give the child the security that only money can bring. Quinada wants to marry her and tells her that after three minutes with Ohlrig he knows he is dangerous and will ruin the child. That she should know by now that money doesn't mean security. Ohlrig finds them. He questions the paternity of the baby but uses the child to force Leonora to stay with him. He threatens to keep the baby, suing for divorce and naming Quinada as co-respondent. He reveals that he never loved her and hates himself for marrying her. She begs him not to take her baby.

Excerpts from gossip columns from April to October follow the course of Leonora's pregnancy and the rumors of her husband's mistreatment of her. He has been depriving her of sleep, waking her up at all hours of the night by calling or coming to the house and taking her out. Kartos can take no more and quits; he would rather go back to being a head waiter.

Ohlrig has an attack of angina and Leonora refuses to help him. Thinking she has caused his death, she calls Quinada for help. When he arrives, the house is filled with medical personnel and equipment tending to Ohrig. Leonora collapses and Quinada rushes her to the hospital. In the ambulance he reassures her that Ohlrig is in perfect health. Dr. Hoffman delivers the baby, which is too premature to survive. Leonora is well and Ohlrig no longer has any leverage over her. Dr. Hoffman allows Quinada two minutes with her.

A nurse brings Leonora's mink coat to the room. Dr. Hoffman tells her that if his diagnosis is correct Leonora won’t want it.

== Cast ==
- James Mason as Dr. Larry Quinada, a pediatrician, partner with Dr. Hoffman.
- Barbara Bel Geddes as Leonora Eames
- Robert Ryan as Smith Ohlrig
- Frank Ferguson as Dr. Hoffman, an obstetrician
- Curt Bois as Franzi Kartos
- Natalie Schafer as Dorothy Dale
- Art Smith as Psychiatrist
- Jimmy Hawkins as Kevin (uncredited)

== Release ==
According to MGM records the film earned $511,000 in the US and Canada and $265,000 overseas.

== Reception ==
Contemporary reviews were negative, with most criticism going toward the script. Bosley Crowther of The New York Times called it "a very low-grade dime-store romance, expensively rendered on film". Variety wrote although the performances are topnotch, the story fails to lift it above romantic pulp fiction. Harrison's Reports wrote: "Handsome production values have been wasted on a complicated, unpleasant story that is a curious hodge-podge of romance and psychological melodrama ... It is an odd picture, impressive in many respects and 'corny' in others, but on the whole too contrived and implausible." John McCarten of The New Yorker wrote that while the main cast were all "first rate actors," none of their roles were "worth a moment's envy," because "the script presents us with a full quota of standard Hollywood paper-backed characters, who move around, for the most part, against stage sets about as stimulating as scenes drawn in soap on a barroom mirror."

Recent appraisals have been more positive. Rotten Tomatoes, a review aggregator, reports that 100% of eight surveyed critics gave the film a positive review; the average rating is 8.4/10. In modern reviews, J. Hoberman of The New York Times wrote, "The filmmaking is brilliant in part because, like Bel Geddes's deceptively modest performance, it is so apparently unassuming." Anthony Lane of The New Yorker called it a masterwork and wrote that Ohlrig is "a barely concealed portrait of Howard Hughes". Ignatiy Vishnevetsky of The A.V. Club called it "Ophüls' best non-period film". Chuck Bowen of Slant Magazine wrote that it is not as good as Ophüls' later masterpieces, but it "offers a damning portrait of middle-class American society as a large and merciless snare."
