= Pin Up Girl (film) =

1944 film by H. Bruce Humberstone

- Theatrical poster
- Directed by: H. Bruce Humberstone
- Screenplay by: Robert Ellis; Helen Logan; Earl Baldwin
- Based on: Imagine Us! 1942 Good Housekeeping by Libbie Block
- Produced by: William LeBaron
- Starring: Betty Grable; John Harvey; Martha Raye; Joe E. Brown
- Cinematography: Ernest Palmer
- Edited by: Robert L. Simpson
- Music by: James V. Monaco
- Distributed by: 20th Century Fox
- Release date: April 25, 1944
- Running time: 84 minutes
- Country: United States
- Language: English
- Box office: $2 million

Pin Up Girl is a 1944 American Technicolor musical romantic comedy motion picture starring Betty Grable, John Harvey, Martha Raye, and Joe E. Brown.

Directed by H. Bruce Humberstone and produced by William LeBaron, the screenplay was adapted by Robert Ellis, Helen Logan and Earl Baldwin based on a short story titled Imagine Us! (1942) by Libbie Block.

Pin Up Girl capitalized on Grable's iconic pin-up status during World War II, even using her famous swimsuit photo in portions of the movie.

== Plot ==
Lorry Jones is working as a hostess at the local USO canteen in "Missoula, Missouri," where she performs as a singer and signs photographs of herself for adoring soldiers.

It is her job to keep them happy and routinely accept every marriage proposal. One of her suitors, Marine Sergeant George Davis, does not realize she has no real intention of marrying him.

Meanwhile, Lorry and her best friend, Kay Pritchett, have accepted jobs as stenographers in Washington, D.C., but they tell the soldiers that they are going on a USO tour.

The night before leaving for Washington, D.C., they go out partying in New York City. Upon arriving in the city by train, they are welcomed by Navy hero Tommy Dooley, who fought at the Battle of Guadalcanal.

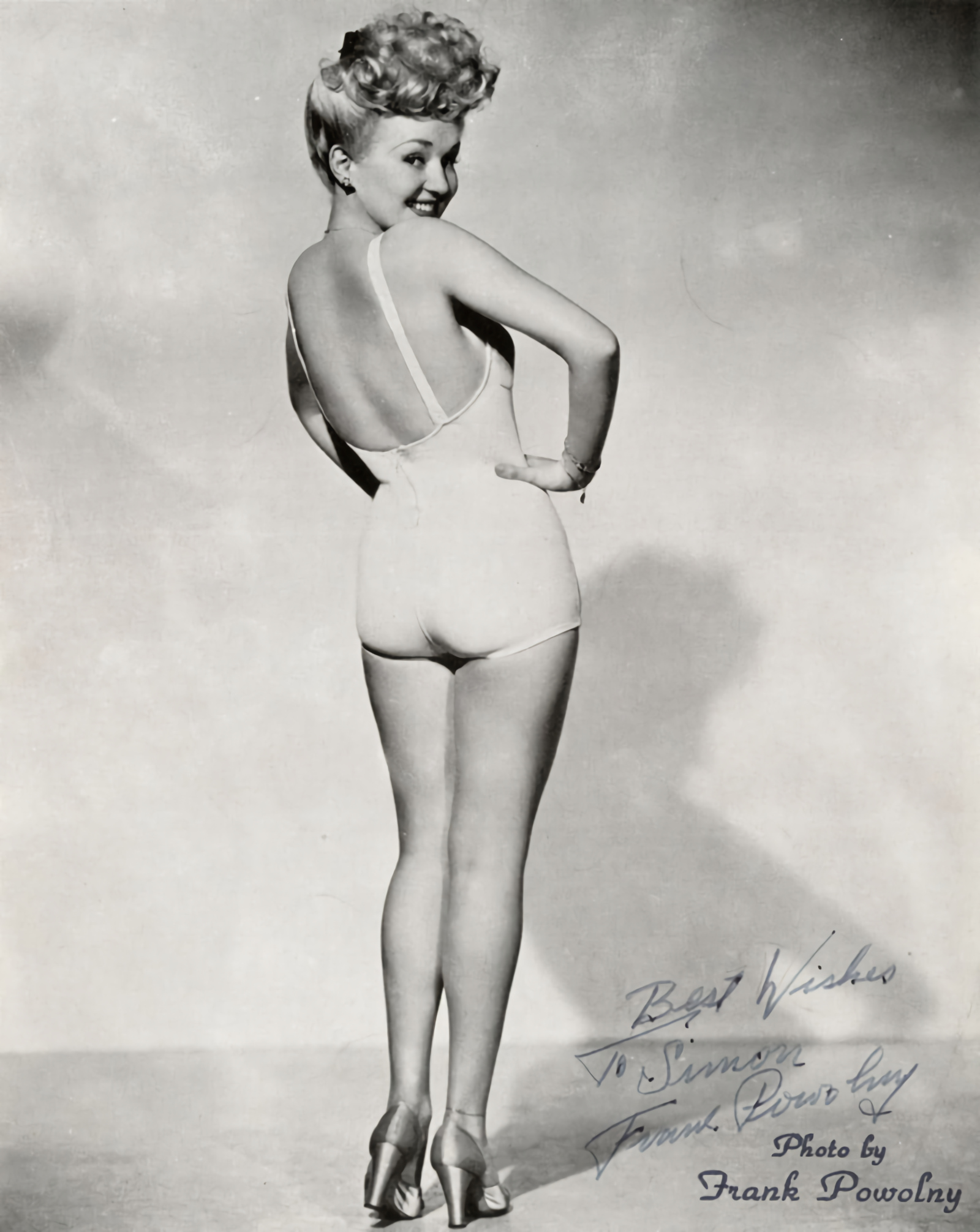
Betty Grable pin-up.

That night, they try to get into the Club Chartreuse, but are not allowed to go in without escorts. Lorry does not want to leave and tells the lie that she is meeting Tommy and his friend, Dud Miller, in the club. She is not aware that Tommy is the best friend of Eddie Hall, the club's owner. When Eddie is told that Lorry and Kay are escorts of Tommy, he lavishes them with champagne.

When Tommy and Dud arrive, Tommy thinks Eddie has set them up in blind dates with the girls. Dud believes the two women are actresses. Before Tommy can prove Dud wrong, Kay drunkenly tells them she and Lorry are in the Broadway musical Remember Me.

Molly McKay, star singer at the club, does not believe Kay, until Lorry, telling everyone her name is Laura Lorraine, performs a song without trouble. Lorry and Kay eventually spend their night dancing with Tommy and Dud and leave for Washington the next morning. The men lose the women's address by accident. Two weeks later, Lorry and Kay are insulted with not having heard from their beaus.

Meanwhile, Lorry is bored with her life as a stenographer, until Tommy and Dud surprisingly show up in Washington. Lorry is assigned as his stenographer, but does not want him to find out her real career. She decides to disguise herself, so he will not recognize her as Laura.

Lorry sets up a date between Tommy and "Laura." At their date, Tommy tells her he loves dating an actress. She is hurt and tells him she is going to give up her stage life. Tommy responds by offering her a job at Eddie's club. Molly is jealous when she finds out, but sees an opportunity to get rid of her when George comes to town and recognizes her as Lorry. She introduces George to Tommy, who is insulted when he hears the truth. When Lorry finds out what has happened, she tells George she has no intention of marrying him.

Laura then dresses as stenographer Lorry and visits Tommy to beg him to give "Laura" another chance. Things do not go her way, however, so she reveals that she is both Lorry and Laura. Tommy eventually forgives her.

== Cast ==
- Betty Grable as Lorry Jones/Laura Lorraine
- John Harvey as Tommy Dooley
- Martha Raye as Molly McKay
- Joe E. Brown as Eddie Hall
- Eugene Pallette as Barney Briggs
- Dorothea Kent as Kay Pritchett
- Dave Willock as Dud Miller
- Charlie Spivak as Himself (bandleader)
- Roger Clark as Marine Sgt. George Davis (uncredited)
- Nat 'King' Cole as Canteen Pianist
- Hermes Pan as Apache Dancer
- Adele Jergens as Canteen Worker
- Bess Flowers as Arriving Club Diplomacy Patron
- June Hutton as June Hutton - Singer with Spivak Band
- Reed Hadley as Radio Announcer (voice)
- Lillian Porter as Cigarette Girl

== Production and release ==
In October 1942, Linda Darnell and Don Ameche were set to star. However, it was decided the movie would be made as a musical, thereby replacing Darnell by musical actress Betty Grable. She was seven months pregnant when the movie was completed.

When Pin Up Girl was released, it received mixed reviews from critics. Variety wrote: "This is one of those escapist filmusicals which makes no pretenses at ultra-realism, and if you get into the mood fast that it's something to occupy your attention for an hour and a half. It's all very pleasing and pleasant." The New York Times criticized the script, stating it was a "spiritless blob of a musical." However, it praised Grable.

== Soundtracks ==
- You're My Little Pin Up Girl
  - Music by James V. Monaco
  - Lyrics by Mack Gordon
  - Sung by chorus, uncredited players, and Betty Grable
  - Danced by the Condos Brothers
- Time Alone Will Tell
  - Music by James V. Monaco
  - Lyrics by Mack Gordon
  - Sung by June Hutton and The Stardusters with Charlie Spivak and His Orchestra
- Red Robins, Bobwhites and Bluebirds
  - Music by James V. Monaco
  - Lyrics by Mack Gordon
  - Performed by Martha Raye
  - Danced by Gloria Nord and the Skating Vanities
- Don't Carry Tales out of School
  - Music by James V. Monaco
  - Lyrics by Mack Gordon
  - Performed by Betty Grable and chorus with Charlie Spivak and His Orchestra
- Yankee Doodle Hayride
  - Music by James V. Monaco
  - Lyrics by Mack Gordon
  - Performed by Martha Raye with Charlie Spivak and His Orchestra
  - Danced by the Condos Brothers
- Once Too Often
  - Music by James V. Monaco
  - Lyrics by Mack Gordon
  - Sung by Betty Grable
  - Danced by Betty Grable, Hermes Pan and Angela Blue with Charlie Spivak and His Orchestra
- The Story of the Very Merry Widow
  - Music by James V. Monaco
  - Lyrics by Mack Gordon
  - Performed by Betty Grable with chorus
- The Caisson Song
  - Music by Edmund L. Gruber
  - Played briefly during the opening credits
- Anchors Aweigh
  - Music by Charles A. Zimmerman
  - Played briefly during the opening credits
- The Marine Hymn
  - Music by Jacques Offenbach from Geneviève de Brabant
  - Played briefly during the opening credits
- You'll Never Know
  - Music by Harry Warren
  - Played on the trumpet after the "Yankee Doodle Hayride" number
- The Army Air Corps Song
  - Music by Robert Crawford
  - Played briefly during the opening credits
- Minnie's in the Money
  - Music by Harry Warren
  - Played when the protest proclamation is read to Lorry
- Goin' to the County Fair
  - Music by Harry Warren
  - Played when Eddie Hall stops by Lorry and Kay's table
