= Anna Catharina Zenger =

American publisher (c. 1704–1752)

- Born: Anna Catharina Maul
- Died: 1751 (aged 46–47)
- Occupations: Printer, publisher

Anna Catharina Zenger (c. 1704–1751) was an American publisher and the first woman to publish a newspaper in America.

Her family having fled the Pfalz region of Germany, she was born Anna Catharina Maul around 1704, possibly in England or in the Netherlands. Her family moved through Rotterdam to England and on to New York City in 1710, where she grew up, eventually marrying a member of the same refugee group, John Peter Zenger. The couple married on 11 September 1722 in Manhattan's Dutch Reformed Church.

Her husband had worked for New York printer William Bradford, advancing from an indentured servant, to a journeyman, and eventually becoming Bradford's partner in 1725. After publishing an unremarkable Dutch language book about the reformed church, the partnership dissolved and John established his own printing business. John specialized in Dutch religious and academic texts until, in 1732, he was caught up in a political scandal. That year William Cosby became the colony's new governor, and, in responsive to his perceived capriciousness, an opposition party was formed and Zenger was hired to publish their tracts and pamphlets.

As their conflict with the governor intensified, the opposition founded a newspaper, the New-York Weekly Journal, with John Zenger as the editor, publisher and printer. (In actuality, Zenger was only responsible for printing; the influential lawyer James Alexander was responsible for the paper's tone and content.) In 1734, Cosby retaliated against the paper, ordering four issues to be burned in public, and John Zenger was arrested for seditious libel.

John Zenger, unable to meet bail requirements, ultimately spent more than eight months imprisoned, and during this time Anna Catharina took over his publishing duties. Her level of control over the newspaper during this time is unclear. She is known to have regularly visited her husband in jail and took instructions from him regarding the publication. Author Kent Cooper proposed that, during John's imprisonment, Anna Catharina had editorial control and wrote articles for the paper, but other historians believe that the paper's content was provided by well-educated opposition members. On John's release in 1735, he resumed control of the paper and printing business.

Eleven years later, after her husband's death, Anna Catharina once again took responsibility for running both operations. She continued to publish the paper weekly, including a modest section of advertisements, along with other publications, including an annual almanac, and the printing shop also sold books and stationery.

In 1748 she gave control of the printing business to her stepson, John Zenger, Jr., and moved to a rural area outside of the city where she opened a small bookstore. She died in 1751.

== Media depictions ==
In 1946 Kent Cooper published a "quasi-biographical novel" based on Zenger's life, titled Anna Zenger: Mother of Freedom, portraying Zenger as a "prime mover in America's first successful struggle for a free press." Cooper wrote five songs that were adapted from the book. They were performed on the October 4, 1946, episode of Highways in Melody on NBC radio.

== See also ==
- List of women printers and publishers before 1800
