= Sara Mildred Strauss =

American dancer, educator, choreographer, and writer (1896–1979)

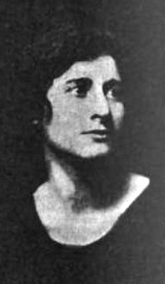
- Sara Mildred Strauss from a 1918 publication.
- Born: September 1, 1896; New York City
- Died: July 7, 1979 (aged 82); Wilmington, North Carolina
- Other names: S. Mildred Strauss, Sara Mildred Strauss Newman (after marriage)
- Occupations: Dancer, choreographer, educator, writer

Sara Mildred Strauss (September 1, 1896 – July 7, 1979) was an American dancer, educator, choreographer, and writer.

== Early life ==
Strauss was born in 1896, in New York City, the daughter of Lehman Strauss and Pauline Cohn Strauss. In 1911, she and her mother, a noted horsewoman, drove a horse-drawn carriage 280 miles, across the state of New York, as a vacation.

== Career ==
=== Dance, choreography, and dance education ===
Strauss established several dance schools, including programs at Carnegie Hall and New York's Ziegfeld Theatre, summer schools in Europe, and a studio in Hollywood. She taught at the American Academy of Dramatic Arts in New York. She was a friend to Russian filmmaker Sergei Eisenstein in New York.

With her company, the Sara Mildred Strauss Dancers, she gave a "novel and experimental" non-musical performance at New York's Guild Theatre in 1928. In 1930, she fought New York's Sunday observance law, which prevented dance performances on Sundays. She argued that her company's performances were not like theatre; "without the aid of music, pantomime, decor, costume or lighting", they were more like displays of visual art. In 1933 she held free public symposia on dance at her studio in Carnegie Hall, with invited speakers and informal themes.

Strauss created and directed choreography for her company, who appeared in Broadway shows, including the Ziegfeld Follies (1934), and Calling All Stars (1934), and in the musical film Sweet Surrender (1935). She also developed "Living Movement Figure Dolls", bendable mannequins for use in store windows and dance instruction.

=== Writing and other activities ===
As a young woman, Strauss wrote The Dance and Life (1916), her treatise on the centrality of dance to physical and mental well-being. "The ground of all human art is bodily motion," she explained. "Into bodily motion enters rhythm, which is the mind of the dance and the skeleton of tone." Here an Inch, There an Inch (1966) was her later book on similar themes. She also gave advice on health, fitness, and posture in newspaper columns.

In the 1920s, Strauss was active in junior auxiliary of the New York section of the National Council of Jewish Women.

== Personal life ==
Sara Mildred Strauss married lawyer Isaac Bear Newman (1901–1981). She moved to Wilmington, North Carolina, late in life, and died there in 1979, aged 82 years. Her papers are in the Jerome Robbins Dance Collection at the New York Public Library. There is another collection of her papers at the William Madison Randall Library, University of North Carolina at Wilmington.
