= Libbie Block =

American novelist

Libbie Block (July 10, 1910 – March 30, 1972) was an American writer.

== Biography ==
Libbie Block was born on July 10, 1910, in Denver, Colorado. She was the daughter of Russian immigrants, David and Mildred Block.

She wrote over 250 short stories and novels. In 1944, her short story Imagine Us! was made into the film Pin Up Girl, starring Betty Grable, while her novel Wild Calendar was made into the film Caught, in 1949.

In 1959, a compilation of Block's short stories was published under the title No Man Tells Everything. She is also known for writing Bedeviled (1947), The Hills of Beverly (1957), and This Town Needs a Doctor (1971).

She was married to Pat Duggan, and together, they had three children. She died on March 30, 1972, in Denver.
