= The Growing Paynes =

- Created by: Pat Fay
- Starring: John Harvey (1948-1949); Judith Parrish (1948-1949); Edward Holmes (1949); Elaine Stritch (1949)
- Country of origin: United States
- No. of seasons: 1

Production
- Running time: 30 minutes

Original release
- Network: DuMont
- Release: October 20, 1948 – August 3, 1949

The Growing Paynes is an American sitcom that aired on the DuMont Television Network.

== Broadcast history ==
The series aired on DuMont on Wednesdays at 8:30 pm ET for one season, 1948 to 1949. The series stars John Harvey, Judith Parrish, David Anderson, Ann Sullivan, Lester Lonergan, Jr., and Warren Parker.

One of the first sitcoms to air in the United States, the 30-minute series was broadcast live. Advertisements for the show's sponsor, Wanamaker's Department Store, were worked into the early stories. Harvey and Parrish, who were husband and wife in real life, left the show in 1949 and were replaced by Edward Holmes and Elaine Stritch as Mr. and Mrs. Payne. This series marked Stritch's television debut.

== Synopsis ==
The setting is the Payne family's apartment. Comedic situations deal with the trials of an insurance salesman, George Payne (played by Harvey), his screwball wife, Laraine Payne (played by Parrish), and their young son, John Payne (played by Anderson). Often it is their maid, Birdie (played by Sullivan), who saves the day.

== Episode status ==
One episode of The Growing Paynes is at the UCLA Film and Television Archive and four episodes are at the Paley Center for Media.

== Cast ==
- John Harvey as George Payne (1948-1949)
- Judith Parrish as Laraine Payne (1948-1949)
- David Anderson as John Payne
- Ann Sullivan as Birdie
- Lester Lonergan, Jr.
- Warren Parker

== Replacement cast ==
- Edward Holmes as George Payne (1949)
- Elaine Stritch as Laraine Payne (1949)

== See also ==
- List of programs broadcast by the DuMont Television Network
- List of surviving DuMont Television Network broadcasts
- 1948-49 United States network television schedule
- Mary Kay and Johnny (The first sitcom to air in the United States)

== Bibliography ==
- David Weinstein, The Forgotten Network: DuMont and the Birth of American Television (Philadelphia: Temple University Press, 2004) ISBN 1-59213-245-6
- Alex McNeil, Total Television, Fourth edition (New York: Penguin Books, 1980) ISBN 0-14-024916-8
- Tim Brooks and Earle Marsh, The Complete Directory to Prime Time Network and Cable TV Shows 1946–Present, Ninth edition (New York: Ballantine Books, 2007) ISBN 978-0-345-49773-4
