= Gloria Nord =

- Gloria Nord shown on program cover for the 1948 Skating Vanities

Background information
- Born: Gloria Nordskog; August 2, 1922
- Died: December 30, 2009 (aged 87)
- Years active: 1940–61

Gloria Nord (born Gloria Nordskog; August 2, 1922 – December 30, 2009) was an American roller skater, ice skater and pin-up girl who became known as "Sonja Henie on wheels," and "the Sonja Henie of the roller rinks." Nord was reportedly "adored by millions in the 1940s and 1950s for her balletic finesse and theatrical flamboyance."

== Biography ==
Nord grew up in Santa Monica and Hollywood, California. Nord was the youngest of five children of Andrae Nordskog, a noted concert singer. Nord studied dance and, at age 15, she was an established child entertainer. She attended Miss Long's Professional School, a school for stage kids in Hollywood.

Nord's aspiration to become a Broadway singer, dancer and actress changed when motion picture theater owner, Sid Grauman, opened the Hollywood Roller Bowl. Within three weeks' after the bowl opened, Nord was giving exhibitions in roller skating. By age 18, the 5 foot, 2 inch (157 cm), 115 pound (52 kg) Nord was discovered by Edward W. Smith—Publisher and Editor of Skating Review Magazine—and was touring the United States and appearing in roller-skating movies. In 1942, boxing promoter Harold Steinman saw Nord perform and borrowed $10,000 to create the "Skating Vanities," a touring show featuring Nord and 100 other roller skaters. Nord was the leading performer in the "Skating Vanities" from 1942 through the early 1950s. The "Skating Vanities" starring Nord attracted more than a million people during its first two tours of 20 cities. In 1943, syndicated sports writer Harry Grayson described the impact Nord had on the sport:

This little lady means much to the nation's 15,000,000 roller-skaters. There are 4000 arena roller rinks in the country to less than 200 ice rinks, 20 roller-skaters for every ice-skater. Once the sport of roughnecks, roller-skating has been taken up by the best people of all ages.

In 1944, Nord appeared in a roller-skating scene with Betty Grable in the motion picture, "Pin Up Girl." Nord herself became a popular pin-up girl with American soldiers during World War II. The 1945 show program for "Skating Vanities" included the following from a profile on Nord:

Lovely Gloria Nord, 21-year-old ballerina of 'Skating Vanities,' has a double claim to fame. Not only is she acknowledged as the outstanding dance-skater in America, but she is also one of the country's most beautiful girls. Her face and figure have adorned such national publications as The Saturday Evening Post, Look, Pic, the New York Sunday News, and others. She has won acclaim for her solo skating in the aptly titled movie, "Pin-Up Girl." And her photographs have been requested by American servicemen all over the world.

In the 1950s, Nord turned to ice skating and was featured in productions at Wembley Arena in London. In 1953, Nord gave a command performance before Queen Elizabeth II. Nord toured Europe and Australia with her skating reviews and continue performing until the early 1960s. Nord lived in Mission Viejo, California in her later years. She died in Mission Viejo in December 2009 at age 87.
