= Kent Cooper =

American reporter (1880–1965)

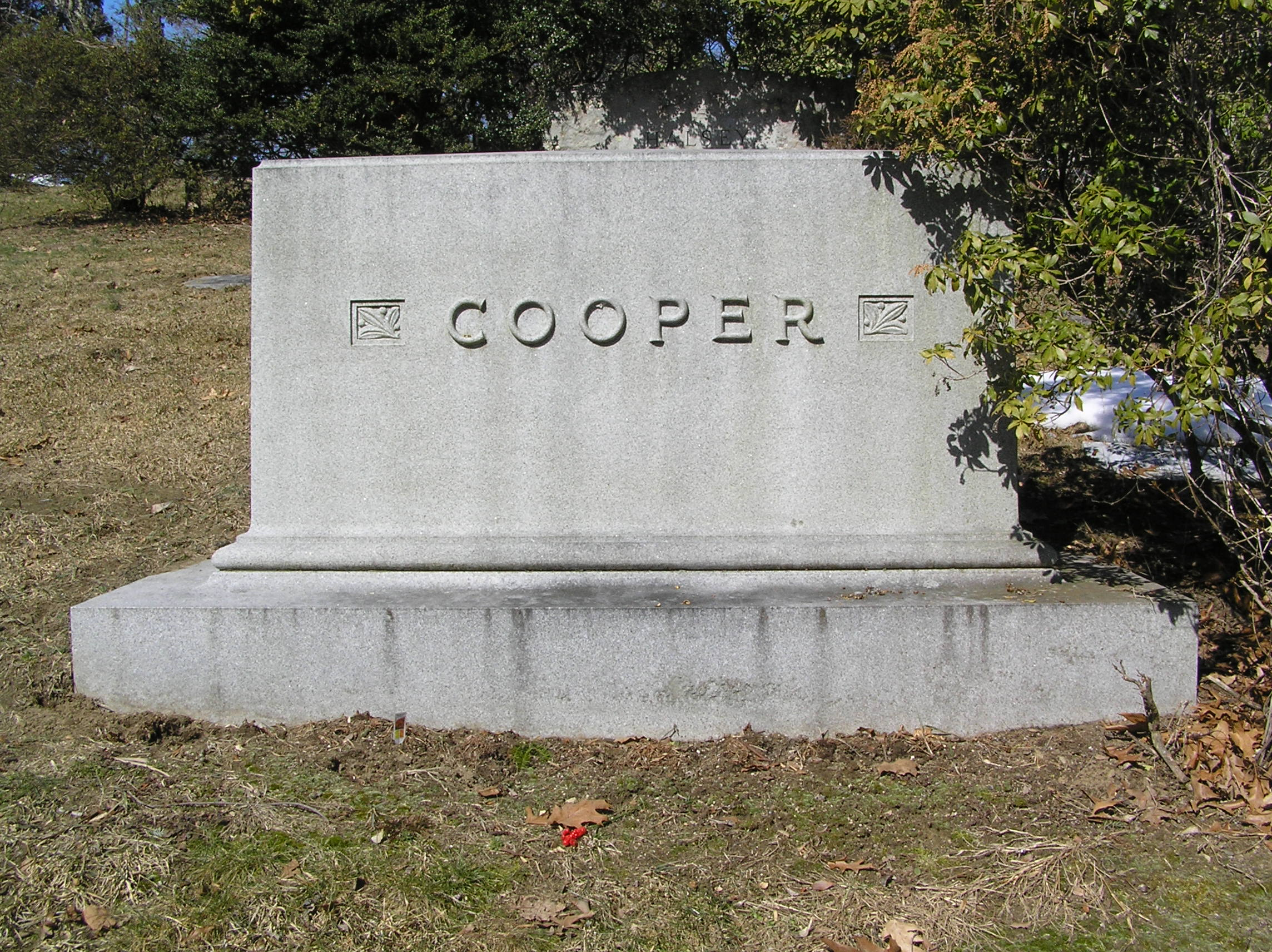
- Kent Cooper's headstone
- Born: March 22, 1880; Columbus, Indiana, US
- Died: January 31, 1965 (aged 84); West Palm Beach, Florida, US
- Occupation: Served with Associated Press (AP) for 41 years
- Known for: Past Executive Director of the AP

Kent Cooper (March 22, 1880 – January 31, 1965) served with the Associated Press (AP) for 41 years, last as executive director.

== Background ==
Kent Cooper was born on March 22, 1880, in Columbus, Indiana; his father was Democratic U.S. Congressman George W. Cooper.

== Career ==
His father's early death led Cooper to turn his after-school job as reporter for a local newspaper into a full-time job. He became a reporter for the Indianapolis Press newspaper. He joined the Scripps-McRae Press Association (later United Press), established his own news agency, and then returned to Scripps-McRae in a buy-out.

In 1910, Melville Stone, editor of the Associated Press, hired him as traveling inspector. In 1912, he was promoted to chief of traffic. In 1920, he was promoted to assistant general manager. In 1925, he became general manager.

In the late 1920s, Cooper hired AP's first class of women reporters, including Marguerite Young, who later, as Washington bureau chief for the Daily Worker, would introduce Soviet spy Hede Massing to American diplomat Noel Field.

Innovations introduced under his stewardship include use of the first high-speed telegraph printing machines, use of teletype (instead of Morse Code), and introduction of a photograph wire service (by 1935, known as World Wide Photos). By 1929, he had also opened bureaus in London, Paris, and Berlin.

During his 41 years with AP, Cooper's positions included general manager (1925–1943) and finally executive director.

== Personal and death ==
In 1920, Cooper married Marian Rothwell; they divorced in 1940.

On January 31, 1965, he died in West Palm Beach, Florida. He is buried in Sleepy Hollow Cemetery, Sleepy Hollow, New York.

== Legacy ==
Cooper Glacier in Antarctica is named for him.

== Awards ==
Cooper received honorary degrees from:

- Indiana University in 1941
- Northwestern University in 1947
- New York University in 1948

== Works ==
Cooper coined the term "the right to know" with publication of his book The Right to Know (1956).

Books:

- Barriers Down (1942)
- Anna Zenger, Mother of Freedom (1946)
- The Minnesota Strip (1949)
- The Right to Know (1956)
- Kent Cooper and the Associated Press: An Autobiography (New York: Random House, 1958)

Articles:

- "The Future of the AP" (December 1943)

== See also ==
- United Press
- Associated Press
- Marguerite Young
