= Four Jills in a Jeep =

1944 film by William A. Seiter

- Directed by: William A. Seiter
- Screenplay by: Robert Ellis; Helen Logan; Snag Werris
- Story by: Froma Sand; Fred Niblo Jr.
- Produced by: Irving Starr
- Starring: Kay Francis; Carole Landis; Martha Raye; Mitzi Mayfair
- Cinematography: J. Peverell Marley
- Edited by: Ray Curtiss
- Music by: Score: Hugo Friedhofer; Arthur Lange; Cyril J. Mockridge; Songs: Jimmy McHugh (music); Harold Adamson (lyrics)
- Production company: Twentieth Century Fox
- Distributed by: Twentieth Century Fox
- Release date: March 17, 1944
- Running time: 89 minutes
- Country: United States
- Language: English

Four Jills in a Jeep is a 1944 American comedy-drama musical film directed by William A. Seiter and starring Kay Francis, Carole Landis, Martha Raye, and Mitzi Mayfair as themselves, reenacting their USO tour of Europe and North Africa during World War II.

== Plot ==
Tired of doing morale-boosting radio shows from the safety of an American studio, the title quartet are shipped overseas as a USO tour - Raye and Landis and Mayfair as performers and Francis as tour co-ordinator. They are accompanied by Eddie, their jeep driver and luggage toter.

The theme is that romance can be interrupted by war at any given time - Landis falls for officer Ted Warren and Mitzi meets Lt. Dick Ryan, an old flame whose dance team broke up under bad circumstances.

Never dreaming it could actually happen, Raye jokes that they would be happy to entertain on the front lines. They get orders to sail to North Africa just before the married Landis and Harvey plan a one-night honeymoon.

Arriving in North Africa, the quartet finds they have to travel by camel. There they discover the biggest need is not for entertainers, but for nurses. The quartet pitch in to give whatever help and comfort they can, winning the respect of the head nurse. Then, even though they are bone-tired, they put on one final show for the soldiers.

== Cast ==
- Kay Francis as herself
- Carole Landis as herself
- Martha Raye as herself
- Mitzi Mayfair as herself
- Jimmy Dorsey and His Orchestra as Themselves
- John Harvey as Ted Warren
- Phil Silvers as Eddie
- Dick Haymes as Lt. Dick Ryan
- Alice Faye as herself
- Betty Grable as herself
- Carmen Miranda as herself
- George Jessel as himself

== Production ==
The working titles of the film were Command Performance and Camp Show.

The film is based on the actual experiences of Kay Francis, Carole Landis, Martha Raye and Mitzi Mayfair, members of the Feminine Theatrical Task Force who left the United States on October 16, 1942, and performed several shows per day for American and British troops in England, Ireland and North Africa. They also presented a command performance for the queen of the United Kingdom.

After leaving England, the women spent three weeks in North Africa, the first USO tour of that area. Francis and Mayfair then returned to the United States. Landis returned to England to join her husband. As depicted in the film, Landis met U.S. Army Air Forces pilot Capt. Thomas C. Wallace in England in November 1942 and married him on January 5, 1943. The couple divorced in July 1945. Raye continued touring, and her association with the USO endured through the American wars in Korea and Vietnam.

Landis and Edwin Seaver wrote a book about her travels while the film was in preproduction. Although Landis's material was not used in the screenplay, the studio permitted her to share the title her book with that of the film for the publicity value. Her book was published in 1944, first as a serial in The Saturday Evening Post. While the film is based on the experiences of all four women, only Mayfair and Francis contributed directly to the screenplay.

Islin Auster was originally scheduled to produce the film. An August 1943 news account noted that Jack Oakie had been cast for the comedy lead role and that Cornel Wilde was being considered for "the juvenile spot."

Studio head Darryl F. Zanuck asked director William A. Seiter to limit Raye's often loud and frenetic screen presence. She was scheduled to sing her own composition "Jeep, Jeep, Listen to the Soldiers Sing," but the song does not appear in the film.

The film marked the screen debut of singer Dick Haymes. It was Francis's first film appearance since the 1942 Universal production Between Us Girls. Mayfair had not appeared in a feature film since the 1930 musical Paramount on Parade, and Four Jills in a Jeep was her last screen appearance. Dance director Don Loper was borrowed from MGM for the production.

Landis, Raye and Mayfair also planned to appear in a short film recreating their act to be shown to troops.

== Reception ==
In a contemporary review for The New York Times, critic Bosley Crowther wrote: "It gives the painful impression of having been tossed together in a couple of hours. All that happens, really, is a lot of dizzying about the dames and some singing and dancing by them in an undistinguished style."

== See also ==
- List of American films of 1944
