= Calling All Stars (1934 musical) =

1934 musical revue

Calling All Stars is a 1934 musical revue with music by Harry Akst, lyrics by Lew Brown, and orchestrations by Hans Spialek and Conrad Salinger. Featuring separate segments of sketch comedy rather than a unified plot, the dialogue of the musical was written by Lew Brown, A. Dorian Otvos, Alan Baxter, Home Fickett, William K. Wells and H.I. Philips. Al Goodman served as the original production's music director which was produced and directed by Lew Brown. Sara Mildred Strauss and Maurice L. Kussel choreographed the show, Nat Karson designed the sets, Billi Livingston designed the costumes, and Abe Feder designed the lighting.

The musical premiered at the Boston Opera House on November 23, 1934 for tryout performances before moving to Broadway. The production opened on Broadway at the Hollywood Theatre on December 13, 1934 with a cast led by Lou Holtz, Phil Baker, Mitzi Mayfair, Everett Marshall, Sara Mildred Strauss, Patricia Bowman, Judy Canova, Peggy Taylor, Martha Raye, Jack Whiting, Estelle Jayne, Harry McNaughton., and Ella Logan in her American debut. The production closed after 36 performances on January 12, 1935.
