= Mitzi Mayfair =

American actress

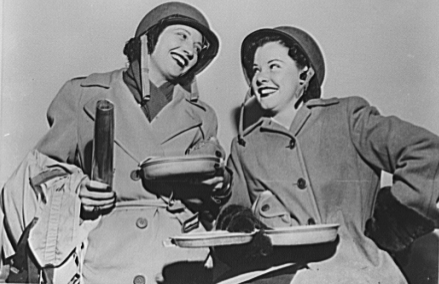
- Mayfair (right) and Kay Francis on a USO tour in April 1943, photographed by Ann Rosener
- Born: Juanita Emylyn Pique; June 6, 1914; Fulton, Kentucky, U.S.
- Died: May 30, 1976 (aged 61); Tucson, Arizona, U.S.
- Occupations: Actress, dancer

Mitzi Mayfair (born Juanita Emylyn Pique; June 6, 1914 – May 30, 1976) was an American dancer and stage and film actress.

== Life and career ==
Born in Fulton, Kentucky, she grew up in St. Louis, Missouri. In 1936, she told a Harvard Crimson interviewer, "I guess I'm just a natural dancer". She recalled performing professionally albeit underage at age 11 in a "Kids Act". She was seen and hired by vaudevillian Gus Edwards and taken on tour; at one stop, "child labor authorities hauled her ... off the stage".

She continued to work in vaudeville and on stage. Mayfair was in at least four Broadway productions in the 1930s, including Flo Ziegfeld's Follies in 1931 and Harry Akst's Calling All Stars in 1934. She joined the cast of At Home Abroad when star Eleanor Powell, also discovered by Gus Edwards, had to leave the show.

According to the Pittsburgh Post-Gazette, "the manager of the Main Street Theater in Kansas City" did not like her name, and changed it to Mitzi Mayfair without her knowledge; when she first saw the name on the marquee, she thought she had been replaced. However, the Brooklyn Daily Eagle had a different story, stating that Gus Edwards forgot her name and made one up.

Like many performers of the New York stage, Mitzi Mayfair found occasional work in short-subject films produced in New York. In 1931 she was hired as Ziegfeld Follies star Hal Le Roy's dancing partner in three musical shorts for Vitaphone, and she starred without Le Roy in a fourth.

The celebrated dancer Irene Castle considered having Mayfair—among others—play her in the film The Story of Vernon and Irene Castle, but decided she was not a big enough star. As Fred Astaire had already been cast as Vernon, the part went to Ginger Rogers.

During World War II, Mayfair embarked on a USO tour of Europe and North Africa with Kay Francis, Carole Landis, Martha Raye and others. All four performers played themselves in the film re-creation of the tour, Four Jills in a Jeep (1944). This film, as well as Paramount on Parade (1930) and a brief cameo in Stage Door Canteen (1943), were Mitzi Mayfair's only feature-film credits.

== Personal life ==
Her first husband was Albert F. Hoffman, heir to a fortune from beverage-making. They married on March 12, 1938, at Hoffman's brother's home in South Orange, New Jersey. They were divorced in 1943. On April 7, 1944, she married Charles Henderson, "associate boss of the music department of the 20th Century-Fox Studio". It is unclear when this marriage ended. On June 28, 1963, Mayfair married Fred S. Cook of Kitsap County, Washington.

She died in Pima, Arizona in May 1976 at age 61.
