= Edwin Seaver =

American publisher & writer (1900–1987)

Edwin Seaver (1900–1987) was a 20th-century American publisher, writer, editor, and critic, best known for his work with left-wing magazines (including the Call, Leader, New Masses) and newspapers (Daily Worker), as well as book publishing houses including Book-of-the-Month Club, Little, Brown and Company, and George Braziller, .

== Background ==
Edwin Seaver was born in 1900 in Washington, DC, to a Jewish family and raised in Philadelphia. He attended a New England prep school and then Harvard College.

== Career ==
Inclined to Communism, he worked for publications including the Menorah Journal, the New Masses, and Partisan Review.

He also co-wrote a book with actress Carole Landis called Four Jills in a Jeep (1944), made to accompany movie of the same name that year.

In 1948, Max Lerner reviewed in Fortune (magazine), "The Businessman in Fiction," by John Chamberlain, whom he criticized for lumping left-leaning writers together as "heretics": Sinclair Lewis, Frederic Wakeman, John P. Marquand, Samuel Hopkins Adams, Lester Cohen, Norman Mailer, Christina Stead, Hiram Haydn, Robert Penn Warren, Charles Yale Harrison, Hugh MacLennan, Herman Wouk, Robert Rylee, Taylor Caldwell, Upton Sinclair, John Steinbeck, MacKinlay Kantor, Robert Wilder, Thomas Duncan, Merle Miller, Robert van Gelder, Mary McCarthy, Arthur Miller, Theodore Dreiser, John Dos Passos, Edwin Seaver, Mary Heaton Vorse, Grace Lumpkin, William Rollins, Robert Cantwell, Jack Conroy, Jack London, Robert Herrick, Frank Norris, William Dean Howells, Edith Wharton, Henry Adams, and Henry James.

He was a sponsor of the Scientific and Cultural Conference for World Peace, held in New York City, March 25–27, 1949, arranged by the National Council of the Arts, Sciences, and Professions as follow-up to an earlier gathering, the World Congress of Intellectuals in Defense of Peace, held in Poland, August 25–28, 1948.

Seaver was interviewed during the McCarthy hearings but never confirmed as a Communist.

== Works ==
Seaver wrote the novels The Company (Macmillan, 1930) and Between the Hammer and the Anvil (Julian Messner, 1937).

- The Company (1930)
- All in the racket, with William E. Weeks, introduced by Arthur Garfield Hays (1930)
- Between the hammer and the anvil (1937)
- World's great love novels (1944)
- Cross section: a collection of new American writing (1944–1948)
- Pageant of American humor (1948)
- "Only an Editor", New York Review of Books (August 24, 1967)
- So far, so good: recollections of a life in publishing (preface by Angus Cameron) (1986)
