= Martha Raye =

American comic actress and singer (1916–1994)

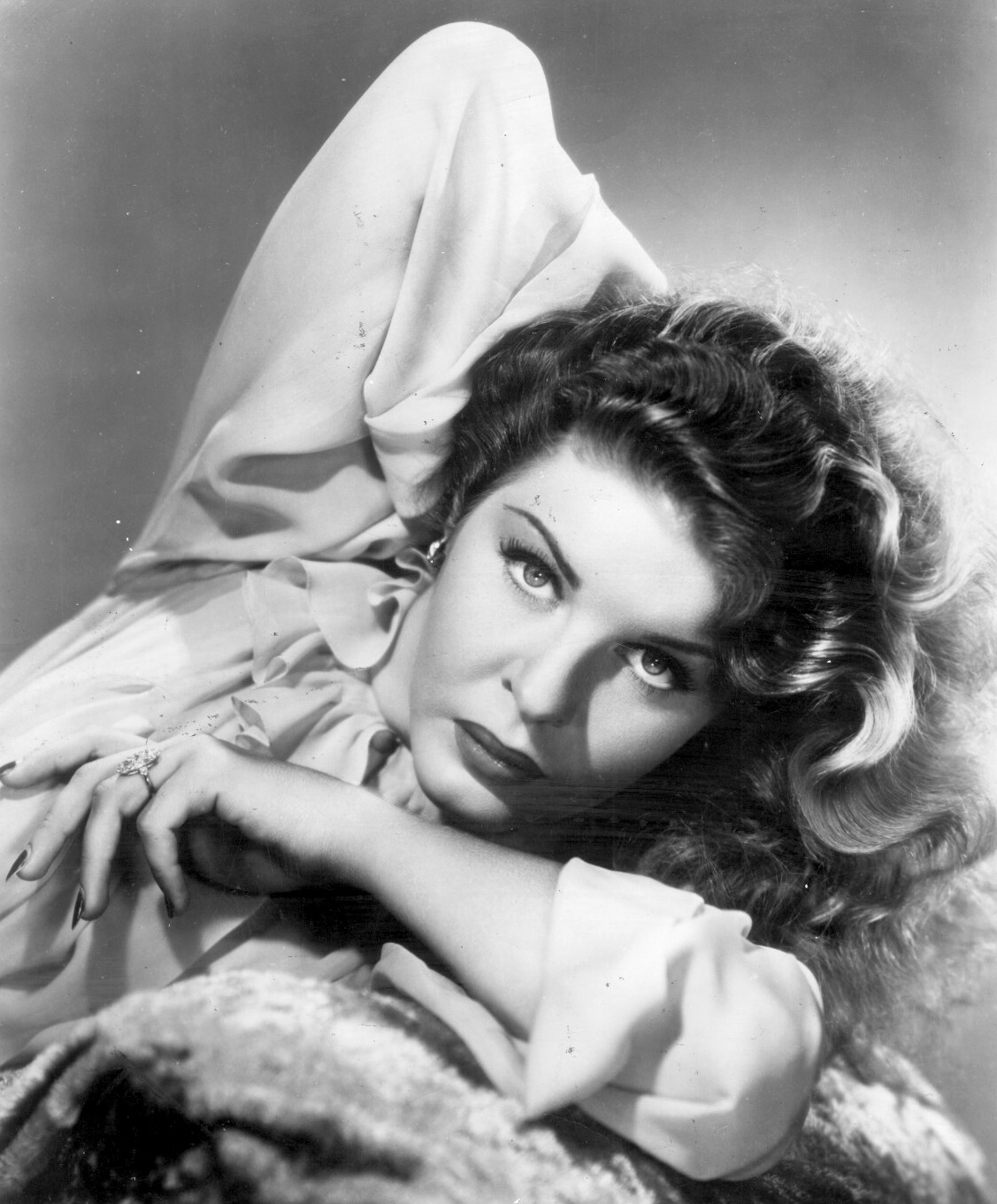
- Raye in a 1951 press photo
- Born: Margy Reed; August 27, 1916; Butte, Montana, U.S.
- Died: October 19, 1994 (aged 78); Los Angeles, California, U.S.
- Resting place: Main Post Cemetery, Fort Bragg, North Carolina, U.S.
- Other name: The Big Mouth
- Occupations: Actress; singer; comedian
- Years active: 1934–1989
- Spouses: Bud Westmore (m. 1937; div. 1937) David Rose (m. 1938; div. 1941) Neal Lang (m. 1941; div. 1944) Nick Condos (m. 1944; div. 1953) Edward T. Begley (m. 1954; div. 1956) Robert O'Shea (m. 1956; div. 1960) Mark Harris (m. 1991)
- Children: 1

Martha Raye (born Margy Reed; August 27, 1916 – October 19, 1994) was an American comic actress and singer whose career spanned six decades across film, theater, and television. Her wide smile and energetic comedic style earned her the nickname "The Big Mouth."

Born to vaudevillian parents in Butte, Montana, Raye began performing in her family's stage act at age three. She began performing on Broadway at age eighteen, before making her feature film debut in Rhythm on the Range (1936). As a contract player for Paramount Pictures, she starred in numerous films for the studio over the following decade, including Waikiki Wedding, Mountain Music, Double or Nothing (all 1937), Never Say Die (1939), and The Farmer's Daughter (1940).

In 1942, she joined the United Service Organizations during World War II and became a frequent performer for U.S. troops. Raye returned to acting with performances in films such as Pin Up Girl (1944) and Charlie Chaplin's Monsieur Verdoux (1947). In the 1950s, Raye continued to occasionally perform in stage productions, as well as hosting her own television show, The Martha Raye Show. Raye also had a recurring guest role on the sitcom Alice (1979–1984), playing Carrie Sharples. She made her final feature film appearance in The Concorde... Airport '79 (1979).

She was honored in 1969 at the Academy Awards as the Jean Hersholt Humanitarian Award recipient for her volunteer efforts and services to the troops.

== Early life ==
Raye was born Margy Reed on August 27, 1916 at St. James Hospital in Butte, Montana, the eldest of three children born to vaudeville performers Maybelle Hazel (née Hooper) and Peter F. Reed Jr.. Her father was an Irish immigrant, while her mother, a native of Great Falls, Montana, was of English heritage. At the time of her birth, Raye's parents were performing in local vaudeville theatre, billed as "Reed and Hooper."

Raye had a peripatetic childhood, and began performing at age three as part of her parents' touring stage act. Her younger brother, Douglas "Buddy" Reed, was born shortly before her second birthday, while the family was performing in Grand Rapids, Michigan. The siblings eventually became a regular part of their family's stage act. While the family was living in Chicago, Raye's parents welcomed a third child, daughter Melodye.

Raye's parents had a tumultuous relationship, as her father struggled with alcoholism. Due to the family's frequent relocations, she received little formal education, though she did attend the Professional Children's School in New York City for a period.

== Career ==
=== Early stage and film roles ===
As a teenager in the early 1930s, Raye began her career as a vocalist with the Paul Ash and Boris Morros orchestras. She made her first film appearance in a band short titled A Nite in the Nite Club (1934). In 1936, she was signed for comic roles by Paramount Pictures; her first feature film was Rhythm on the Range with Bing Crosby and Frances Farmer. She made her Broadway debut in the Harry Akst musical Calling All Stars in 1934.

From 1936 to 1939, she was a featured cast member in 39 episodes of Al Jolson's weekly CBS radio show, The Lifebuoy Program, also called Cafe Trocadero. In addition to comedy, Raye sang both solos and duets with Jolson.

Raye starred in an ensemble cast alongside Bob Burns in The Big Broadcast of 1937 (1936). This was followed by a lead role opposite Burns and Bing Crosby in the musical comedy film Waikiki Wedding (1937). Raye was paired again with Burns the same year in Mountain Music, and with Crosby in Double or Nothing. The following year, she starred in the musical comedy Give Me a Sailor opposite Bob Hope and Betty Grable. Raye next appeared opposite Hope in the romantic comedy Never Say Die (1939), directed by Elliott Nugent.

She returned to Broadway in a starring role in Yip Harburg's Hold On to Your Hats (1940), and starred in the comedy film The Farmer's Daughter the same year. In 1941, she starred opposite comedy duo Abbott and Costello in the Arthur Lubin-directed comedy Keep 'Em Flying, and opposite Ann Sheridan and Jack Oakie in Navy Blues.

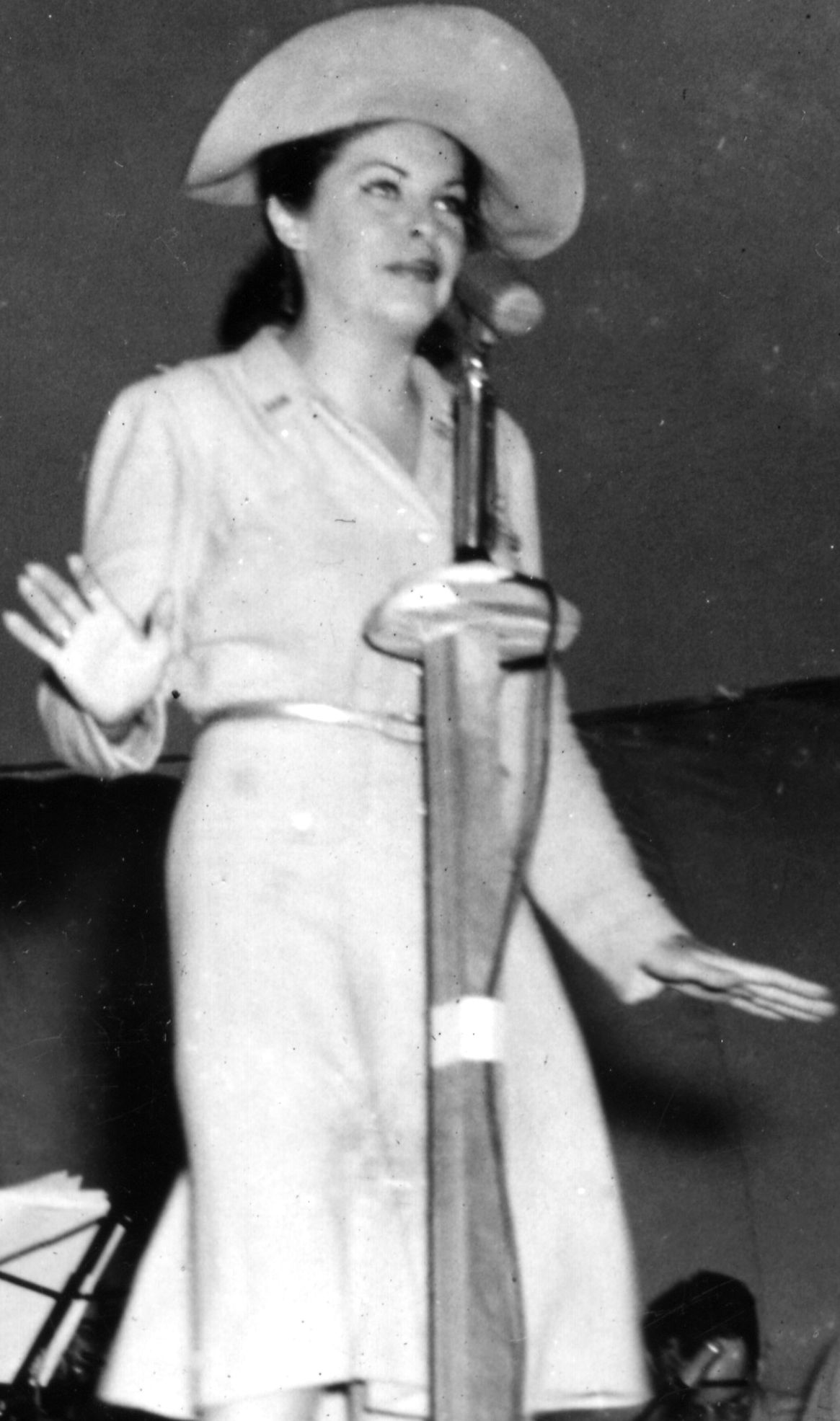
Raye performing for troops in Africa, 1943

In 1942, Raye joined the United Service Organizations (USO), soon after the US entered World War II, and became a regular international performer for American troops over the following two years.

In 1944, Raye appeared in supporting roles in two films for 20th Century Fox: Four Jills in a Jeep and Pin Up Girl. In 1947, she was cast in a supporting role in Monsieur Verdoux, a dark comedy directed by and co-starring Charlie Chaplin.

=== Television and theater ===
Raye was a television star very early in its history. She starred in The Martha Raye Show (1954–1956), opposite retired middleweight boxer Rocky Graziano, who played her boyfriend. The writer and producer was future The Phil Silvers Show creator Nat Hiken. The series ran for three seasons. Some of the guest stars on the series included Zsa Zsa Gabor, Cesar Romero, and Broadway dancer Wayne Lamb. She also appeared on other TV shows in the 1950s, such as What's My Line?

She had a lead role in the Metro-Goldwyn-Mayer musical Billy Rose's Jumbo (1962), co-starring with Doris Day, Stephen Boyd, and Jimmy Durante. Raye returned to theater with lead role on Broadway in Jerry Herman's Hello, Dolly! (1967), and later in Vincent Youmans's No, No, Nanette (1972).

=== Later career ===
In 1970, she portrayed Boss Witch, the "Queen of all Witchdom", in the feature film Pufnstuf for Sid and Marty Krofft. This role led to her being cast as villainess Benita Bizarre in the series The Bugaloos (1970), which the Kroffts produced the same year.

She often appeared as a guest on other programs, particularly those which often featured older performers as guest stars, such as The Love Boat, and on variety programs, including the short-lived The Roy Rogers and Dale Evans Show. She appeared from the third to the ninth seasons as Carrie Sharples, Mel's mother on Alice, making two or three appearances per season. She made guest appearances or did cameos in series such as Murder, She Wrote, The Andy Williams Show, and McMillan & Wife. She appeared again as Agatha for the six-episode run of the retooled McMillan, taking over for Nancy Walker, who had left the series. Her last film appearance was as an airline passenger in the disaster film The Concorde... Airport '79 (1979).

== Personal life ==
Raye's personal life was complex and emotionally tumultuous, marked by alcoholism as well as a cocaine addiction. Following the demise of her TV variety show, the breakup of her fifth marriage, and a series of other personal and health problems, Raye attempted suicide by overdosing on sleeping pills on August 14, 1956.

Following her suicide attempt, well-wishers and fans gifted her a St. Christopher's medal, a St. Genesius medal, and a Star of David. After her recovery, she wore these amulets faithfully, though she was neither Catholic nor Jewish. At the conclusion of each episode of her TV show, she would thank the nuns at the Sisters of St. Francis Hospital in Miami, Florida, where she had recovered. She always said "Goodnight, Sisters" as a sign of appreciation and gratitude. Raye was a devout Methodist who regularly attended church, read the Bible daily, and also taught Sunday school.

Politically, Raye was Republican, commenting: "I believe in the constitution, strength in national defense, limited government, individual freedom, and personal responsibility. [Republicans] reinforce the resolve that the United States is the greatest country in the world, and we can all be eternally grateful to our founding fathers for the beautiful legacy they left us."

=== Relationships ===
Raye was married seven times. Her engagement to orchestra leader Johnny Torrence was announced in June 1936. Less than two months later she commented, "They tell me I've gone Hollywood already because I got engaged to Johnny Torrence one day and broke it off the next."

She was married to make-up artist Hamilton "Buddy" Westmore from May 30, 1937, until September 1937, filing for divorce on the basis of extreme cruelty; to composer-conductor David Rose from October 8, 1938, to May 19, 1941; and to Neal Lang from May 25, 1941, to February 3, 1944.

Raye was married to Nick Condos from February 22, 1944, to June 17, 1953. She had one child—a daughter, Melodye, born in July 1944—with Condos. Melodye was named after Raye's recently-deceased younger sister.

She was later married to Edward T. Begley from April 21, 1954, to October 6, 1956; and to Robert O'Shea from November 7, 1956, to December 1, 1960.

Raye married her seventh and final husband, Mark Harris, on September 25, 1991, three weeks after they first met. He was 30 years younger than her. Though Raye was a Methodist, the couple were married by a rabbi, as Harris was Jewish. Harris, who was openly bisexual, later claimed after her death that Raye herself was also bisexual.

== Death ==
Raye suffered ill health in her final years, living with Alzheimer's disease and cardiovascular disease, the latter of which resulted in a major stroke in 1990. Complications from the stroke eventually resulted in her having her left leg amputated in October 1993, followed by her right leg in February 1994. Raye also suffered from liver disease stemming from decades of alcohol abuse.

She died of pneumonia at Cedars-Sinai Medical Center in Los Angeles on October 19, 1994, aged 78.

In the period leading up to Raye's death, her estranged daughter, Melodye, sued her for conservatorship over her estate, claiming Raye was unable to manage her financial affairs or resist "fraud and undue influence." Prior to her death, Raye revised her will, leaving her husband Harris their home, and the remainder of her $2 million estate. In a final gesture, Raye had bequeathed $50,000 to her daughter in exchange for dropping any contest to the will.

== Honors ==
In 1969, she was awarded the Jean Hersholt Humanitarian Award in the form of an Oscar at the 41st Academy Awards. She was the first woman to receive this award. After her death, the statuette was displayed for many years in a specially constructed lighted niche at the Friars Club in Beverly Hills.

On November 2, 1993, she was awarded the Presidential Medal of Freedom by President Bill Clinton for her service to her country. The citation reads:

A talented performer whose career spans the better part of a century, Martha Raye has delighted audiences and uplifted spirits around the globe. She brought her tremendous comedic and musical skills to her work in film, stage, and television, helping to shape American entertainment. The great courage, kindness, and patriotism she showed in her many tours during World War II, the Korean War, and the Vietnam War earned her the nickname Colonel Maggie. The American people honor Martha Raye, a woman who has tirelessly used her gifts to benefit the lives of her fellow Americans.

== Legacy ==
Raye was known for the size of her mouth, which was large in proportion to her face, earning her the nickname "The Big Mouth". She referred to this in a series of television commercials for Polident denture cleaner in the 1980s: "So take it from The Big Mouth: new Polident Green gets tough stains clean!" Her large mouth would relegate her motion picture work to supporting comic parts, and was often made up so it appeared even larger. In the Disney cartoon Mother Goose Goes Hollywood, she is caricatured while dancing with Joe E. Brown, another actor known for a big mouth. In the Warner Bros. cartoon The Woods Are Full of Cuckoos (1937), she was caricatured as a jazzy scat-singing donkey named 'Moutha Bray'.

"In late October 1942, Raye partnered with fellow entertainers Kay Francis, Carole Landis, and Mitzi Mayfair for an overseas tour, which took them to England and North Africa. In between shows, Raye, having trained as a nurse's aide in Los Angeles, helped military medical personnel in field hospitals. After her colleagues returned home, Raye carried on by herself until yellow fever and anemia forced her return to the states in March 1943."

Appreciation of her work with the USO during World War II and subsequent wars led to her being named both an honorary colonel in the U.S. Marines and an honorary lieutenant colonel in the U.S. Army, and earned special consideration to be buried in Arlington National Cemetery. Upon her death it was instead requested that she be buried with full military honors in the Fort Bragg Main Post cemetery at Spring Lake, North Carolina, home of her loving and beloved United States Army Special Forces; the Fifth Special Forces Group (Airborne) made her an honorary Green Beret for her USO work in Vietnam, including an unauthorized visit to the Leghorn, a top secret SOG listening post on a spire in Laos.

Raye has two stars on the Hollywood Walk of Fame—one for motion pictures at 6251 Hollywood Boulevard and the other for television at 6547 Hollywood Blvd.

The moving image collection of Martha Raye is held at the Academy Film Archive. The collection consists of an audio tape and home movies.

== Filmography ==
=== Film ===
Year	Title	Role(s)	Notes	Ref.
1934	A Nite in a Nite Club	Herself	Short film	
1936	Rhythm on the Range	Emma Mazda		
1936	The Big Broadcast of 1937	Patsy		
1936	Hideaway Girl	Helen Flint		
1936	College Holiday	Daisy Schloggenheimer		
1937	Waikiki Wedding	Myrtle Finch		
1937	Mountain Music	Mary Beamish		
1937	Artists and Models	Speciality		
1937	Double or Nothing	Liza Lou Lane		
1937	Cinema Circus	Herself	Archive footage	
1938	The Big Broadcast of 1938	Martha Bellows		
1938	College Swing	Mabel Grady		
1938	Tropic Holiday	Midge Miller		
1938	Give Me a Sailor	Letty Larkin		
1939	Never Say Die	Mickey Hawkins		
1939	$1,000 a Touchdown	Martha Madison		
1940	The Farmer's Daughter	Patience Bingham		
1940	The Boys from Syracuse	Luce		
1941	Navy Blues	Lilibelle Bolton		
1941	Keep 'Em Flying	Gloria Phelps / Barbara Phelps		
1941	Hellzapoppin'	Betty Johnson		
1944	Four Jills in a Jeep	Herself		
1944	Pin Up Girl	Molly McKay		
1947	Monsieur Verdoux	Annabella Bonheur		
1962	Billy Rose's Jumbo	Lulu		
1970	No Substitute for Victory	Herself	Documentary film	
1970	The Phynx	Foxy		
1970	Pufnstuf	Boss Witch		
1979	The Concorde... Airport '79	Loretta		
1979	Skinflint: A Country Christmas Carol	Ghost of Christmas Past	Television film	
1980	The Gossip Columnist	Georgia O'Hanlon	Television film	
1981	Pippin: His Life and Times	Berthe	Television film	
1985	Alice in Wonderland	The Duchess	Television film	

=== Television ===
Year	Title	Role(s)	Notes	Ref.
1951–1953	Four Star Revue	Herself	Host	
1954–1956	The Martha Raye Show	Herself		
1955	What's My Line?	Herself	Mystery guest	
1958	Club Oasis	Herself		
1962	The Roy Rogers and Dale Evans Show	Herself	Episode: "Circus"	
1963	The Red Skelton Show	Herself		
1964	The Judy Garland Show	Herself		
1965	Password	Herself	1 episode	
1966	The Hollywood Palace	Herself	1 episode	
1967–1970	The Carol Burnett Show	Herself	3 episodes	
1970–1972	The Bugaloos	Benita Bizarre		
1976–1977	McMillan	Agatha		
1977	'Twas the Night Before Christmas	Nellie's mother	Television special	
1979–1984	Alice	Carrie Sharples		
1985	Murder, She Wrote	Sadie Winthrope		

== Stage credits ==
Year	Title	Role(s)	Notes	Ref.
1934	Calling All Stars	Performer	Hollywood Theatre	
1940	Hold On to Your Hats	Mamie	Shubert Theatre	
1951	Annie Get Your Gun	Annie	New York City Center	
1958	Anything Goes	Reno Sweeney	Televised production	
1962	Wildcat	Wildcat Jackson	Touring production	
1963	Call Me Madam	Cosmo Constantine	Touring production	
1964	The Solid Gold Cadillac		Regional production	
1967	Hello Dolly!	Mrs. Dolly Gallagher Levi	46th Street Theatre	
1968	Goodbye Charlie			
1969	Hello, Sucker!		Closed on the road	
1970	Everybody Loves Opal			
1972	No, No, Nanette	Pauline	46th Street Theatre	
1981	Pippin			
1982	4 Girls 4			
1983	Annie (1983)	Miss Hannigan	Regional tour	
1988	Everybody Loves Opal			

== Sources ==
- Parish, James Robert (1973). The Slapstick Queens. New York City, New York: A. S. Barnes. ISBN 978-0-498-01007-1.
- Pitrone, Jane Maddern (1999). Take It from the Big Mouth: The Life of Martha Raye. Lexington, Kentucky: University of Kentucky Press. ISBN 978-0-813-18957-4.
- Plaster, John L. (1997). SOG : The Secret Wars of America's Commandos in Vietnam. New York, New York: Simon & Schuster. ISBN 978-0-684-81105-5. OCLC 777435955.
- Tucker, David C. (2016). Martha Raye: Film and Television Clown. Jefferson, North Carolina: McFarland & Company. ISBN 978-0-786-49583-2.
