= Yokinen Show Trial =

1931 USA communist show trial

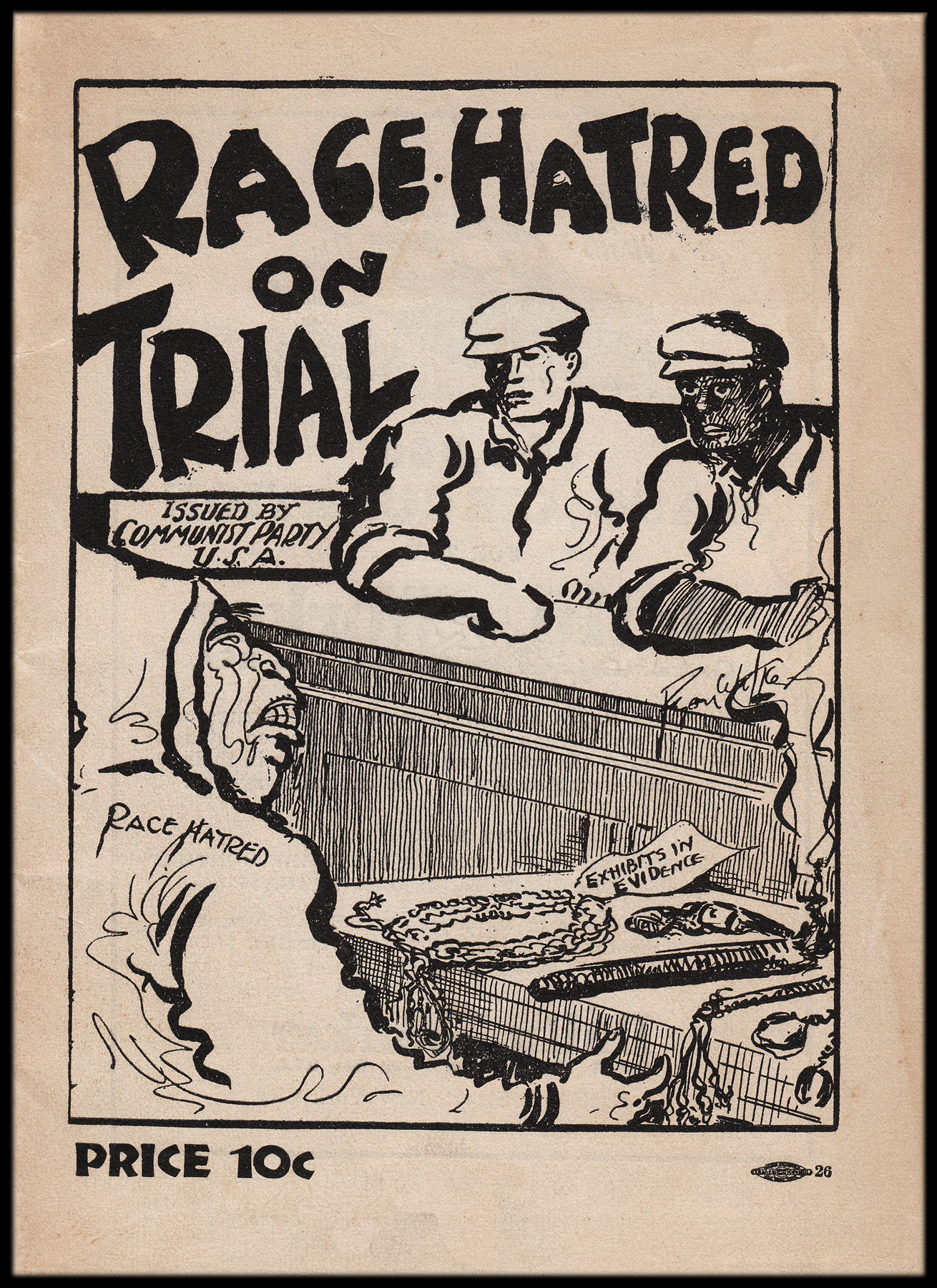
Cover of the Communist Party's pamphlet publicizing the 1931 Yokinen Show Trial, featuring art by cartoonist Ryan Walker.

The Yokinen Show Trial was a March 1931 public disciplinary proceeding conducted by leaders of the Communist Party, USA (CPUSA) against August Yokinen, a Finnish-American Communist janitor who allegedly denied several African Americans entry to a dance at the Finnish Workers Club in Harlem and made racially disparaging remarks against several African-American members of the organization at a social event. Attended by more an audience of 2,000 people, the "party trial" of Yokinen was publicized across America and was intended to emphasize the CPUSA's commitment to eliminate "White Chauvinism" from its ranks and to thereby bolster its status in the eyes of the black American working class and among white intellectuals seeking an end to racism.

For his actions Yokinen was expelled from the CPUSA for one year, with provision made for eventual readmission conditional upon active participation in the organization's anti-racist activities.

News of the "Yokinen Trial" was picked up by the Associated Press and publicized around the country. The event was also the subject of a pamphlet published by the CPUSA's publishing house, helping to establish the Soviet-style show trial as a seminal event in the history of American Communism during its ultra-radical Third Period of the early 1930s. This publicity attracted the attention of U.S. Immigration authorities, who immediately detained Yokinen for deportation on the grounds that he had violated terms of his entry into the country by holding membership in an organization advocating the use of "force and violence" to overthrow the United States government.

Yokinen was defended against these deportation charges by the same Communist Party which had inadvertently placed his immigration status in jeopardy through its International Labor Defense affiliate.

== History ==
=== Background ===
The early American Communist Party (CPUSA) was numerically dominated by a membership composed of European working class immigrants. Upwards of 90% of the party's founding membership were first and second generation immigrants who spoke languages other than English, participating in networks of local groups organized as semi-autonomous language federations — including in particular Russian, Lithuanian, Ukrainian, Latvian, South Slavic, and other groups. Additional mergers in 1921 of large sections of the Finnish Socialist Federation and Yiddish-speaking Jewish Socialist Federation further bolstered the non-English contingent of the American Communist movement.

By way of contrast, American Communist support among the black workers of the United States was extremely weak, limited to a small handful of radicals around the New York City-based African Blood Brotherhood, a number of whom were themselves immigrants to the country from the Caribbean basin. Talented American-born black radicals were few, a deficiency which galled the Moscow-based Executive Committee of the Communist International, which saw the hyper-exploited American black population as potentially fruitful grounds for the recruitment of new Communists.

At the behest of the Communist International, efforts were made by the CPUSA to gather African-American workers and intellectuals around a new mass organization known as the American Negro Labor Congress (ANLC) to centralize and steer the black workers' movement. This organization proved to have little success establishing a foothold in the black community, however, nor was it successful in advancing its leading agenda item, the ending of the anti-black racial exclusion rules practiced by a large percentage of American trade unions. Organizing efforts by the ANLC in the Harlem section of New York City directed at black apartment tenants in 1928 were only slightly more successful.

As the decade of the 1920s drew to a close, the Communist Party looked to renew its effort to win the allegiance of black Americans, beginning with a self-examination of the racial views and behaviors of its own members — the overwhelming majority of whom were ethnic immigrant whites.

=== The incident ===
Like many of the Finnish Federation's halls around the United States, the Communist Party-affiliated Finnish Workers Club of Harlem conducted a regular series of dances and social events on weekends. One such dance, held in January 1931, attracted the participation of three young black men, who were received less than hospitably by the Finnish-American regulars at such events. Amidst unfriendly stares, the music came to a halt and white couples scurried from the dance floor.

=== The "trial" ===
The Yokinen Trial was considered a turning point for the CPUSA’s ability to attract massive numbers of black workers and peasants. In 1931, a CP member, Yokinen, who was a caretaker at a Finnish Workers Hall near Harlem, refused black CP members entrance to a dance at the hall. After being criticized for this action, he maintained he was correct because the next step would be that blacks would ask admissions to the baths. The CP, according to Harry Haywood, used this specific case of racism to launch a struggle against white chauvinism in the party, and consolidate an understanding of the newly adopted position on the national question. A public trial was held on March 1, 1931 in Harlem in front of a “jury” of both white and black CP members (Yokinen was “represented” by a black CP lawyer) at which over 2000 party and non-party members attended. On the walls of the hall was a banner which read: “Race Inferiority is a White Ruling Class Lie: Smash the Jim Crow Laws and Practices.” The trial received wide attention in black newspapers as well as the bourgeois press. It demonstrated to the black community that the CP was one organization serious about fighting racism and according to Haywood was responsible for the party’s ability to initiate the Scottsboro Defense (see Cha. 12 of Black Bolshevik). This book is one of the few CP “memoirs” by a leading black communist and is an invaluable contribution to American communism. Haywood was one of the key figures behind the original formulation of the national question and in 1957 was a founding member of the Provisional Organizing Committee.

It should also be pointed out that at the trial Yokinen confessed to his crime and was expelled from the CP, but with the condition that if he engaged in the struggle against Jim Crow, he could be readmitted. He then proceeded to play an active role in the League for the Struggle for Negro Rights and was readmitted to the CP after six months. There is no question that the Yokinen Trial pushed the party forward in the anti-racist struggle both north and south. As one Marxist historian has written about its growth in Harlem: “although at the beginning of the depression it had only a handful of black members, by 1936 the Party had become an organization with influence in almost every dimension of Harlem’s political life.” Mark Naison, “Harlem Blacks and Communism,” Science & Society, 1978, p. 327).

=== The aftermath ===
Clearly following Soviet precedent, the Yokinen Show Trial was billed in an Associated Press report as the "first mass trial staged by Communists in America." Prosecutor Hathaway's assertion that Yokinen had "made formal acceptance of the communistic principle of equal rights" and his defense council Moore's plea against Yokinen's expulsion from membership in the Communist Party was duly reported in this widely republished account. These details piqued the interest of members of the conservative Herbert Hoover administration, public concern about the American Communist Party having been stoked by the hearings of the House Un-American Activities Committee the previous year.

Yokinen was immediately arrested after the trial by federal immigration officials and lodged at Ellis Island, New York, for deportation hearings on charges that the immigrant had held membership in an organization advocating the overthrow of the United States government by force and violence, thereby violating terms of his entry into America. In July 1931 Commissioner General of the Immigration Department Harry E. Hull ruled against Yokinen and ordered his deportation to Finland. This decision was appealed by the Communist Party's legal defense arm, International Labor Defense (ILD), working through the party-friendly New York legal firm of Shorr, Brodsky, and King.

Despite the fact that he had married in the United States and his wife had given birth to a daughter on American soil (making her a citizen of that country), the deportation order against Yokinen was sustained in New York's highest court. This decision was to be appealed to the United States Supreme Court, it was announced in the press.

Yokinen was deported to Finland, but he continued on to Petrozavodsk in Soviet Karelia.

== See also ==
- Non-English press of the Communist Party USA
