= Maurice Becker =

American cartoonist (1889–1975)

Maurice Becker (1889 – August 28, 1975) was an American radical political artist best known for his work in the 1910s and 1920s for such publications as The Masses and The Liberator.

== Biography ==
=== Early years ===
Maurice Becker was born in Nizhni-Novgorod, Russia, the son of ethnic Jewish parents. The family emigrated from Russia to the United States in 1892, moving to the Jewish community of the Lower East Side of New York City. His older sister Helen Tamiris was a modern dance pioneer and his brother Sam Becker was a sculptor.

The young Maurice took night classes in bookkeeping and art while working days as a sign painter. He worked as an artist for the New York Tribune from 1914 to 1915, and for the Scripps newspapers from 1915 to 1918. He also contribute artwork on a freelance basis to a broad range of contemporary publications, including Harper's Weekly, Metropolitan magazine, and The Saturday Evening Post.

=== Radical art ===
Becker cartoon published in The Masses, March 1913.

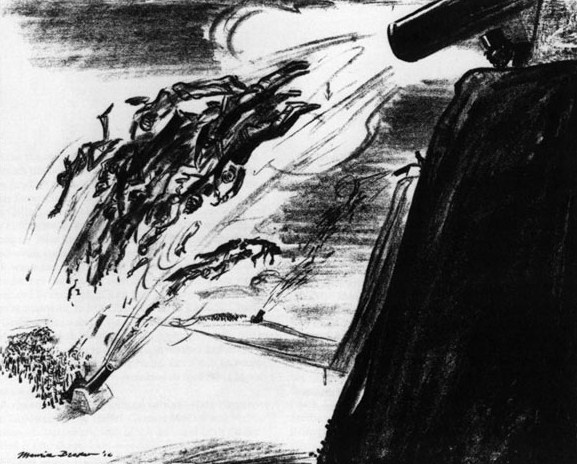
Ammunition (1914) by Maurice Becker,

Maurice Becker is best remembered as an illustrator for radical magazines, most famously for the New York political and artistic magazine The Masses, to which he began to contribute in 1911.

He married Dorothy Baldwin, an active Socialist, in 1918. That same year he became a conscientious objector to American participation in World War I. He fled to Mexico to avoid the draft. He was arrested upon his return to the United States in 1919 and was tried, convicted, and sentenced to 25 years of hard labor, of which he served 4 months at Fort Leavenworth prior to commutation of his sentence.

Becker was a frequent contributor to the radical press, publishing his art in such periodicals as Revolt, The Toiler, New Solidarity, The Blast, Survey Graphic, The New York Call. and The New Masses. Becker's work, which often made use of the muted tones of graphite or charcoal, was likewise generally softer in political tone than the more hard-edged and biting work of his peers, who included Art Young, Fred Ellis, Robert Minor, Hugo Gellert, and William Gropper.

From 1921 to 1923, Becker lived in Mexico, where he worked as an artist for El Pulsa de México, an English-language magazine. After that time, he dedicated himself to painting full-time, essentially ending his career as a political artist for magazines. He did occasionally contribute art to political publications after that date, however, such as an apolitical drawing entitled "Summer," which ran in the August 1926 issue of The New Masses.

Becker remained a political radical throughout his life and was either a member or a fellow traveler of the Communist Party USA for many years. He visited the Soviet Union in 1931. In 1932, Becker Joined The League of Professional Groups for Foster and Ford, officially endorsing Communist candidate William Z. Foster for President of the United States. In 1936, he likewise endorsed Communist candidate Earl Browder as a member of the Committee of Professional Groups for Browder and Ford. His name appeared on the letterhead of the Artists' Front to Win the War, a mass organization closely linked to the Communist Party, and he was a signatory to the call for formation of the American Artists' Congress, a party-backed initiative.

Maurice Becker died at the Jewish Home of Eastern Pennsylvania in Scranton.
