= Daily Worker =

American left-wing newspaper (1924–1958)

- No. 254 of the Daily Worker (November 7, 1927)
- Type: Daily newspaper
- Format: Broadsheet and tabloid
- Founded: 1924; 102 years ago
- Ceased publication: January 1958
- Political alignment: Communist; socialist
- Language: English
- Headquarters: Chicago, Illinois; New York City, New York
- Circulation: Various

The Daily Worker was a leftist newspaper published in Chicago and later in New York City. Founded in 1924 by communists, socialists, union members, and other activists, the newspaper throughout its existence generally promoted the views of the Communist Party USA (CPUSA), although it also reflected a broader spectrum of left-wing opinion.

At its peak, the Daily Worker achieved a circulation of 35,000. Contributors to its pages included Robert Minor and Fred Ellis (cartoonists), Lester Rodney (sports editor), David Karr, Richard Wright, John L. Spivak, Peter Fryer, Woody Guthrie, and Louis F. Budenz. The newspaper ceased daily publication in 1958 and transitioned to weekly frequency under various names until 2010. Since then, several online news and opinion outlets have claimed to be the Daily Worker's legitimate successor.

Materials published by the Daily Worker prior to 1964 are in the public domain due to nonrenewal of their copyright status.

== History ==
=== Origins ===
The Daily Worker originated as a weekly newspaper, the Ohio Socialist, published in Cleveland by the Socialist Party of Ohio from 1917 to November 1919. The Ohio Party joined the nascent Communist Labor Party of America (CLP) at the 1919 Emergency National Convention.

The Ohio Socialist was renamed Toiler in November 1919. The last Ohio Socialist issue was #94 November 19, 1919. The Toiler continued this numbering sequence (although a typographical error caused its debut issue on November 26, 1919 to be #85 instead of #95). In 1921, the volume 'IV' was added, perhaps indicating the publication's fourth year in print. The issue numbers kept incrementing. The final edition of the Toiler was Vol. IV #207 January 28, 1922. The Worker continued the Toiler's numbering during its run: Vol. IV #208 February 2, 1922 to Vol. VI #310 January 12, 1924. The first Daily Worker edition was Vol. I #311.

In 1920, with the CLP going underground, Toiler served as the Party's "aboveground" newspaper, put out by "The Toiler Publishing Association". It remained the paper of the CLP and its successors until February 1922.

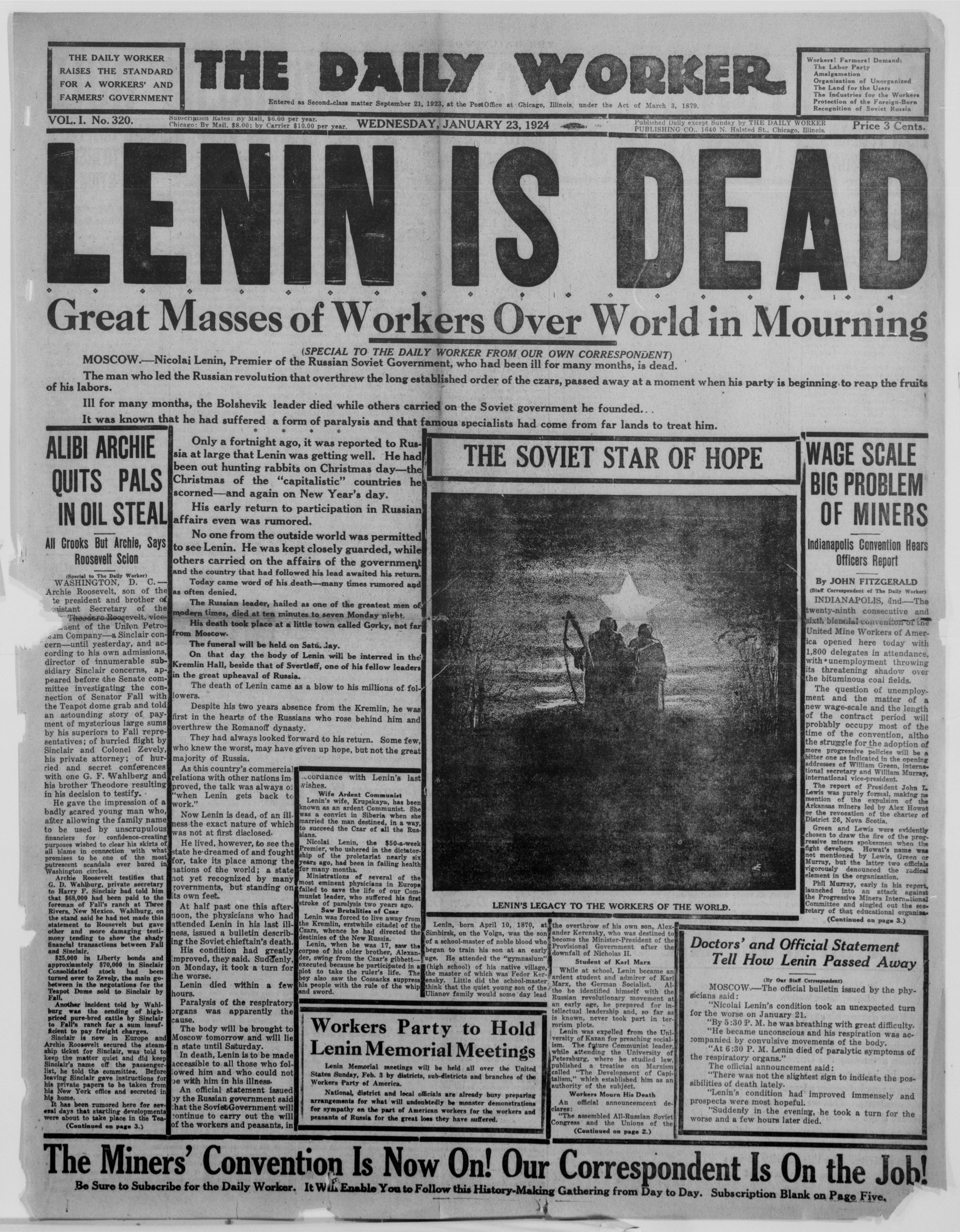
January 23, 1924, edition, covering the death of Vladimir Lenin

In December 1921 the Workers Party of America was founded and the Toiler merged with the biweekly Workers Council of the Workers' Council of the United States to found a six-page weekly, The Worker, published out of Chicago. On January 13, 1924, it was converted to daily frequency and relaunched as the Daily Worker, using $100,000 that had been raised from an assortment of Communist-led groups.

In 1927, the Daily Worker headquarters moved from Chicago to New York City.

=== Popular front changes ===
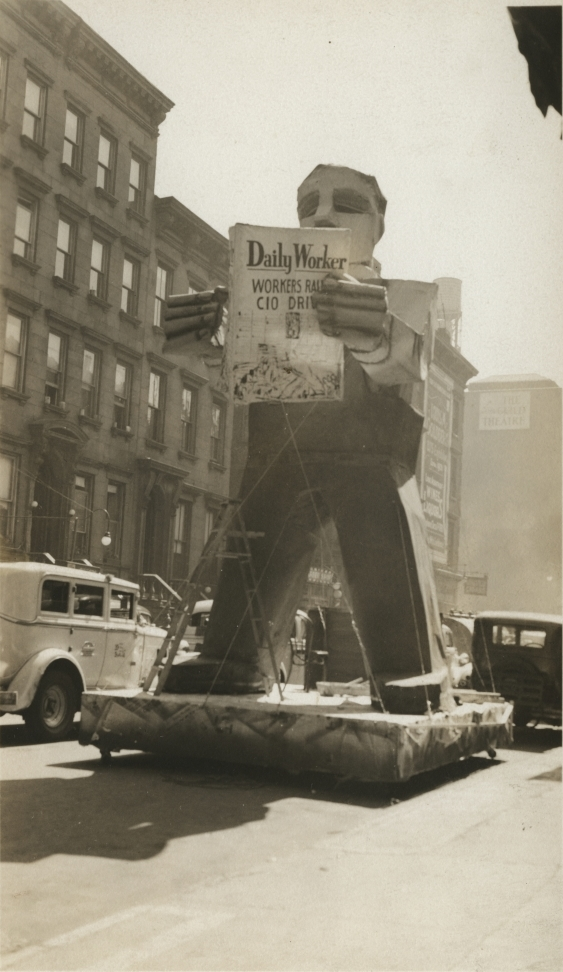
May Day parade float with statue reading the Daily Worker

Beginning in the popular front period of the 1930s, the Daily Worker broadened its coverage of the arts and entertainment. In 1935, it added comic strips and a sports page. With contributions from David Karr, the sports page was edited and often written by Lester Rodney. The sports coverage combined enthusiasm for baseball with the usual Marxist social critique of capitalist society and bourgeois attitudes. It advocated for the desegregation of professional sports.

=== Post-World War II ===
The McCarthy era compelled many subscribers to switch to less notoriously "Red" newspapers, and circulation of the Daily Worker dropped below 10,000. Finally, in January 1958, the paper stopped publication. On the cover of its final issue on January 13, the editorial board said it had been overwhelmed by "the financial burden on a shrinking Left-Wing movement beset by internal difficulties."

Later that year, the Party introduced a weekend paper called The Worker, which ran till 1968. A Tuesday edition called The Midweek Worker was added in 1961, and also operated through 1968.

=== Two newspapers and a merger ===
In 1968, the publication was resumed as a New York daily paper, titled Daily World. In 1986 it merged with the West Coast weekly paper, the People's World, forming the People's Daily World. It lasted until 1991 when daily publication ended. The new paper was cut back to weekly frequency and retitled People's Weekly World (later retitled People's World as to de-emphasize the weekly component).

=== Later claims of successors ===
Print publication of People's World ceased in 2010 in favor of an online edition. As of 2012, People's World claims that, "Peoplesworld.org is a daily news website of, for and by the 99% and the direct descendant of the Daily Worker." Its publisher is Long View Publishing Company. The online newspaper is a member of the International Labor Communications Association and is indexed in the Alternative Press Index. Its staff members belong to the Newspaper Guild/CWA, AFL–CIO.

Another publication, both in print as The Worker and online as Daily Worker USA, states that it is "Continuing The Daily Worker, Founded in 1924." The Worker is the Publication of the Central Committee of the Party of Communists USA, which itself claims to be continuing the legacy of the old CPUSA, and The Worker has been printed and distributed since at least 2020.

== Leadership ==
=== Editors ===
1924–1928	J. Louis Engdahl
1925–1936	William F. Dunne
1928–1930	Robert Minor
1931–1932	William Weinstone
1930, 1933–1940	Clarence Hathaway
1940–1945	Louis F. Budenz
1945–1947	Morris Childs
1947–1958	John Gates
1956–1958	Si Gerson

== Staff ==
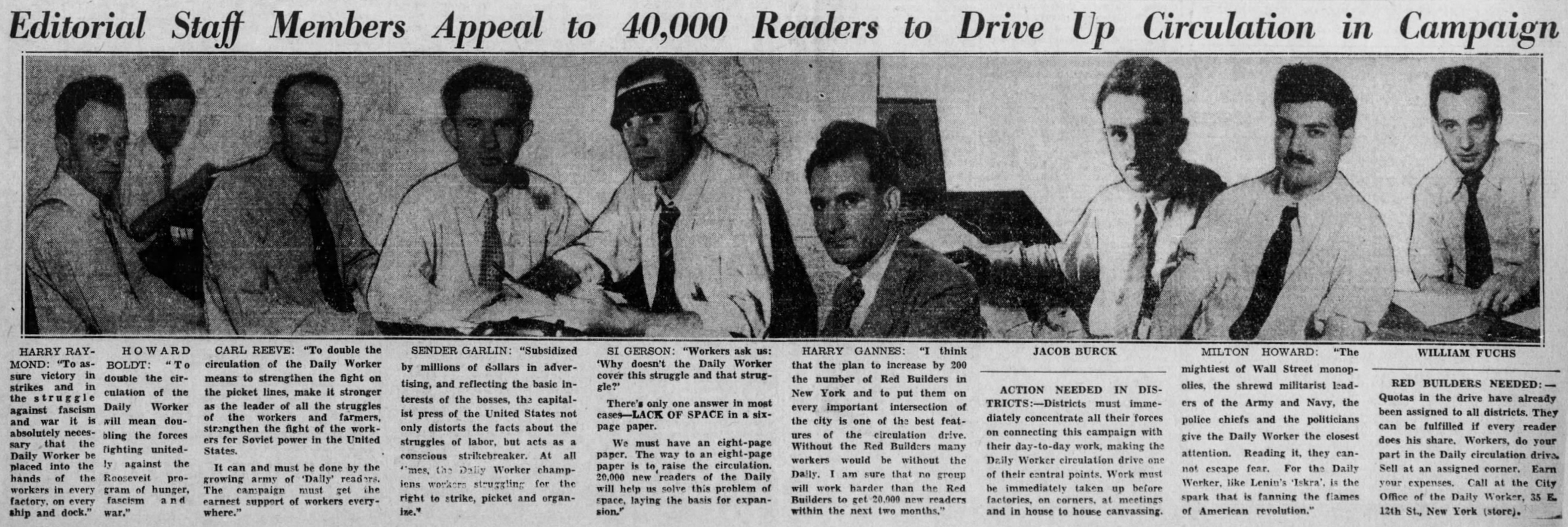
Editorial staff members of the Daily Worker, 1934.
(L-R): Harry Raymond, Howard Boldt, Carl Reeve, Sender Garlin, Si Gerson, Harry Gannes, Jacob Burck, Milton Howard, and William Fuchs.

=== 1920s ===
- Martin Abern
- Maurice Becker, cartoonist
- Max Bedacht, contributor
- Alexander Bittelman, magazine editor
- Ella Reeve Bloor
- Jacob Burck, cartoonist
- Walt Carmon, circulation manager
- Ann Washington Craton, contributor
- Whittaker Chambers
- Kyle Crichton as "Robert Forsythe" (father of Robert Crichton)
- Paul Crouch
- Samuel Adams Darcy
- Nicholas Dozenberg, business manager
- William F. Dunne, editor
- Fred Ellis, cartoonist
- J. Louis Engdahl, editor
- Lovett Fort-Whiteman, contributor
- Harry Freeman
- Sender Garlin
- Hugo Gellert, cartoonist
- Harrison George
- Mike Gold, columnist
- William Gropper, cartoonist
- Jolan Gross-Bettelheim, cartoonist
- Ji Chaoding, contributor
- L. E. Katterfeld ("New York representative")
- Sergey Kurnakov, military affairs
- A. B. Magil
- Benjamin Mandel, business manager
- Robert Minor, cartoonist
- Richard B. Moore
- Paul Novick
- Harvey O'Connor ("effective editor")
- Tom Maidhc O'Flaherty, columnist
- Moissaye Joseph Olgin
- Edwin Rolfe
- Max Shachtman
- Esther Shemitz, cartoonist
- Bertram Wolfe

=== 1930s ===
- James S. Allen, foreign news writer
- Robert Bendiner
- Michael Blankfort, contributor
- Richard O. Boyer
- Sam Brody, film critic
- Nathaniel Buchwald, Moscow correspondent
- Louis F. Budenz, managing editor
- Ben Burns
- Samuel Adams Darcy, editor
- Benjamin J. Davis Jr.
- Theodore Draper, assistant foreign editor
- Theodore Dreiser
- Lou Ferstadt, cartoonist
- Frederick Vanderbilt Field
- Elizabeth Gurley Flynn, columnist
- Nelson Frank
- Nat Ganley
- Harry Gannes, foreign editor
- James Glaser, managing editor
- Si Gerson
- Eugene Gordon
- Woody Guthrie, "Woody Sez" columnist for People's World
- Clarence Hathaway, editor
- Syd Hoff, cartoonist
- Jacob Kainen, cartoonist
- David Karr
- Jay Richard Kennedy, circulation manager
- Sergey Nikolaevich Kurnakov
- Avrom Landy, New York City editor
- John Howard Lawson
- Edna Lewis
- Walter Lowenfels
- Maud Malone, librarian
- Max Margulis, music critic
- J. B. Matthews, contributor
- George Morris, labor editor
- Felix Morrow
- Joseph North, columnist
- Pablo O'Higgins, illustrator
- Brian O'Neill, contributor
- Myra Page, contributor
- Harry Alan Potamkin, film critic
- Samuel Putnam
- Al Richmond
- Lester Rodney, sports writer
- Edwin Rolfe
- Muriel Rukeyser
- Howard Rushmore
- Samuel Sillen, contributor
- Charles Edward Smith, music critic
- Vern Smith, Moscow correspondent
- John L. Spivak
- Carolyn Lloyd Strobell, contributor
- Ryan Walker, cartoonist/editor
- William Weinstone, editor
- Alden Whitman, book critic
- Richard Wright, Harlem editor
- Marguerite Young, Washington DC bureau chief

=== 1940s ===
- Edith Anderson-Schröder, culture editor
- Phil Bard, advertising manager
- Isidore Begun, columnist
- Abner Berry, negro affairs editor
- Dick Briefer, cartoonist
- Earl Browder, contributor
- Morris Childs, editor
- Benjamin J. Davis Jr., president
- Pele de Lappe, illustrator
- Peggy Dennis, women's editor
- Frederick Vanderbilt Field
- Sidney Finkelstein, music critic
- James W. Ford, contributor
- Si Gerson
- Irving Goff, contributor
- Louis Harap, contributor
- Grace Hutchins, contributor
- Jim Kepner
- Harvey Kurtzman, cartoonist
- Edna Lewis
- Bill Mardo
- Mike Quin, contributor
- Alexander Saxton
- Edwin Seaver
- Jack Stachel, associate editor
- Joseph Starobin, foreign editor
- Carolyn Lloyd Strobell, owner
- Dalton Trumbo, contributor
- Theodore Ward
- Alden Whitman, book critic
- Milton Wolff, culture editor
- Jose Yglesias, film critic

=== 1950s ===
- Joseph Clark, foreign editor
- Jesús Colón, columnist
- Howard Fast
- Peter Fryer, contributor
- John Gates, editor
- Si Gerson, executive editor
- Claudia Jones, columnist
- Douglas Turner Ward, reporter
- Charles W. White, cartoonist

== Salespeople gallery ==
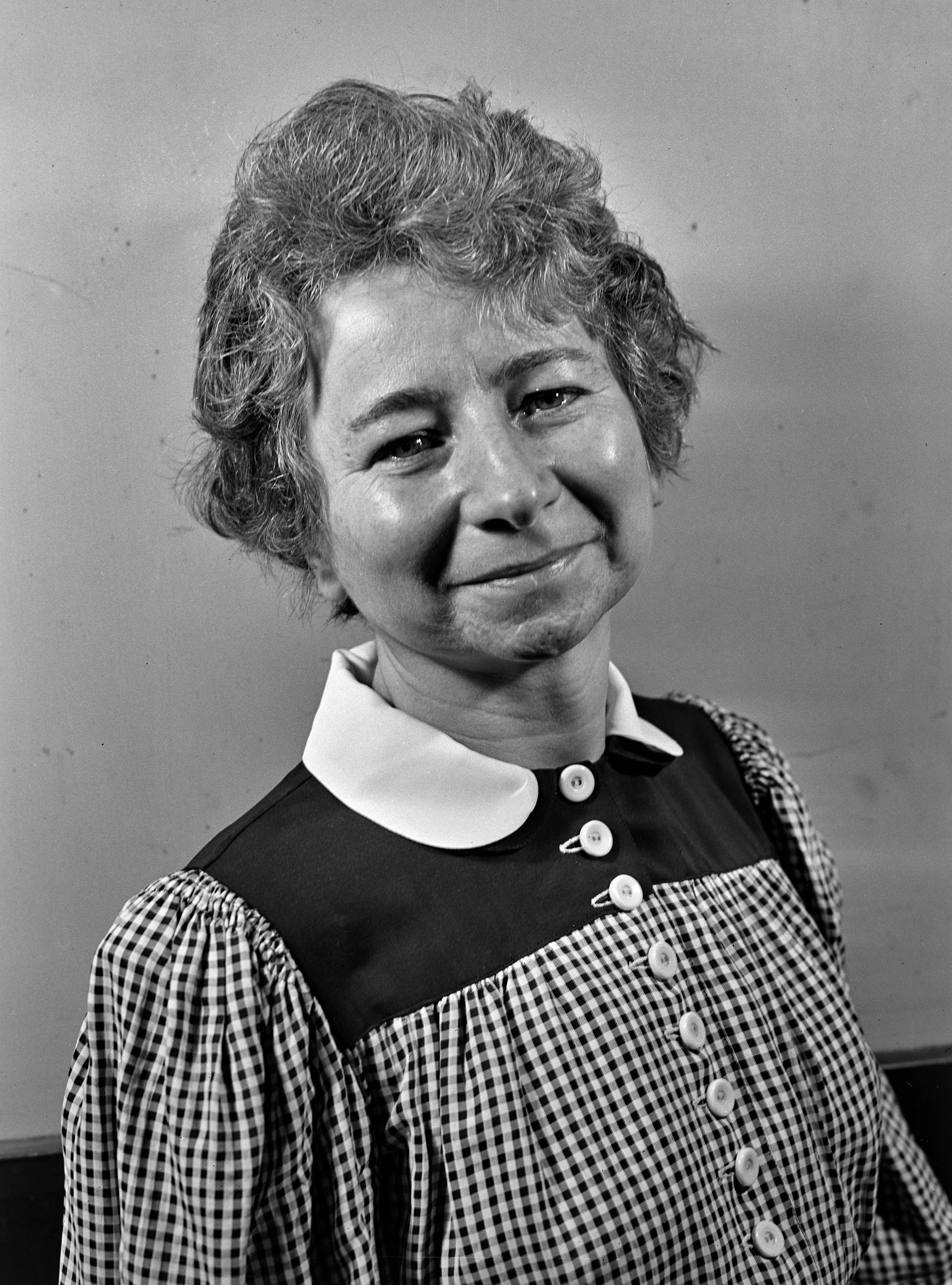
Rose Rabinowitz
March 25, 1943

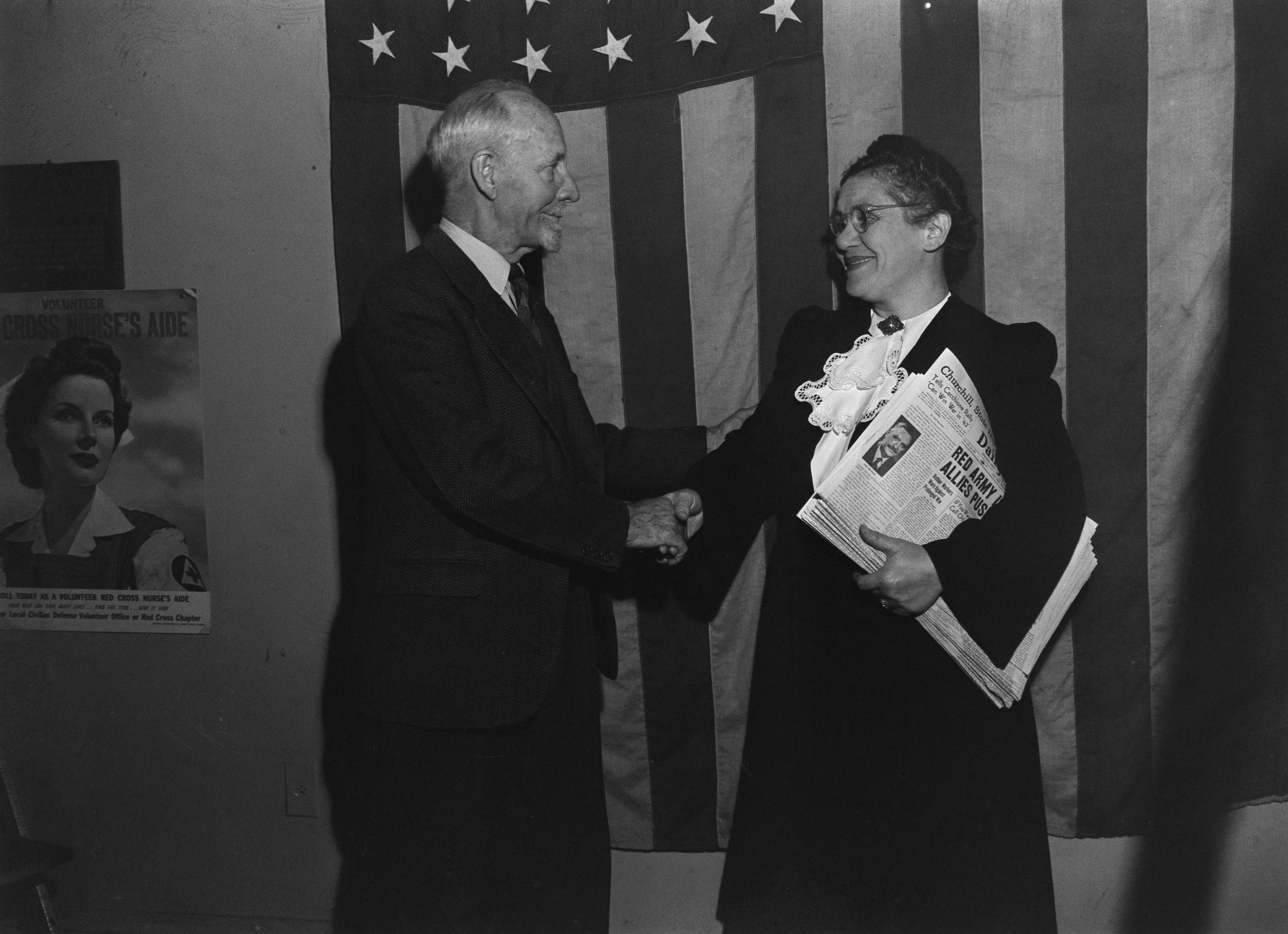
Mildred Schwab (right)
September 27, 1946

Jack Feldstein
September 30, 1946

Jack Stone
September 30, 1946

Benjamin Heyman
October 23, 1946

== Pamphlets (through 1927) ==
Before establishing Workers Library Publishers in late 1927, the Party used the Daily Worker Publishing Company to produce and distribute pamphlets:

- The State and Revolution: Marxist teaching on the state and the task of the proletariat in the revolution by Vladimir Lenin. Chicago: Daily Worker Pub. Co., 1924
- The white terrorists ask for mercy. Chicago; Published for the Workers Party of America by the Daily Worker Pub. Co. Feb 1925
- Trade unions in America by William Z. Foster, Earl Browder and James Cannon. Chicago: Published for the Trade Union Educational League by the Daily Worker 1925 (Little red library #1) alternate link
- Class Struggle vs. Class Collaboration by Earl Browder. Chicago: Published for the Workers Party of America by the Daily Worker Publishing Company, 1925 (The little red library #2) alternate link
- Principles of Communism: Engels's Original Draft of the Communist Manifesto translated by Max Bedacht. Chicago: Published for the Workers Party of America by the Daily Worker 1925. (Little Red Library #3) alternate link
- Worker Correspondents: What? When? Where? Why? How? by William F. Dunne. Chicago: Published for the Workers Party of America by the Daily Worker Pub. Co., 1925 (The Little red library #4) alternate link
- Poems for workers, an anthology edited by Manuel Gomez. Chicago: Published for Workers Party of America by Daily Worker Pub. Co., 1925 (Little Red Library #5)
- The theory and practice of Leninism by Joseph Stalin. Chicago: Published for the Workers Party of America by the Daily Worker Pub. Co., 1925
- The Party Organization. Chicago: Published for the Workers (Communist) Party by the Daily Worker Publishing Co. 1925
- Leninism or Trotskyism by Joseph Stalin, Lev Kamenev, and Grigory Zinovyev. Chicago: Published for the Workers Party of America by the Daily Worker Pub. Co., 1925
- Lenin: his life and work by Yemelyan Yaroslavsky. Chicago: Daily Worker Pub. Co., 1925
- The Movement for World Trade Union Unity by Tom Bell. Chicago: Daily Worker Pub. Co., 1925
- British imperialism in India; speech delivered in the House of Commons, July 9, 1925 by Shapurji Saklatvala. Chicago: Daily Worker Pub. Co., 1925
- Fairy tales for workers' children by Hermynia Zur Mühlen, translated by Ida Dailes. Chicago: Daily Worker Pub. Co., 1925
- The fourth national convention of the Workers (Communist) Party of America : Report of the Central Executive Committee to the 4th national convention held in Chicago, Illinois, August 21st to 30th, 1925: resolutions of the Parity Commission and others. Chicago: Daily Worker Pub. Co., 1925
- From the Third through the Fourth Convention of the Workers (Communist) Party of America by Charles E. Ruthenberg. Chicago: Published for the Workers (Communist) Party of America by the Daily Worker Pub. Co., 1925
- The International: Words and Music. [New York]: Daily Worker New York Agency, Dec 1925
- Marx and Engels on revolution in America by Heinz Neumann. Chicago : Daily Worker Pub. Co., 1926 (The little red library #6) alternate link
- The damned agitator and other stories by Michael Gold. Chicago : Daily Worker Pub. Co., 1926 (The little red library #7) alternate link
- 1871: the Paris commune by Max Shachtman. Chicago: Daily Worker Pub. Co. 1926 (The little red library #8) alternate link
- How class collaboration works by Bertram David Wolfe. Chicago: Daily Worker Pub. Co. 1926 (The little red library #9) alternate link
- The menace of opportunism; a contribution to the bolshevization of the Workers (Communist) Party by Max Bedacht. Chicago: Daily Worker Pub. Co., 1926
- The British strike: its background, its lessons by William F. Dunne. Chicago: Daily Worker Pub. Co., 1926
- Passaic: The Story of a Struggle against Starvation Wages and for the Right to Organize by Albert Weisbord. Chicago; Published for the Workers (Communist) Party by the Daily Worker Pub. Co., November 1926.
- Red cartoons from the Daily Worker, the Workers Monthly and the Liberator: Communist publications. Chicago: Daily Worker Pub. Co., 1926
- The awakening of China by James Dolsen. Chicago: Daily Worker Pub. Co., 1926
- Labor conditions in China and its labor movement by James Dolsen. Chicago: Daily Worker Pub. Co., 1926
- Lenin on organization by Vladimir Lenin. Chicago: Daily Worker Pub. Co., 1926
- Elements of political education. Vol. I by Nikolai Bukharin, A. Berdnikov, and F. Svetlov. Chicago: Daily Worker, 1926
- The case of Sacco and Vanzetti in cartoons from the Daily Worker by Fred Ellis. Chicago: Daily Worker, 1927 alternate link
- Constitution of the U.S.S.R. by V. Yarotsky and N. Yekovsky. Chicago: Daily Worker, 1927 (The little red library #10) alternate link
- Jim Connolly and the Irish rising of 1916 by G. Schüller. Chicago: Daily Worker Pub. Co., 1926 (The little red library # 11) alternate link
- Red cartoons of 1927 from the Daily Worker and the Workers Monthly. Chicago; New York: Daily Worker Pub. Co., 1927
- China in revolt by Executive Committee of the Communist International. New York, Daily Worker Pub. Co., 1927 The little red library #12
- The Labor Lieutenants of American Imperialism by Jay Lovestone. New York: Daily Worker Publishing Co., 1927

== Later publications ==
- Red cartoons from the Daily Worker 1928 New York: Daily Worker, 1928
- 1929 Red cartoons: reprinted from the Daily Worker New York: Comprodaily Pub. Co., 1929
- How to sell the Daily Worker. New York, Daily Worker, 1920s
- Burning Daylight by Jack London. New York, Daily Worker, 1930s
- "Soviet dumping" fable: speech by Litvinov. New York: Published for Daily Worker by Workers Library Publishers, 1931
- Anti-soviet lies and the five-year plan: the "Holy" capitalist war against the Soviet Union by Max Bedacht New York: Published for Daily Worker by Workers Library Publishers, 1931
- Dimitroff accuses by Georgi Dimitrov. New York, Daily Worker, 1934
- The Iron Heel by Jack London. New York, Daily Worker, 1934
- The Ruling Clawss by A. Redfield. New York, Daily Worker, 1935 (cartoons)
- Hunger and revolt: cartoons by Jacob Burck. New York, Daily Worker, 1935
- Martin Eden by Jack London. New York, Daily Worker, 1937
- How the Auto Workers Won by William Z. Foster. New York: The Daily Worker, 1937
- The Daily Worker, heir to the great tradition by Morris Schappes. New York, Daily Worker, 1944
- Dixie comes to New York: story of the Freeport GI slayings by Harry Raymond; intro. by Benjamin Davis. New York, Daily Worker, 1946
- The killing of William Milton by Art Shields. New York, Daily Worker, 1948
- The Ingrams shall not die!: story of Georgia's new terror by Harry Raymond; intro. by Benjamin J. Davis. New York, Daily Worker, 1948
- A Tale of Two Waterfronts by George Morris (1952)
- "Throw the bum out": official Communist Party line on Senator McCarthy. New York, Daily Worker, 1953–1954

== See also ==
- Earl Browder
- Louis F. Budenz: editor in early 1940s
- Jacob Burck: cartoonist in the 1920s and 1930s
- Whittaker Chambers: foreign editor in the 1920s
- Gus Hall
- David Karr
- People's World
- Lester Rodney: sports writer/editor
- "The Race" (Seinfeld): television episode prominently featuring the Daily Worker
