= Abner Berry =

American journalist and Communist Party organizer

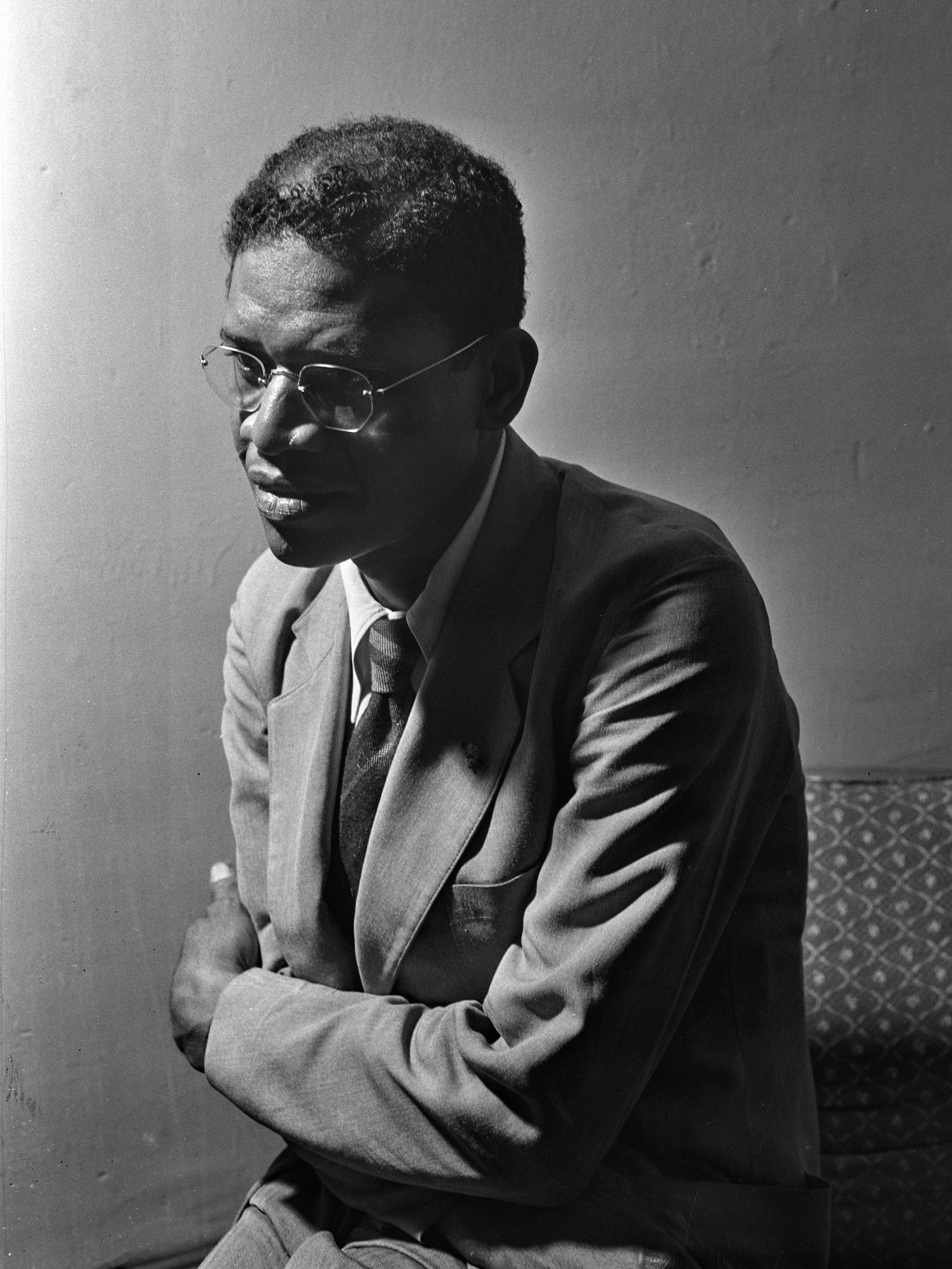
Berry in 1947

Abner W. Berry (June 12, 1902 – June 24, 1987) was an American journalist and Communist Party organizer.

== Biography ==
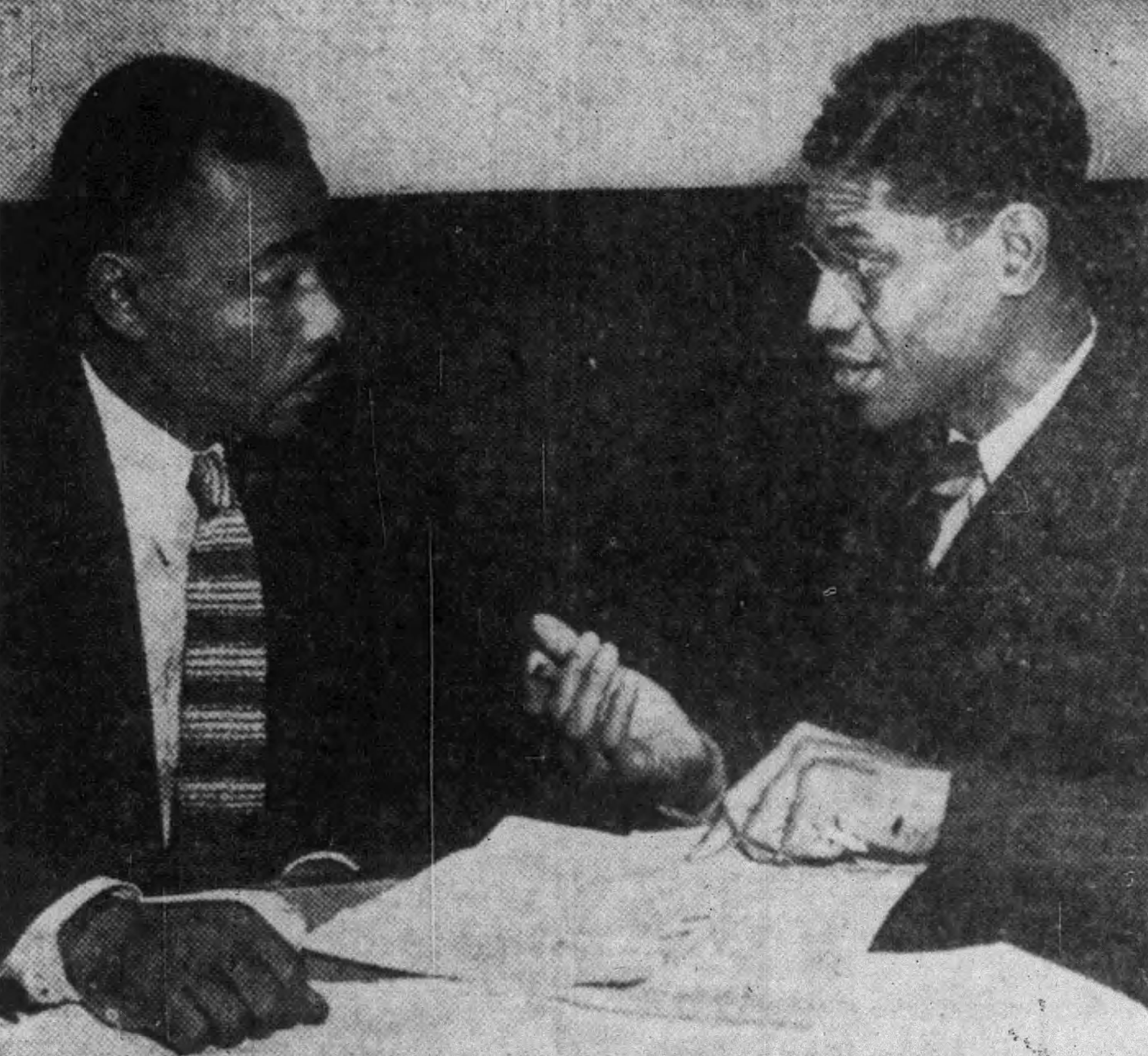
Claude Lightfoot (left) and Berry, competing for Daily Worker subscriptions in Chicago's South Side and Harlem, respectively, October 4, 1941

Berry was born in Texas where his three siblings performed as the musical trio The Berry Brothers. After working in a factory, Berry began his career as a journalist in Houston. Berry moved from Kansas City to Harlem in 1935 to work for the League of Struggle for Negro Rights. He replaced Harry Haywood as the leader of the group. In Harlem, Berry worked to organize support for Ethiopia against Italy during the Second Italo-Ethiopian War. At the same time, Berry was critical of aspects of Ethiopian society, opposing its use of slavery and feudalism.

Berry was an active member of the Communist Party, working on efforts to encourage social and political interaction between white and Black Party members. He eventually became the Negro Affairs Editor for the Daily Worker.

In September 1957, Berry was photographed in a group with Martin Luther King Jr. at the Highlander School, leading to accusations that King attended a "Communist Training School".

In January 1958, Berry resigned from the Communist Party along with John Gates and Lester Rodney, in response to Khruschev's Secret Speech and its revelations about Stalinism. Berry worked for the United Nations in 1960, organizing the Afro News Service which focused on stories about African politics.

Berry died in Rocky Mount, North Carolina, following a stroke.
