= Carolyn Lloyd Strobell =

- Born: Carolyn Augusta Lloyd c. 1859; Pekin, Illinois
- Died: 1940; Little Compton, Rhode Island
- Occupations: Teacher; writer; activist

Carolyn Augusta Strobell (née Lloyd; c. 1859 – 1940) was an American author and activist. She was a member of the American Socialist Party and, after 1935, the Communist Party. She published a biography of her brother, the Socialist leader Henry Demarest Lloyd, in 1912. In 1940 she became an owner of the Communist Party's newspaper, The Daily Worker.

== Biography ==
=== Early life ===
Carolyn Augusta Lloyd was born in 1859 in Pekin, Illinois to Aaron Lloyd, a minister of the Dutch Reformed Church and bookstore owner, and Maria Christie (née Demarest) Lloyd. She attended Vassar College, graduating in 1881. She moved to Paris, where she attended the Sorbonne, taught school, and wrote articles for several American magazines. She returned to the United States in 1887, teaching school in Evanston, Illinois and Newark, New Jersey.

=== Marriage and children ===
She married Lothrop Withington, a professional genealogist, in Paris, in 1892 and lived with him there and in England; they divorced in 1910. In 1915 she married George Strobell, a manufacturing jeweler who had run for mayor of Newark on the Socialist ticket, and who later became the manager of the Socialist Party of America's Rand School of Social Sciences. He would die in Russia in 1925, working on Soviet farm reconstruction.

=== Later life ===
Strobell lived in New York City and summered in Little Compton, Rhode Island. In addition to her writing, she worked for the Committee on Maternal Health of the New York Academy of Medicine, researching for a book on birth control.

In Little Compton, she was a member of the Little Compton Garden Club and part of the summer colony that centered on her brother's family's home, a center for socialists and other radicals.

== Political activism and writings ==
Strobell began writing for magazines and political journals when she lived in Paris, and continued to write for the rest of her life. Her first essays were for The Outlook on topics including "the organization of the Workingwomen of Paris", encouraging their unionization, and "the club for American girls studying in Paris".

She became a socialist in England in 1898 and a member of the Socialist Party in 1906. She was an editor of The Intercollegiate Socialist, the magazine of the Intercollegiate Socialist Society, writing many reviews and articles with titles like “War Collectivism in England”, “Concerning the German Revolution”, and “Karl Marx”. Other work appeared in, among other publications, The Socialist Review, The Chicago Tribune, The New York Evening Post, The Springfield Republican, The Brooklyn Standard Union, and New York Call. Her essays, often a combination of personal observation and politics, were reprinted in many papers.

In 1912, Strobell published Henry Demarest Lloyd, 1847-1903; A Biography. She collected his papers, which are now at the Wisconsin Historical Society.

Strobell left the Socialist party in 1925 and joined the Communist party in 1935, contributing many articles to the party's official newspaper, The Daily Worker.

A family member recalled that “men in dark suits” came to visit her in Little Compton, bringing writing assignments and asking for money.

In 1940, at the age of 81, Strobell bought The Daily Worker along with two friends, also elderly women, to protect it from government attacks on the Communist Party.

== Published works ==
- Lloyd, C. (1912). Henry Demarest Lloyd, 1847-1903: A biography. New York: G.P. Putnam's Sons.
