= The Liberator (magazine) =

Monthly socialist magazine established by Max and Crystal Eastman in 1918

- Debut issue, March 1918, with cover art by Hugo Gellert.
- Editor: Max Eastman (1918–22); Floyd Dell (1922); Robert Minor (1922–24)
- Staff writers: Cornelia Barns; Howard Brubaker; Dorothy Day; Hugo Gellert; Arturo Giovannitti; Charles T. Hallinan; Ellen La Motte; Robert Minor; John Reed; Boardman Robinson; Louis Untermeyer; Charles W. Wood; Art Young
- Categories: Politics
- Frequency: Monthly
- First issue: March 1918
- Final issue: October 1924
- Company: Liberator Publishing Co. (1918–1922), Workers Party of America (1922–1924)

The Liberator was a monthly socialist magazine published from 1918 to 1924. It was established by Max Eastman and his sister Crystal Eastman in 1918 to continue the work of The Masses, which was shut down by the wartime mailing regulations of the U.S. government. Intensely political, the magazine included copious quantities of art, poetry, and fiction along with political reporting and commentary. The publication was an organ of the Communist Party of America (CPA) from late 1922 and was merged with two other publications to form The Workers Monthly in 1924.

== History ==
The Liberator focused on international news, featuring war correspondent and Communist Labor Party founder John Reed reporting on the ongoing situation in Soviet Russia; reports were filed from across post-war Europe by Robert Minor, Frederick Kuh, and Crystal Eastman.

As with The Masses, The Liberator relied heavily upon political art, including contributions from Maurice Becker, E.E. Cummings, John Dos Passos, Fred Ellis, Lydia Gibson, William Gropper, Ernest Hemingway, Helen Keller, J.J. Lankes, Boardman Robinson, Edmund Wilson, Wanda Gág, and Art Young. Each color cardstock cover of The Liberator was unique. Poetry and fiction fleshed out its pages, including work by Carl Sandburg, Claude McKay, Arturo Giovannitti, and others.

Maintaining a low price for the elaborate publication came at a huge cost, however. To economize, ultra-thin newsprint was used for the magazine's pages — cheap and high in acid content. The result was a fragile and ephemeral publication. Despite a circulation that peaked at 60,000 copies per month, comparatively few specimens of The Liberator have survived.

The Liberator ran into trouble in 1922—both financial and motivational, as editor Max Eastman's interests shifted from the mundane work of editing to book writing. Eastman ceded his editorial blue pencil around January 1, 1922, with literary critic Floyd Dell taking over the job. Throughout 1922 political matters were somewhat deemphasized in favor of art and culture on Dell's watch, including the first publication of poetry by Claude McKay and the fiction of Michael Gold. When finances became tight that year, the underground Communist Party of America moved to fill the void, working with Eastman, Dell, and the core of writers behind the magazine towards a friendly takeover of the publication effective in October of that same year.

After the fall of 1922, The Liberator emerged as the de facto official organ of the CPA and its "Legal Political Party" sibling, the Workers Party of America — maintaining a similar graphic style and orientation toward fiction, albeit with a noticeable ideological narrowing of political content. Long articles began to be published by prominent Communist leaders, including C. E. Ruthenberg, John Pepper, William Z. Foster, Jay Lovestone, and Max Bedacht. Former anarchist turned Communist true-believer Robert Minor served as editor during this period, assisted by Joseph Freeman as an associate editor in charge of literary material.

In 1924 The Liberator was merged with the Workers Party's Trade Union Educational League magazine, The Labor Herald, and its "Friends of Soviet Russia" monthly, Soviet Russia Pictorial, to form a new publication. This new magazine, The Workers Monthly, was fundamentally similar to the 1923–24 vintage Liberator and continued as the Workers Party's de facto theoretical journal until 1927, at which time it was given a new form and title as The Communist. In January 1945 the name of the publication was changed to Political Affairs. In January 2008, Political Affairs ceased publication as printed paper, switching to an entirely web-based existence. It was later discontinued and aired its final issue in 2016.

== See also ==
- Proletarian literature
- American proletarian poetry movement
