= Frederick Kuh =

American journalist and diplomat (1896–1978)

Frederick Kuh (29 October 1896, Chicago– 2 February 1978) was an American journalist and diplomat who spent most of his career in Europe.

Kuh was born in Chicago and started his career as a reporter for the Chicago Herald and the Chicago Evening Post. In 1919, he travelled in Europe, reporting for The Liberator on the role of British diplomats in the overthrow of the Hungarian Soviet Republic. He was also employed by the London Daily Herald as their Balkan correspondent during this trip. He went on to join United Press becoming their Moscow bureau chief.

Kuh made some significant scoops in international news stories: four days before the official announcement that Italy would surrender to the Allies, he carried the story in the Chicago Sun. He also reported the terms of the Bulgaria's peace treaty 12 hours before any other correspondent. He revealed the refusal of Soviet Government officials to lift the Berlin Blockade two days before it was officially announced by Western governments.
