= Bill Mardo =

American journalist

William Mardo (born Bloom; October 24, 1923 – January 20, 2012) was a writer for The Daily Worker, the Communist Party of America newspaper. He is known for helping fight Major League Baseball's color barrier. He was the last living sportswriter deeply involved in the battle against segregation.

== Early life ==
He was born William Bloom in Manhattan, New York on October 24, 1923, but changed his name when he began his career in journalism.

== Journalism career ==
Mardo joined The Daily Worker in 1942 and remained with them through the early 1950s, when he joined the Soviet news agency Tass.

He died from Parkinson's disease on January 20, 2012, in Manhattan.
