= George Morris (American writer) =

American writer and editor

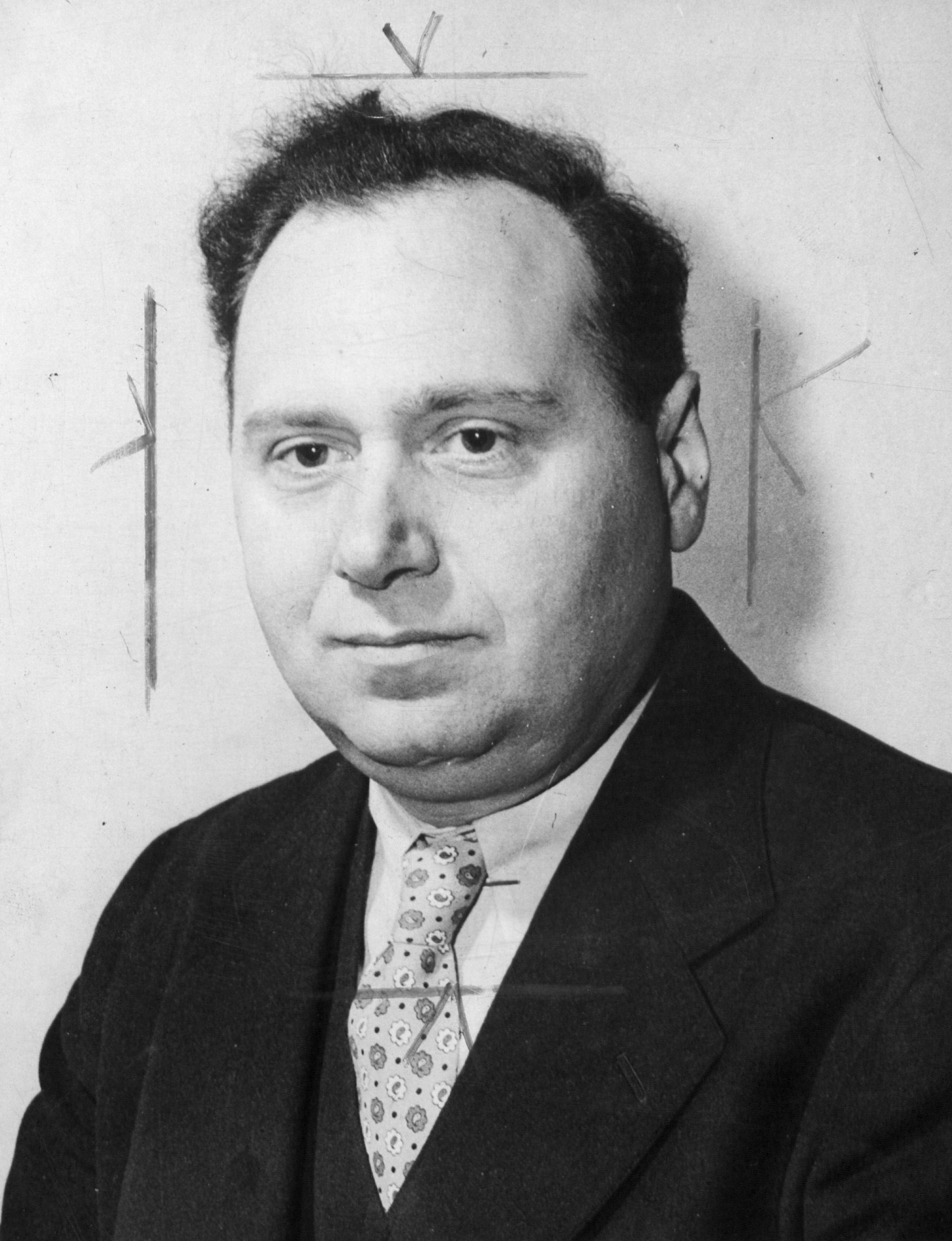
- Morris c. 1946
- Born: Sidney Walter Finkelstein; April 6, 1903; Raehni, Bessarabia Governorate, Russian Empire
- Died: 1997 (aged 93–94)
- Occupations: Pro-labor writer and journalist
- Writing career
- Language: English
- Years active: 1920s-1950s
- Notable works: Daily Worker contributions, A Tale of Two Waterfronts (1952)
- Literary movement: Communism
- Website: scua.library.umass.edu/umarmot/finkelstein-sidney/

George Morris (April 6, 1903 – 1997) was an American writer and labor editor for the CPUSA Daily Worker newspaper who left a body of written work and oral history that documents militant trade unionism as part of American labor history during the first half of the 20th century – including the 1934 West Coast waterfront strike.

== Background ==
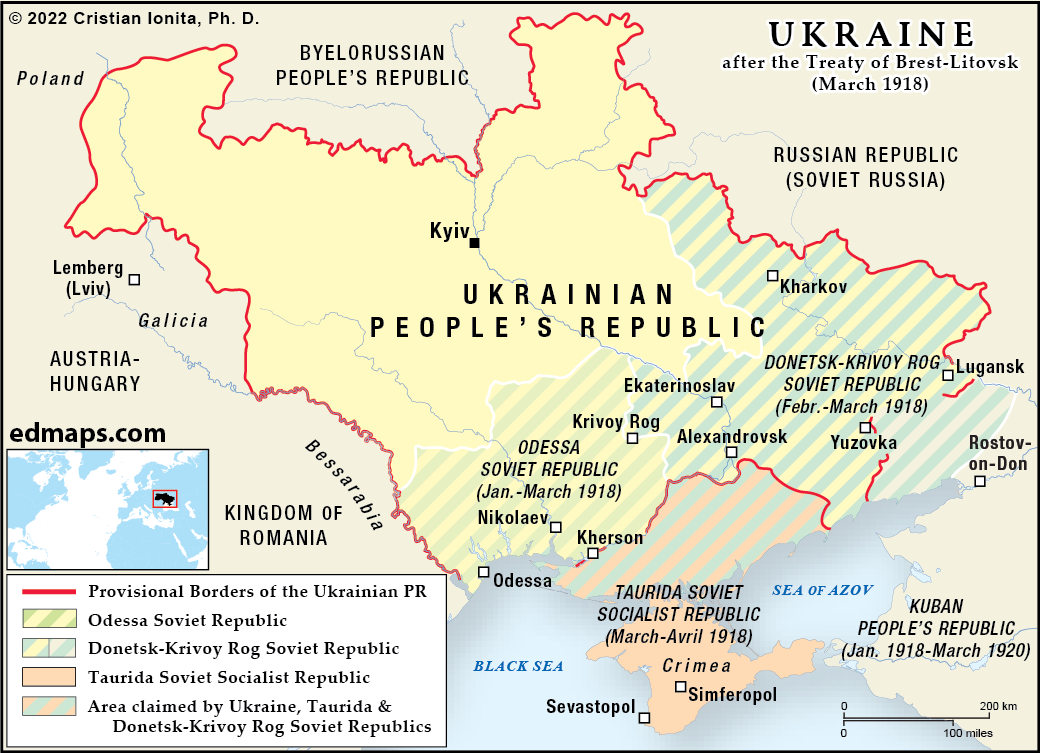
Ukraine in 1918, shortly before Morris left for the United States

George Morris was born "Morris Yusem" on April 6, 1903, to a Jewish family in Raehni (Reni?), Russian Empire (now part of Ukraine). Around 1919, he came to New York City and became a founding member of the Communist Party USA (CPUSA).

== Career ==
For some (currently undocumented) time, Morris headed the CPUSA's Party's National Labor Commission.

According to a confidential FBI source, Morris was a member of the Young Communist League under the Shane "Morris Yusem" from 1927 to 1930.

According to that source via Jack Rubinstein, a vice president of the Textile Workers Union CIO, Morris (as Yusem) also went to Moscow in 1928 to attend the International Lenin School. On February 24, 1928, Morris Yusem, garment worker, received a US passport to travel in Western Europe; on May 11, 1929, he received another passport to travel to Russia.

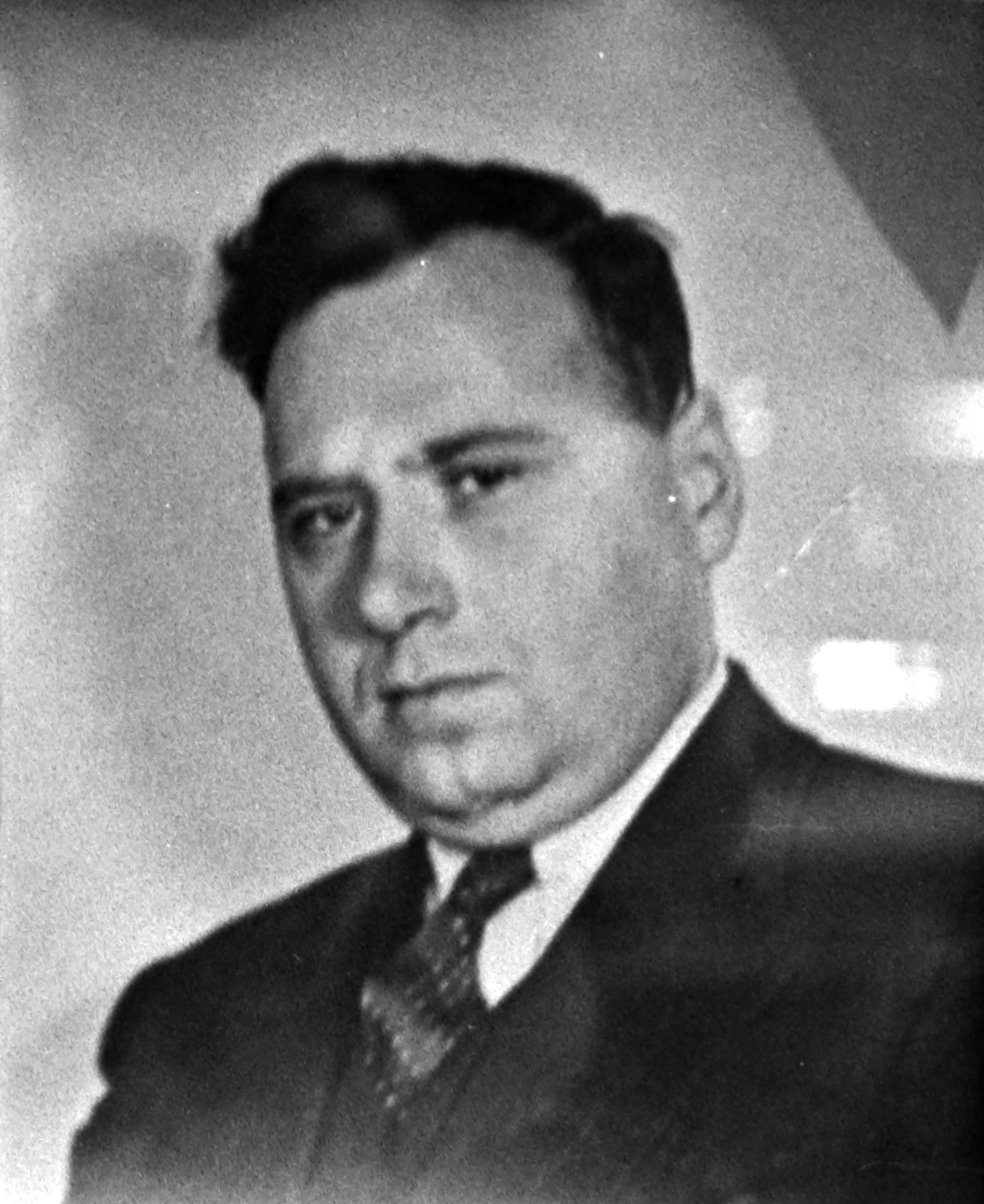
Morris c. 1938

Morris edited the Western Worker to 1932 to 1934 and successor titles. In 1934, he became labor editor for the Daily Worker and the Worker and covered the rise of the United Auto Workers of America (UAW) closely from 1935 to 1937.

In 1944, Morris joined the Communist Party paper the Daily Worker as its labor editor and writer of the column "World of Labor," often about the Congress of Industrial Organizations (CIO). In 1947 (and possibly longer), he also wrote a column called "View on Labor News." During 1946–1948, Morris also contributed articles to Political Affairs (formerly The Communist theoretical journal).

During 1947–1948, Morris spoke frequently in public, according to an FBI informant in 1949. On March 23, 1947, he spoke to the Mosholu-Kingsbridge section of the communist party. In June 1947, he spoke on "Your Stake in Labor's Battle With the Trusts" at the Progressive Forum, 13 Astor Place, New York City. On September 5, 1947, Morris spoke to Lodge 102 of the International Workers Order (IWO) on the Taft–Hartley Act. On September 6, 1947, the Daily Worker announced that Morris would cover the CIO's New York State convention at Saratoga Springs and then visit Schenectady, Buffalo, Detroit, Flint, Toledo, Cleveland, Youngstown, Pittsburgh, and Boston to see the conditions of industrial workers. On June 28, 1948, Morris spoke to a Brooklyn communist party convention. On September 19, 1948, Morris spoke on "Who's Splitting the Labor Movement" to the Jefferson School of Social Sciences in New York City. On December 9, 1948, Morris spoke to a Brooklyn press conference.

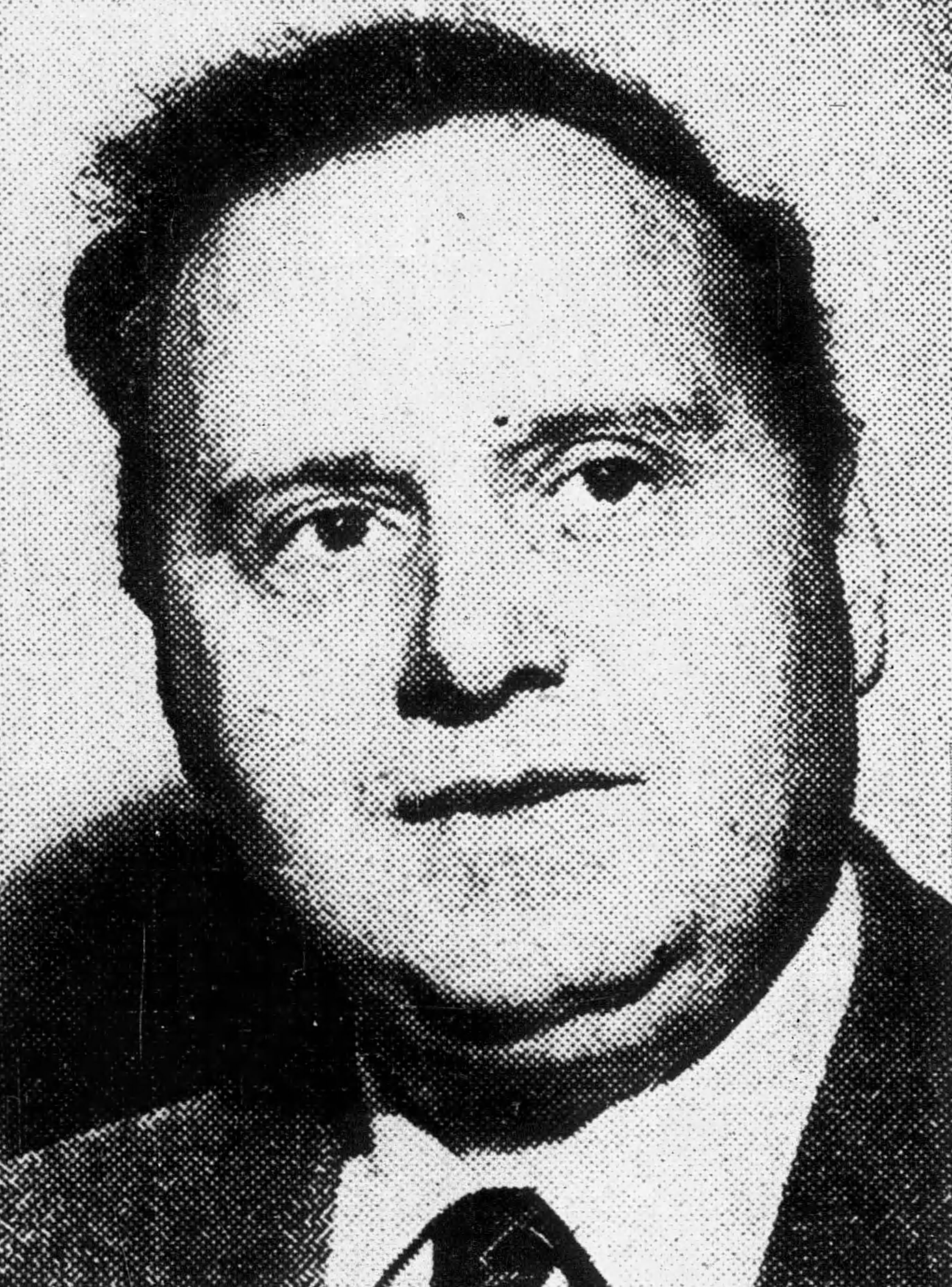
Morris c. 1950

In January 1948, the Marxist monthly Spark quoted Morris from a January 4, 1948, article in the Daily Worker:

"The trouble with many of our labor leaders especially in the CIO is that they have not yet made up their minds that FDR is dead. For a decade or more many of them have learned to rely on White House Nursing bottles (when such was forthcoming) than upon the fighting strength of their members. ... But they are making the big mistake that they made in the 1946 elections which brought us the Taft-Hartley and Marshall Plan Congress. They then tried to mobilize votes for candidates who hardly differed from GOP reactionaries. Millions of workers refused to turn out to vote.

In 1959, the US Congress questioned Harry Bridges about Morris.

In 1959 and 1966, Morris took "extended trips" to the USSR to study Soviet trade unions.

In late 1963, the FBI noted that Morris wrote in The Worker about "the 'enigma' of Oswald," which needed clearing as to whether the FBI, CIA, State Department, or Dallas police department had set Oswald up as an "undercover plant" in the assassination of US President John F. Kennedy.

In October 1964, an explosive device arrived by mail to the offices of The Worker, addressed to Morris; a police bomb squad dismantled it. It was the second such bomb in a week, and members of the police in both Chicago and New York, as well as the US Post Office Department and the Federal Bureau of Investigation investigated the attempted bombings.

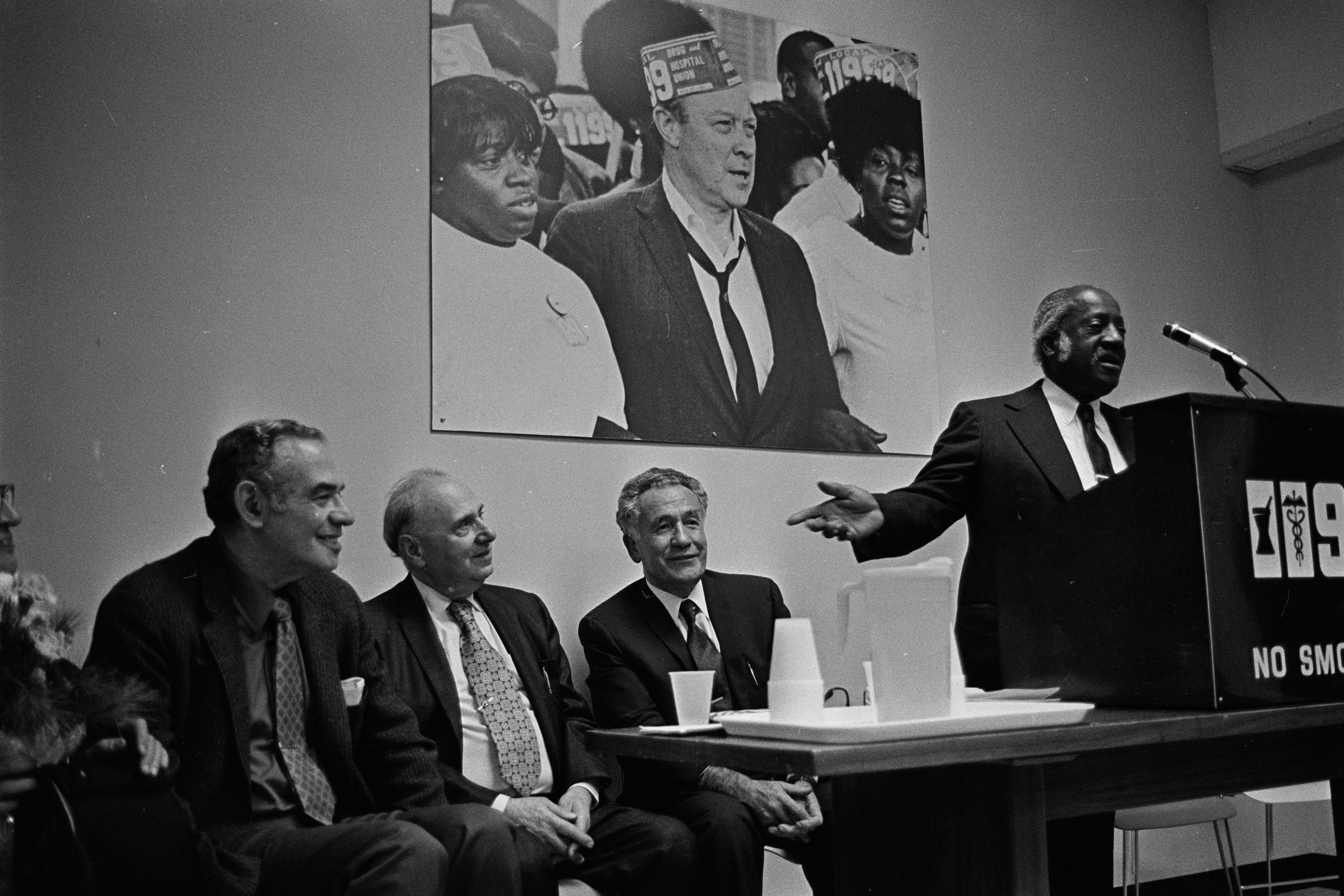
Sol Bryson speaks at Morris's sendoff reception, November 15, 1971. (L-R): Si Gerson, George Morris, Louis Weinstock, Sol Bryson.

Morris' 1971 article on the police received mention in 2015 Workers World newspaper, republished in 2020 in Struggle for Socialism newspaper:

A column by George Morris, the Daily World's labor analyst, waxes eloquent about the cops' strike and says "it is in the spirit of rebellion we see everywhere today as in unions against the long entrenched bureaucracy." He further says that the cops are "beginning to see themselves as in much the same position as other city employees and workers." Finally, he admonishes his readers that "fire should not be blunderbussed against all on the police force."
You see, the way to look at it is that there are good cops and bad cops, just like there are good capitalists and bad ones. We must assume then, that there are good storm troopers and bad ones if we use the logic of George Morris. In this way, Morris substitutes bourgeois morality for Marxist analysis of class antagonisms and contradictions between class groupings.

== Legacy ==
In addition to his written works, Morris gave an Oral history in 1980, whose topics include:

- 1934 West Coast waterfront strike
- International Longshoremen's Association and its president Joe Ryan
- Rank and File issues
- Impact on jobs due to the growing use of containerization in shipping
- Laborers' International Union of North America and Angelo Fosco
- International Longshore and Warehouse Union (ILWU) and Harry Bridges
- Marine Workers Industrial Union, Industrial Workers of the World (IWW), and Joe Kearny
- Congress of Industrial Organizations (CIO) and John L. Lewis
- AFL–CIO
- Communist Party USA
- Cold War

== Works ==
Morris wrote pamphlets and articles, often for New Century Publishers. His most famous article was the 1953 "Tale of Two Waterfronts."

Morris wrote some 40 pamphlets and books, including:

- Reconversion: The Trotskyite Fifth Column in the Labor Movement (1945)
- How Wall Street Picks Your Pocket (1946)
- The Red-Baiting Racket (1947)
- How to Make Your Vote Count (1948)
- Where is the CIO Going? (1949)
- The CIO Today (1950)
- A Tale of Two Waterfronts (1952)
- Labor and Anti-Semitism (1953)
- What I Saw... in the Soviet Union Today (1959)
- American Labor: Which Way? (1961)
- CIA And American Labor: The Subversion Of The AFL-CIO's Foreign Policy (1967)

== See also ==
- 1934 West Coast waterfront strike
- Harry Bridges
- Communist Party USA
- Daily Worker
