= David Karr =

American journalist, businessman, Communist and NKVD agent

David Harold Karr, born David Katz (1918, Brooklyn, New York – 7 July 1979, Paris) was an American journalist, businessman, Communist and NKVD source.

== Early life ==
David Karr was born David Katz in 1918 in Brooklyn, New York, into a Jewish family.

He developed an early interest in journalism and became involved with left-wing politics while young. Karr later wrote for the Daily Worker, the newspaper of the Communist Party USA.

== Espionage allegations ==
In 1943, Karr came under the scrutiny of Representative Martin Dies Jr., chairman of the House Special Committee on Un-American Activities, for his communist affiliations. Karr was at the time working for the Office of War Information (OWI). Karr appeared before the committee and stated under oath that he was an informant for the FBI, but that testimony was later challenged. A congressional investigation found no cause to remove him, while the Civil Service Commission concluded that he was untruthful and unreliable. Karr resigned from the OWI and was subsequently hired by Drew Pearson.

With the release of the Venona decrypts, a June 1944 communication indicated that Karr was an informational source for the NKVD. Soviet agent Vladimir Pravdin reported to Moscow information that he said had been received from TASS deputy bureau chief Samuel Krafsur through Karr.

Karr earned a reputation as an aggressive investigative reporter who sometimes misrepresented himself to sources. In 1944, Karr was also active in Vice President Henry Wallace's effort to remain on the presidential ticket. President Franklin Roosevelt referred to Karr as a "chronic liar." During the war, Karr was investigated twice by the FBI, including after obtaining a secret report on Soviet leader Joseph Stalin prepared for Roosevelt by Oskar Lange. To obtain the report, Karr claimed to be on the staff of Vice President Wallace.

On 12 September 1946, Pearson wrote an article based on a classified U.S. military study of British operations against the Greek Communist insurgency. The article contained classified information concerning the British order of battle in Greece. An investigation determined that the original document was missing and that information had reached Pearson through Karr.

The FBI had Phillip Jaffe under audio surveillance during the Amerasia investigation and recorded discussions concerning possible contacts for obtaining information from government sources. In 1950, Senator Joseph McCarthy publicly accused Karr of acting as Pearson's Soviet intelligence contact.

Karr later wrote a series of articles about the use of public relations in corporate takeovers. In 1959, he became CEO of the Fairbanks-Whitney Corporation, a defense contractor whose divisions included Colt Firearms. He was dismissed by shareholders three years later.

Karr subsequently became involved in film, hotel and international business ventures. In 1971, he became associated with Armand Hammer, whose Soviet contacts expanded Karr's business opportunities. Karr developed a relationship with Dzherman Gvishiani, the son-in-law of Soviet Premier Alexei Kosygin. He was granted North and South American trademark rights to Misha the Bear, the mascot of the 1980 Olympic Games, and joined Hammer in a venture involving Olympic commemorative coins.

Karr frequently claimed to have close relationships with prominent U.S. senators and presidential candidates and to have transmitted information between Soviet and American officials concerning détente, trade and arms negotiations. By the 1970s he was living in Paris and headed a Franco-American firm called Finatec. According to later KGB archival material, Karr arranged contacts between Senator Edward Kennedy and Soviet officials.

In 1992, Yevgenia Albats, a Russian journalist who had examined Soviet archives following the Soviet coup attempt of 1991, published material from a classified KGB memorandum.

In 1978, American Senator Edward Kennedy appealed to the KGB to assist in establishing cooperation between Soviet organizations and the California firm Agritech, headed by former Senator J. Tunney. This firm in turn was connected to a French-American company, Finatec S.A., which was run by a competent KGB source, the prominent Western financier D. Karr, through whom opinions had been confidentially exchanged for several years between the General Secretary of the Communist Party and Sen. Kennedy. D. Karr provided the KGB with technical information on conditions in the U.S. and other capitalist countries which were regularly reported to the Central Committee.

In late 1978, during Occidental Petroleum's attempted takeover of the Mead Corporation, Karr gave testimony before the Securities and Exchange Commission. He alleged that, during a 1972 visit to Moscow, Hammer had been confronted by KGB officers regarding bribery and the possession of letters written by Vladimir Lenin.

== Death ==
Karr died suddenly in Paris on 7 July 1979, shortly after returning from a trip to Moscow. His death was generally attributed to a heart attack, although his fourth wife questioned whether it had been natural and obtained a court order delaying his burial.

Karr's connections to intelligence, politics and international business contributed to continued speculation surrounding his death. His widow suggested several possible explanations involving intelligence agencies or organized crime, but no conclusive evidence of foul play was established.

After the collapse of the Soviet Union, Albats cited KGB archival records describing Karr as a source who supplied information about conditions and technical capabilities in the United States and other Western countries.

== Legacy ==
In 2009, Karr's grandson, filmmaker Doug Karr, made the short film Ten for Grandpa, which examined David Karr's life and the controversies surrounding him.

The film premiered at the 2009 Sundance Film Festival, where it was shown in the International Shorts Competition.
