= John L. Spivak =

American journalist (1897–1981)

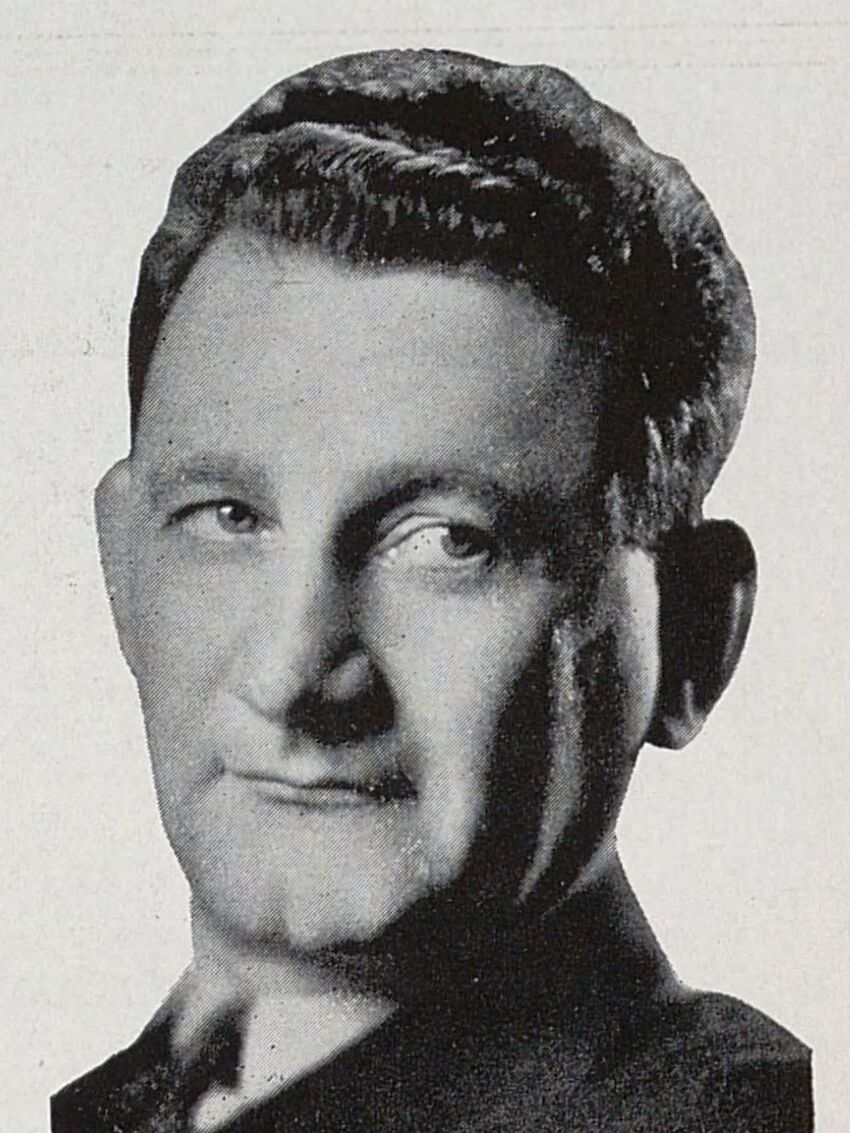
Spivak c. 1939

John Louis Spivak (June 13, 1897 – September 30, 1981) was an American socialist and later communist reporter and author, who wrote about the problems of the working class, racism, and the spread of fascism in Europe and the United States. Most of his writings date from the 1920s and 1930s. In response to the Second Red Scare, he lived under a pseudonym for much of the 1950s and '60s, emerging again to publish his autobiography in 1967 and to resume his journalism career in the 1970s.

== Early life and overview ==
As a boy Spivak worked in a number of industrial factories in his hometown of New Haven, Connecticut.

He was attracted to leftist ideas in his teenage years and later wrote that writing was "more to me than just a trade I liked; it was a weapon." He claimed he never joined the Communist Party. In his 1967 autobiography, he described how the 1939 Molotov–Ribbentrop Pact temporarily shook his faith in the Soviet Union as the guardian of radical ideals until he decided that the Soviet Union's survival justified it.

Along with many of his contemporaries, Spivak experimented with new forms of reporting in which the reporter appeared in his stories as an investigator and witness, drawing the reader into his experience. He used the "exposé quotation" technique to underscore differences between his subject's words and actions and presented himself as a confrontational interviewer. He dramatized his own research efforts and search for facts for the benefit of the reader. He also was up front and open in making clear his political world view so as to disarm the reader's objections to his lack of objectivity. One of the foremost students of 1930s American journalism recognized his achievement: "A large share of the period's exposés were his."

Spivak cooperated with the NKVD, predecessors of the Soviet KGB, in the 1930s, perhaps from as early as 1932. NKVD reports indicated that the Soviets particularly valued information he obtained from sources at U.S. Congressional committees, and the NKVD described Spivak as an "agent" in intercepted cables. He obtained material that included details about the German government's financing and sponsorship of Nazi activity in the U.S. as well as documents related to munitions and chemical weapons research. The KGB also used Spivak as a source of information about [Trotskyists], its ideological enemies on the left. The KGB appears to have changed its mind about his usefulness more than once, so Spivak's relationship to the KGB was intermittent for more than a decade.

== Career ==
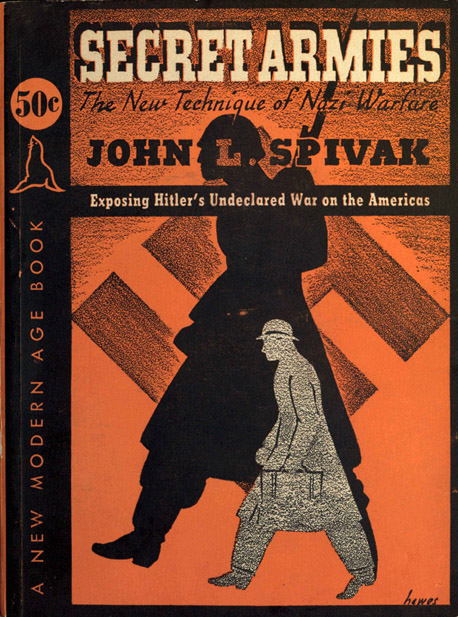
Cover of Secret Armies (1939) by John L. Spivak

Spivak landed his first job as a police reporter for the New Haven Union. He moved to New York where he worked at the Morning Sun, Evening Graphic, and The Call, the paper of the American Socialist Party. His first major story came when he covered the Battle of Matewan in West Virginia. He then served briefly as a reporter and bureau chief in Berlin and Moscow for the International News Service. Upon his return to the United States, he became a feature writer for leftist newspapers and magazines such as the Communist Party USA's Daily Worker, Ken, and the New Masses.

In 1930, in a case known as the "Whalen Papers," Spivak used his position as a journalist on behalf of the Soviet Union. When documents detailing Soviet propaganada efforts came into the possession of the New York City Police Department, Spivak quickly demonstrated they were forgeries. Only years later did it transpire that the documents were supplied by the Soviets so that Spivak, alert to the scheme, could discredit them and thereby undermine Congressional efforts to investigate Communist propaganda in the United States.

Spivak traveled throughout the South in the early 1930s interviewing prison camp officials and photographing camp practices and punishment records. His novel, Georgia Nigger (later retitled, Hard Times on a Southern Chain Gang,) depicting the brutality of peonage labor and chain gangs, was serialized in several newspapers, including the Daily Worker and the Des Moines Tribune. Soon after it appeared in 1932, an academic study called it "a second Uncle Tom's Cabin, an indictment of peonage and convict-labor in Georgia, powerful enough to put to shame all the rhapsodists of the folk Negro's happy state." Another reviewer thought it posed "a moral challenge" but disliked its exaggerations and the author's "superciliousness." The book carried an appendix with photographs and documents designed to document the novel's descriptions of torture. "Thus his novel," wrote one reviewer, "in addition to the dramatic force of an interesting and well-told story, has the weight and authority of a sociological investigation." Just a few weeks after the book appeared, Spivak testified with other experts on the Georgia penal system in a successful attempt to persuade New Jersey Governor A. Harry Moore to refuse to extradite a fugitive from a Georgia chain gang.

In 1934, some of Spivak's New Masses articles on anti-Semitism in the U.S. were reprinted as a 93-page pamphlet called Plotting America's Pogroms.

His 1935 exposé in the Communist Party's New Masses charged a congressional committee with deliberately suppressing evidence of an offer made to retired Marine General Smedley D. Butler by Wall Street financiers (the Business Plot) to lead a military coup against the U.S. government and replace it with a fascist regime. Butler was supposedly, "offered $3,000,000 to organize a fascist army with a promise of $300,000,000 more if it became necessary." Spivak wrote, "The anti-semitic character of Nazism has been abundantly demonstrated in these pages; nevertheless this article, and succeeding ones, will reveal Jewish financiers working with fascist groups which, if successful, would unquestionably heighten the wave of Hate-the-Jew propaganda." He referred specifically to Felix Warburg, the McCormack–Dickstein Committee, and certain members of the American Jewish Committee in collusion with J. P. Morgan. Hans Schmidt concludes that while Spivak made a cogent argument for taking the suppressed testimony seriously, he embellished his article with his "overblown" claims regarding Jewish financiers, which Schmidt dismisses as guilt by association not supported by the evidence of the Butler-MacGuire conversations themselves.

Most of Spivak's work was dedicated to supporting communism, exposing capitalism, fascism and underground Nazi spy groups in Central America, Europe, and the U.S. In March 1935, the last issue of the American Spectator gave its award for "best reporting" to Spivak for his articles in New Masses on Nazi and anti-Semitic activity in the U.S.

Spivak announced the thesis of America Faces the Barricades (1935) in the preface: "I think that the capitalist system in this country still has some distance to go before it falls....We are in for a period of great unrest, organized and unorganized revolts and bloodshed; a period, I think, which will continue until the present economic system has been completely changed." Time provided its readers with a brief description of : "Misleadingly titled collection of sober reports on conditions and states of mind among the unemployed, California migratory workers, Southern sharecroppers and other distressed groups, written by one of the ablest of U.S. radical journalists." Another review said Spivak "used to be a first-class reporter," and while granting that "One does not doubt Mr. Spivak's facts," said that "It is the pattern that seems overdrawn." A more appreciative reviewer found Spivak "natively fair-minded and realistic," but doubted his conclusions, especially his assessment of the threat of domestic Nazism and anti-Semitism: "[He] seems to take fools too seriously. Mr. Spivak is in danger of being as credulous of the claims of counter-revolution as some of our eminent citizens are of the claims of revolution."

Spivak toured parts of Europe and produced a portrait of the continent in Europe under the Terror (1936). Time found it interesting enough to summarize at length, country by country: "Italy's tyrants, suggests Spivak, are clowns, its people poltroons."; "Germany's tyrants Spivak describes as super-efficient grafting gangsters, its people dolts."; "Poland's tyrants, according to Spivak, are amiable, intelligent playboys, its people hopeless serfs." In sum:

Europe Under the Terror, like the peasants' potatoes, must be taken with a little salt. Readers will be considerably baffled to know how this U.S. investigator, who speaks only English and German, managed to evoke such dangerous confidences from the most illiterate classes in Italy, Poland and Czechoslovakia through interpreters. Author Spivak is a shade too ready to forecast the collapse of tyrannies, to overestimate the potency of the rebellious spirit. His book is valuable as a document of a kind that rarely emerges from the censored murk of dictatorship.

British diplomat turned academic E.H. Carr found it "ambitious" and partly interesting, and wished Spivak had covered some harder to study regions. Columbia University Soviet specialist Michael T. Florinsky dissected Spivak's reporting. He noted that Spivak's style appealed to both the New Masses and William Randolph Hearst's New York Journal because his work lacked the attributes of "high-class journalism": "objectivity, accuracy, comprehensiveness, and a sense of proportion." He found nothing new about the rulers except "fantastic stories about the German and Italian spy system," yet was moved by Spivak's "real feeling for the underdog." He cited statements "in flagrant contradiction with easily ascertainable facts," a complete misunderstanding of German agricultural policy, and a tale of Nazi officials trying to smuggle German marks abroad that would not be convertible into any other currency. He summarized:

These and other gross distortions of facts are particularly regrettable because they make it difficult to accept on its face value Mr. Spivak's evidence on the development of the revolutionary movement in the countries he visited, evidence that cannot be checked from their sources. It was obtained by him in Germany, Poland and Austria under conditions so romantic and melodramatic that they put Hollywood completely to shame. According to Mr. Spivak, the leaders of secret anti-Fascist organizations sought to meet him, although not only their personal freedom and perhaps even their lives, but also, to a certain extent, the success of the movement itself, were at stake. With all respect for Mr. Spivak's abilities, the risks taken by these German, Polish and Austrian revolutionaries seems to be utterly unreasonable and the destinies of the anti-Fascist movement put in rather reckless hands. One should not, however, overestimate their Fascist opponents. Under the fire of the fairly innocuous and sometimes rather naive questions of the impetuous and fearless American journalist, the high Fascist officials in Rome turned white, green, gray and red, and then finally collapsed in utter confusion and helplessness. No wonder Mr. Spivak foresees momentous changes in the near future.

Another New York Times reviewer described it as "a clever attempt to pick out the threads of fear, misery and venality in the texture of Central Europe today, not with a scholar's fine point but with the blunt stub of a partisan." "Mr. Spivak is an artist in black and white and can't be bothered with intermediary shades of color....If, in your opinion, striking contrasts and brilliant writing can compensate for oversimplification and ingenuousness, Mr. Spivak is the man for your money."

Under the sponsorship of New Masses, Spivak toured the United States in 1936 delivering a lecture on the dangers of fascism called "I Saw."

In October 1937, Spivak testified before a Massachusetts legislative commission investigating Communist, fascist, and Nazi activities, describing a nationwide Nazi propaganda network and accusing two employees of Henry Ford, among others, of distributing Nazi propaganda. He identified another witness as a distributor of Nazi propaganda, who in turn said Spivak was being paid by the Communist Party.

In a sort of sequel to Secret Armies, Honorable Spy (1939) described smuggling and war preparations on the part of West Coast Japanese in collusion with Nazis, hiding weapons in Mexico, and spying on American defense installations with telescopic lenses. One review followed a summation of its charges with an evaluation: "How much of what Mr. Spivak sees and hears is true, we do not know. But we trust that Mr. Hoover's F.B.I. officials. as well as the Mexican government, will look sharply into these activities."

In 1940, he was arrested for criminal libel because of charges he made in Secret Armies that Edward F. Sullivan, an investigator for the House Un-American Activities Committee, and Kurt Sepmeier, a German instructor at Wichita State University, were Nazi agents.

Spivak also investigated the financial activities of Charles E. Coughlin, the Catholic radio priest who founded the National Shrine of the Little Flower in Royal Oak, Michigan. One author described Spivak's combination of documentation and advocacy in Shrine of the Silver Dollar (1940) as "in the nature of investigative reporting." A review of the historical literature on Coughlin places a sympathetic biography at one end of the scale and Spivak's "rabid" study at the other, calling Shrine "a primary document of the brown scare," that is, an unwarranted and hysterical fear of a right-wing overthrow of the federal government.

== Later years ==
New Century, a Communist publishing house, issued two pamphlets of Spivak's work that attacked America's political right wing for its role in creating the Cold War: Pattern for Domestic Fascism (1947) and The "Save the Country" Racket (1948).

With the rise of McCarthyism, Spivak spent much of the 1950s and 1960s writing under several pen names for men's magazines including Cavalier, Esquire, Fury, Male, and Man to Man. He lived for 2 decades under the pseudonym Monroe Fry. Esquire published a collection of his short fiction, "lurid stories about easy women, prostitutes, and other 'favors' routinely enjoyed by the middle-class dad on a sales trip," as Sex, Vice and Business by Monroe Fry. One review described its treatment of the subject as "slightly sensationalized."

He and his wife, Mabel, retired to their farm in Easton, Pennsylvania. Assuming the name John L. Spivak once more, in 1967 he published his autobiography, A Man in His Time, which covered his life up to 1939. Reviewing it for the New York Times, veteran liberal journalist Gerald W. Johnson wrote that Spivak's style of journalism, committed to "the exposure of villains" and "dramatic intensity," produces in the end "a distinct aura of mythology." Citing Spivak's account of the Liberty League's conspiracy to depose Roosevelt, Johnson acknowledged a certain basis in reality but called Spivak's account "pretty farfetched." Johnson praised Spivak's enduring optimism and skills as a writer: "As a pictorial writer, he is deft, evoking with a line or two a picture that a less competent hand would take a page to limn." He described the work's content, however, as "a series of impressions of an observer, highly skillful, but highly unscientific....It needs to be balanced and corrected by the work of historians trained in a more rigorous professional discipline."

From 1968 to 1973 he wrote a consumer affairs column called "Action! Express" for the Easton Express, a newspaper based in Easton, Pennsylvania. His work led to a federal investigation of sales tactics used by magazine circulation companies.

Spivak died in Philadelphia in 1981, six months after his wife died. They had been married for 64 years and were survived by a daughter and grandson.

Most of Spivak's papers are held at Syracuse University, while some related to Georgia Nigger are at the University of Texas at Austin.

== Assessments ==
Some time before 1937, muckraker Lincoln Steffens described Spivak as "the best of us."

== Partial bibliography ==
- The Medical Trust Unmasked (New York: S. Siegfried, 1929)
- Devil's Brigade (New York: Brewer and Warren, Inc., 1930)
- Georgia Nigger (New York: Brewer, Warren & Putnam, 1932)
- Plotting America's Pogroms: A Documental Exposé of Organized Anti-Semitism in the United States (New York: New Masses, 1934)
- Ṿer greyṭ pogromen af Idn in Ameriḳe? (Plotting America's Pogroms, translated into Yiddish) (Amherst, MA: National Yiddish Book Center, (n.d.) 1934)
- The Rise and Fall of a Tabloid. In Reader's Digest, Vol. 25, No. 149. September 1934
- America Faces the Barricades (New York: Covici Friede Inc., 1935), available online
- Europe Under the Terror (New York: Simon & Schuster, 1936)
- Hitler's Racketeers. In Reader's Digest, Vol. 28, No. 167. March 1936
- Secret Armies: The New Technique of Nazi Warfare (New York: Modern Age Books, 1939), available online
- Honorable Spy: Exposing Japanese Military Intrigue in the United States (New York: Modern Age Books, 1939), available online
- Shrine of the Silver Dollar: A Documented Story of Father Coughlin (New York: Modern Age Books, 1940), available online
- England's Cliveden Set. In Conspiracy Digest: Evidence - Theory - Speculation, Vol. V, Num. 4. Fall 1980 (Originally written circa 1940)
- Pattern for Domestic Fascism (New York: New Century, 1947)
- The "Save the Country" Racket (New York: New Century, 1948)
- Спасители Америки ("Saviors of America" - The "Save the Country" Racket, translated into Russian) (Moscow: Foreign Literature Publishing House, 1949)
- Sex, Vice and Business (writing as Monroe Fry) (New York: Ballantine Books, 1959)
- A Man In His Time (New York: Horizon Press, 1967)
