= Alternative Press Index (index) =

American bibliographic database

- Categories: Subject Index, Political Science, Social Sciences, Leftist, Radical
- Frequency: Switched from quarterly to biannually in volume 38
- Format: Print
- Publisher: Alternative Press Center, Inc
- Founded: 1969
- Country: USA
- Based in: Maryland
- Website: https://www.altpress.org/

The Alternative Press Index (API) is an American bibliographic database that indexes politically progressive publications. Founded in 1969, the journal is committed to providing a comprehensive guide to alternative, leftist, and radical newspapers and magazines. They focus on topics such as feminism, socialism, anarchism, liberation movements, Indigenous peoples, Black Movement, and labor.

API indexes articles of 5 or more paragraphs. The database notably covers international and interdisciplinary materials going back as far as 20 years. It has also been said that 90% of publications indexed by API are not indexed anywhere else.

Alternative Press Index has provided access to works by notable figures such as bell hooks, Angela Davis, and Judith Butler.

The Alternative Press Center produces the Alternative Press Index.
