= Lester Rodney =

American journalist (1911–2009)

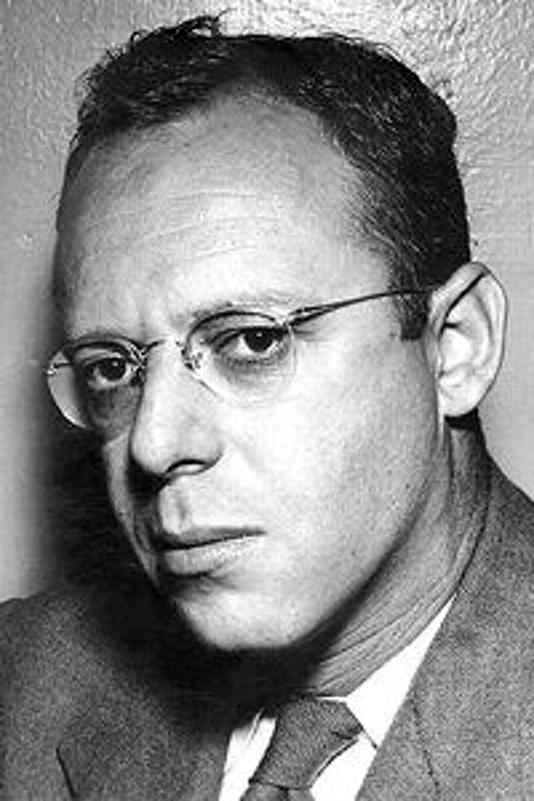
- Rodney c. 1947
- Born: April 17, 1911; New York City, U.S.
- Died: December 20, 2009 (aged 98); Walnut Creek, California, U.S.
- Occupation: Journalist
- Notable credit: Daily Worker

Lester Rodney (April 17, 1911 – December 20, 2009) was an American journalist who helped break down the color barrier in baseball as sports writer for the Daily Worker.

== Early life ==
Rodney was born in Manhattan, New York City on April 17, 1911, the third of four children of Isabel Cotton and Max Rodney. The Rodneys moved from the Bronx to Brooklyn when Lester was 6, where his lifelong love of the Dodgers developed. Rodney’s father lost his business, and then the family home, in the 1929 stock market crash that began the Great Depression, an era in which communism and other radical social philosophies captured the attention of the intelligentsia. Rodney earned a partial track scholarship to Syracuse University, but his family could not afford the other half of his tuition so he did not complete his formal education. To supplement the family income, he took odd jobs, including helping his attorney brother-in-law and chauffeuring rich children to school.

== Sports writer for the Daily Worker ==
In 1936, 25-year-old Rodney parlayed a background in high-school sportswriting into a job with the Daily Worker and its Sunday edition, the Sunday Worker, the party organ of the Communist Party USA, or CPUSA. Rodney's style was to combine sports journalism with a sense of social justice, to champion social issues through sports. Most notably Rodney and his staff sought to highlight a topic of particular interest to the ComIntern: the desegregation of major league baseball. Many American Jews felt as persecuted as African Americans during this era, and saw the contradiction of the fight against Hitler's bigotry and the continued oppression of black people in the United States.

Rodney was given wide discretion in his sportswriting, permitted to criticize baseball, America, and Hitler in order to prove the fact that African American ballplayers were the equals of white major leaguers. Before Rodney took the helm of the Sports section of the Daily Worker, its sports column was basically used for Communist propaganda purposes only, such as telling workers that sports were being used by the American media as a means to turn their attention away from the more important topics in their lives, such as class struggle.

However, after Rodney wrote a letter to the editor of the paper, Clarence Hathaway, explaining that he believed the sports column needed to write about why U.S workers found sports meaningful to their cause, he was amazed when he was offered the job as editor of the sports page, not knowing that the ComIntern had recently decided that a focus on the social and cultural issues in American sports could help garner support to the burgeoning Communist movement in the United States.

He started to write about sports in a way that was not seen in other newspapers at the time, focusing more on the importance of their social impact than on box scores. He did investigative reporting on the relationship of race, culture, and sports. He highlighted the careers of good Negro League baseball players, bragging up their background and history. He was a key factor in the start of the Worker's campaign to integrate baseball in the 1930s. In an interview in Dave Zirin's book What's My Name, Fool? Rodney says after he started reporting on Negro players, he realized the "huge void that no one is talking about. This is America, land of the free, and people with the wrong pigmentation of skin can't play baseball?"

Rodney was always looking for more evidence that baseball should be interracial, including by surveying white players who were open to integration. Those who stated an opinion said they would stand by it, contradicting what the owners of the baseball teams believed, or at least stated to the press. Rodney and his staff leveled much of their criticism at Branch Rickey, who just happened to be the general manager of the local Brooklyn Dodgers, Rodney's favorite team.

He served in the South Pacific in World War II, and it was during his service that Branch Rickey announced the signing of Los Angeles native and war veteran Jackie Robinson to a minor league contract. Throughout much of the United States, World War II had a positive effect on the cause for integrating major league baseball because black men had been good enough to fight and die for the U.S., yet were not able play in the major leagues. In 1939, the Daily Worker was the first to scout Robinson as major-league-level talent, and had touted his abilities long before this event. Daily Worker editor Mike Gold wrote an editorial praising Rodney’s efforts at bringing desegregation to fruition. Rodney was one of the few white sportswriters of his time to devote a great deal of space and praise to black athletes. One of his closest friends was Satchel Paige, who he covered a lot on his page because he was one of the best pitchers ever at the time, but did not get the career and recognition that he deserved because he was in the Negro League. His sports page often carried more stories about Joe Louis and Kenny Washington than on those white athletes whose prowess was the subject of the mainstream papers. Rodney's outspoken commentary often publicly pitted him against other sportswriters, but they would often offer information for Rodney to publish what they could not themselves use. Soon after returning from the war, Rodney met the woman who would become his second wife, Clare, a lifelong educator, and they were married on April 21, 1946. Rodney stayed with the Daily Worker until the mid-1950s, keeping on top of racial issues in sports.

== Fresh start in California ==
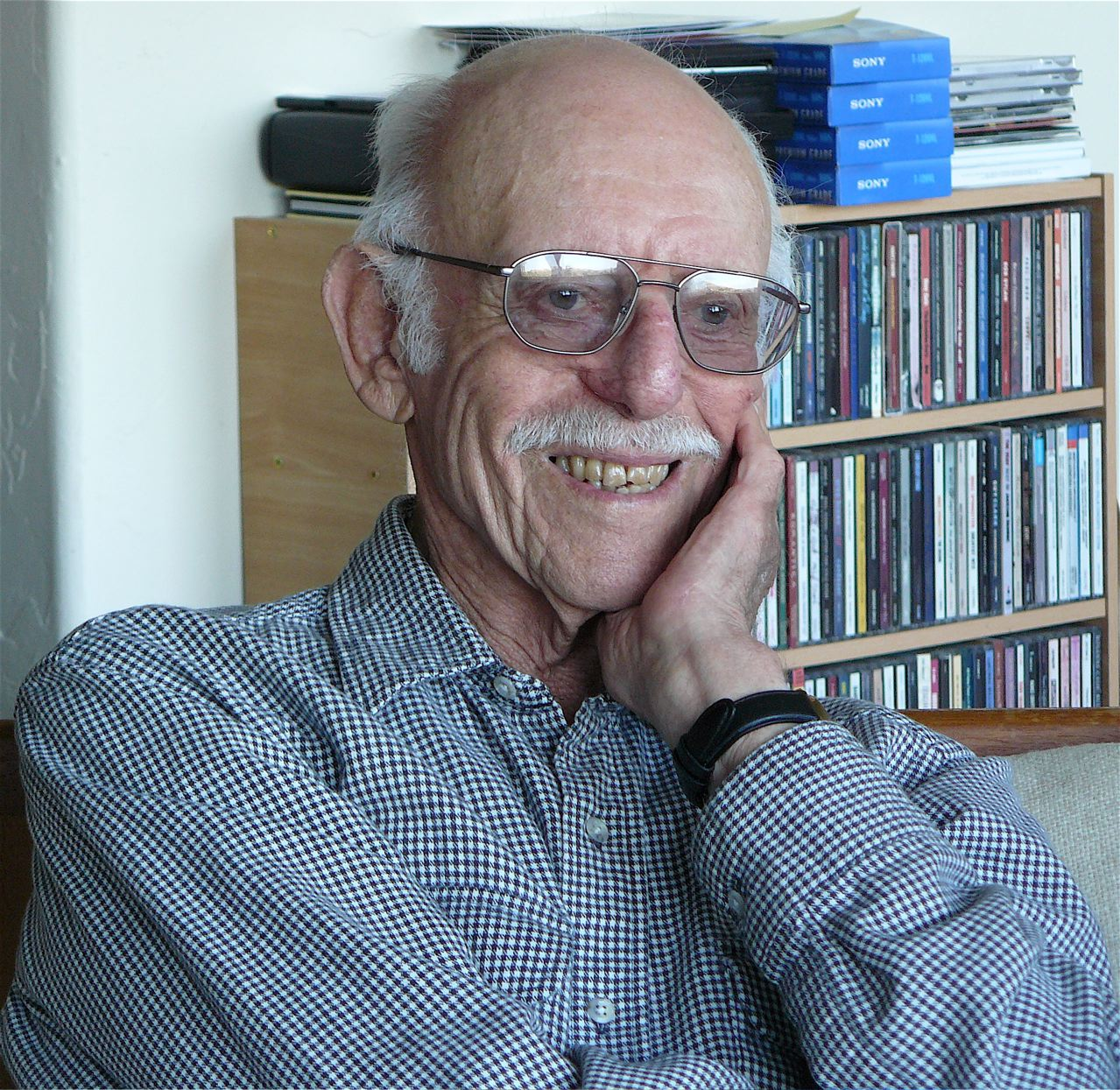
Lester Rodney, September 2007, photograph by Byron LaGoy

Following Nikita Khrushchev's 1956 Secret Speech detailing the crimes of the Joseph Stalin era, Rodney joined Daily Worker editor John Gates in an attempt to open the pages of the paper to debate. CPUSA leaders suppressed this staff revolt, and suspended publication of the paper as a daily. After 22 years as the Daily Worker's sports writer, Rodney resigned from the CPUSA and the paper in January 1958 to seek a new life in California. The Rodneys moved from New York to Torrance, California, in 1958, where they lived for 31 years. Rodney continued to work as a journalist, most notably as the Religion editor of the Long-Beach Press Telegram. The Rodneys had two children, Amy and Ray, and later a granddaughter, Jessie. Rodney kept active all his life playing sports, and in his 60s saw success in his senior amateur tennis career, ranking as the #1 or #2 player in his age group in California until retiring from competition in 1998. In 1990, the Rodneys moved again, this time to Walnut Creek, California. Clare died in May 2004.

Rodney was inducted into the Baseball Reliquary's Shrine of the Eternals in 2005.

He celebrated his 96th birthday on April 17, 2007 in Walnut Creek, California with his partner, Mary Reynolds Harvey. Rodney died on December 20, 2009, at the age of 98.
