= Fred Ellis (cartoonist) =

American editorial cartoonist

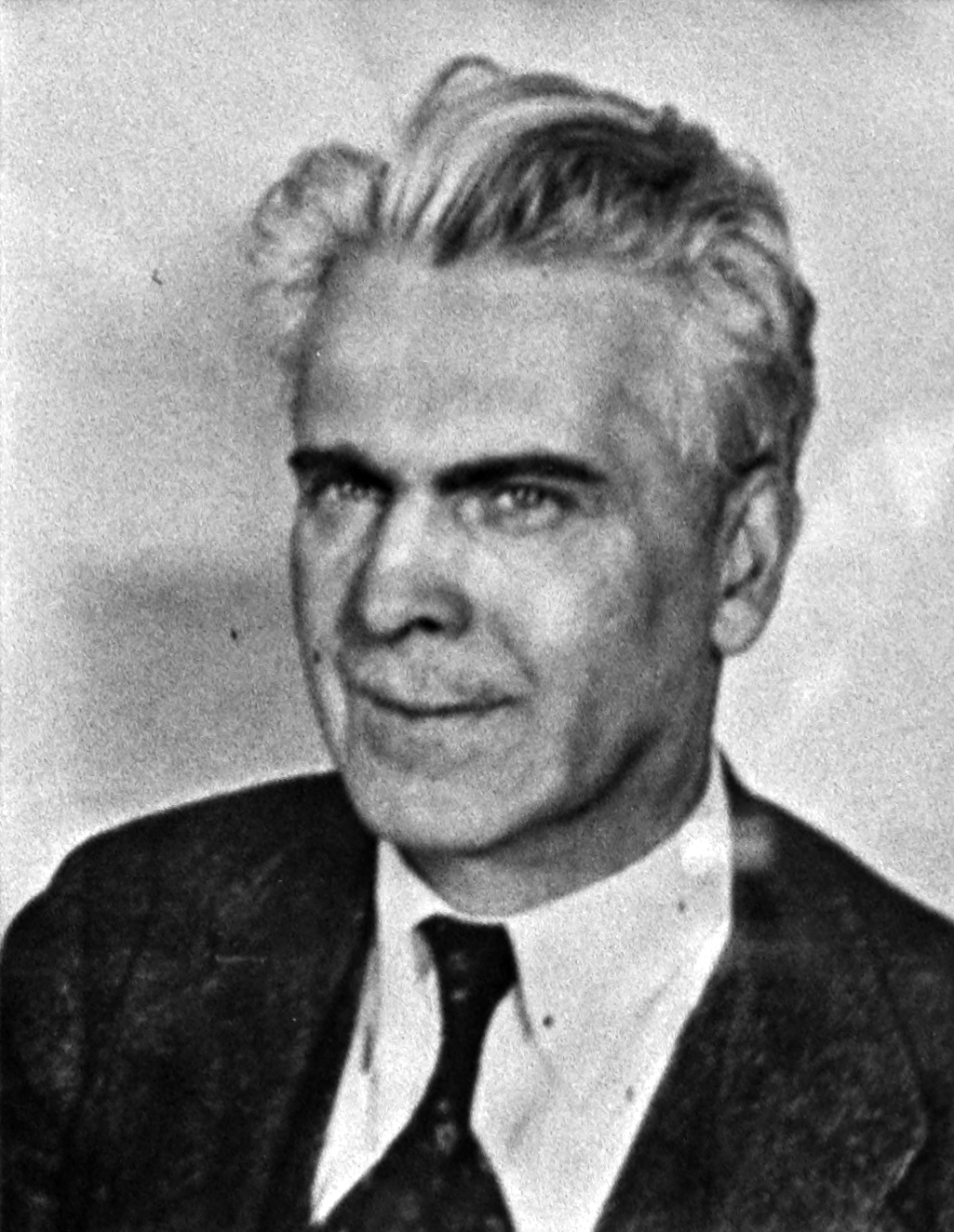
Ellis c. 1938

Fred C. Ellis (June 5, 1885 – June 10, 1965) was an American editorial cartoonist. He is best remembered as one of the leading radical artists of the 1920s and 1930s as an artist for various publications of the Communist Party, USA (CPUSA), including stints on the staff of the CPUSA's daily newspaper.

== Biography ==
=== Early years ===
Fred Ellis was born in Chicago, Illinois in 1885. He left school after eighth grade to take a job as an office boy for Frank Lloyd Wright. He worked later in an engraving shop and an ice cream factory before becoming a "trucker" at a meat factory, transporting prepared meat from refrigerators to railway cars for shipment around the country.

In 1905, the 20-year-old Ellis was among 20,000 Chicago packinghouse workers who went out on strike, with the truckers seeking a pay raise from the $1.98 the workers were then averaging per 12-hour day. The strike proved to be a failure, ended by the economic pressure exerted through the hiring of strikebreakers, and Ellis and his mates ultimately returned to work only to see their pay cut further.

Despite the poor rate of pay, Ellis nevertheless managed to save $100 over a three-year period, which he chose to invest in his education. Having a proclivity for drawing, Ellis enrolled in the Chicago Academy of Fine Arts where he studied art for two months, quitting after his finances were depleted.

=== Artistic career ===
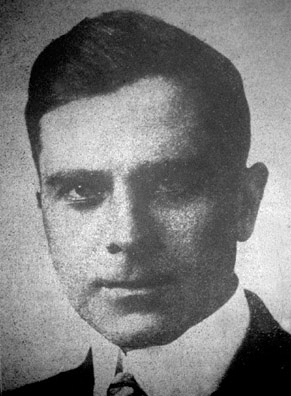
Ellis c. 1919

After leaving school Ellis became a sign painter, specializing in the painting of large outdoor signs. He ultimately worked for 21 years at this trade.

In 1919, while working as a sign painter for the General Outdoor Advertising Company, Ellis slipped and fell five stories from a scaffold outside of a Chicago building, breaking 32 bones when he hit the asphalt below. Ellis's convalescence proved to be extensive, including six weeks in the hospital followed by two years during which he was forced to use crutches and a cane. During this period of recovery, Ellis became familiar with a new weekly magazine published by the Chicago Federation of Labor called The New Majority — a publication which reprinted radical drawings by such leading political artists of the day as Art Young and Boardman Robinson. The injured sign painter began to work as a cartoonist, submitting his first political art to The New Majority.

Prominent communist labor leader William Z. Foster was the circulation manager of The New Majority at this time, and it was through him that Ellis made contact with the Workers Party of America, which he joined in 1924. Ellis drew extensively for the Communist movement from 1923 onward, contributing material to The Daily Worker. The Liberator, the Labor Herald, and other publications.

In 1927, Ellis moved to New York City to become staff cartoonist of the Workers (Communist) Party's official newspaper, The Daily Worker.

From 1930 to 1936, Ellis lived and worked in Berlin and Moscow, where he drew for Pravda, Izvestiya, and the English-language Moscow Daily News.

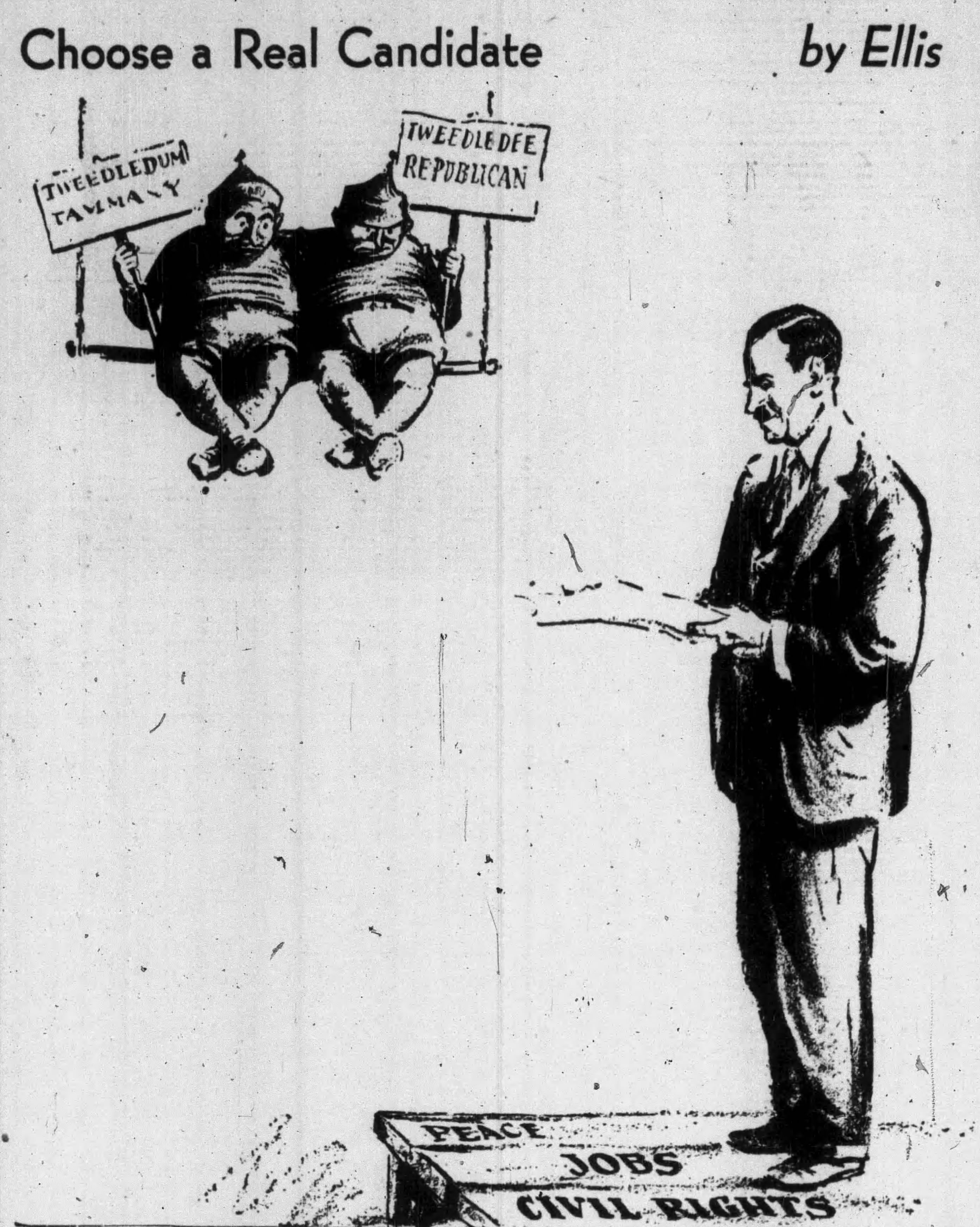
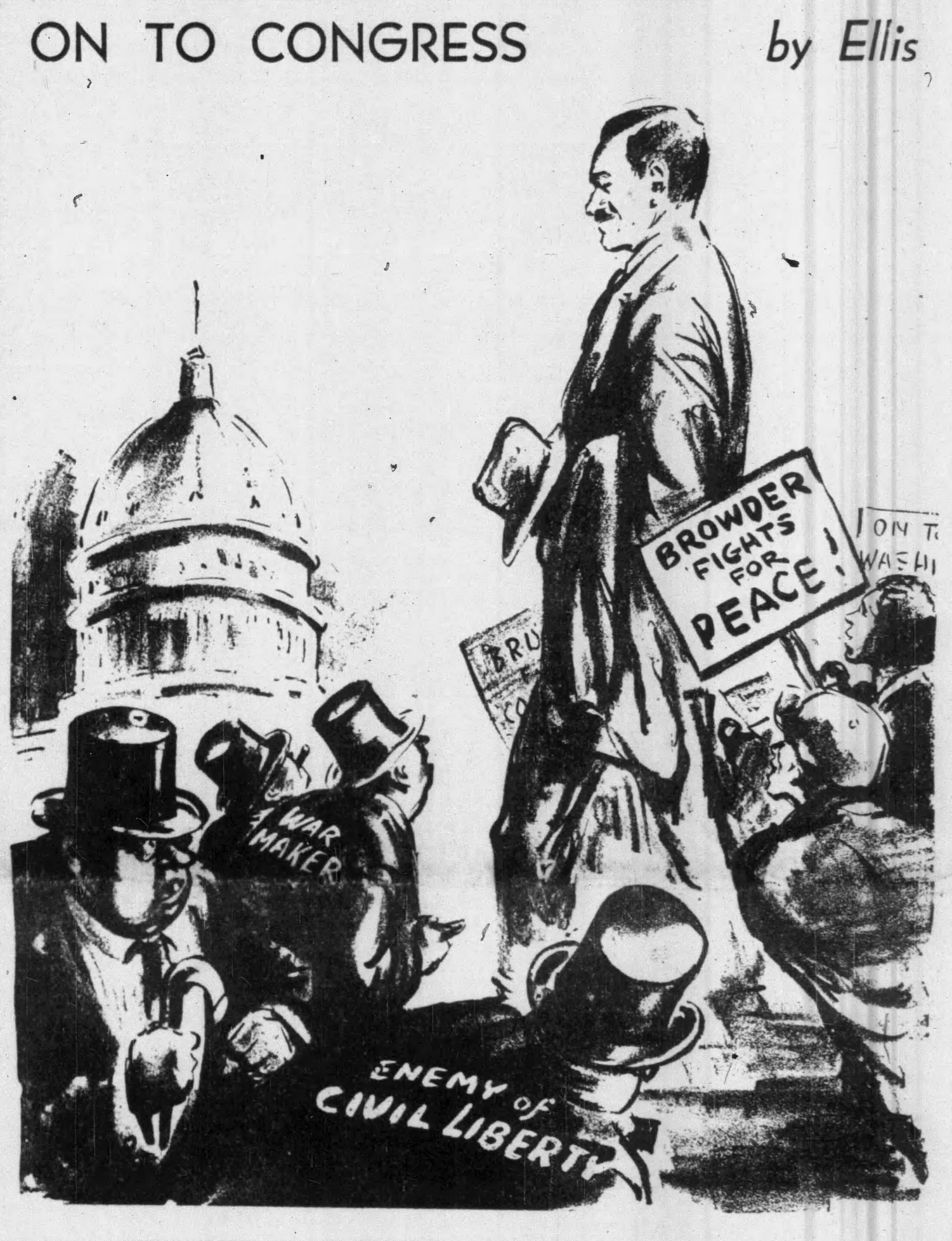
Political cartoons by Ellis published in the Sunday Worker promoting Earl Browder's candidacy in the 1940 special election in New York's 14th congressional district

In 1936 he returned to his job at the Daily Worker and taught at the American Artists School, a progressive independent art school directed by Harry Gottlieb whose board included many prominent left wing artists such as William Gropper as well as photographer Margaret Bourke-White.

Ellis retired in 1955.

=== Death and legacy ===
Fred Ellis died in 1965.

Ellis's papers are held by Syracuse University in Syracuse, New York. The material includes more than 250 original cartoons, a sketchbook with more than 200 sketches, letters, newspaper clippings, photographs, and other material.

== Daily Worker gallery ==
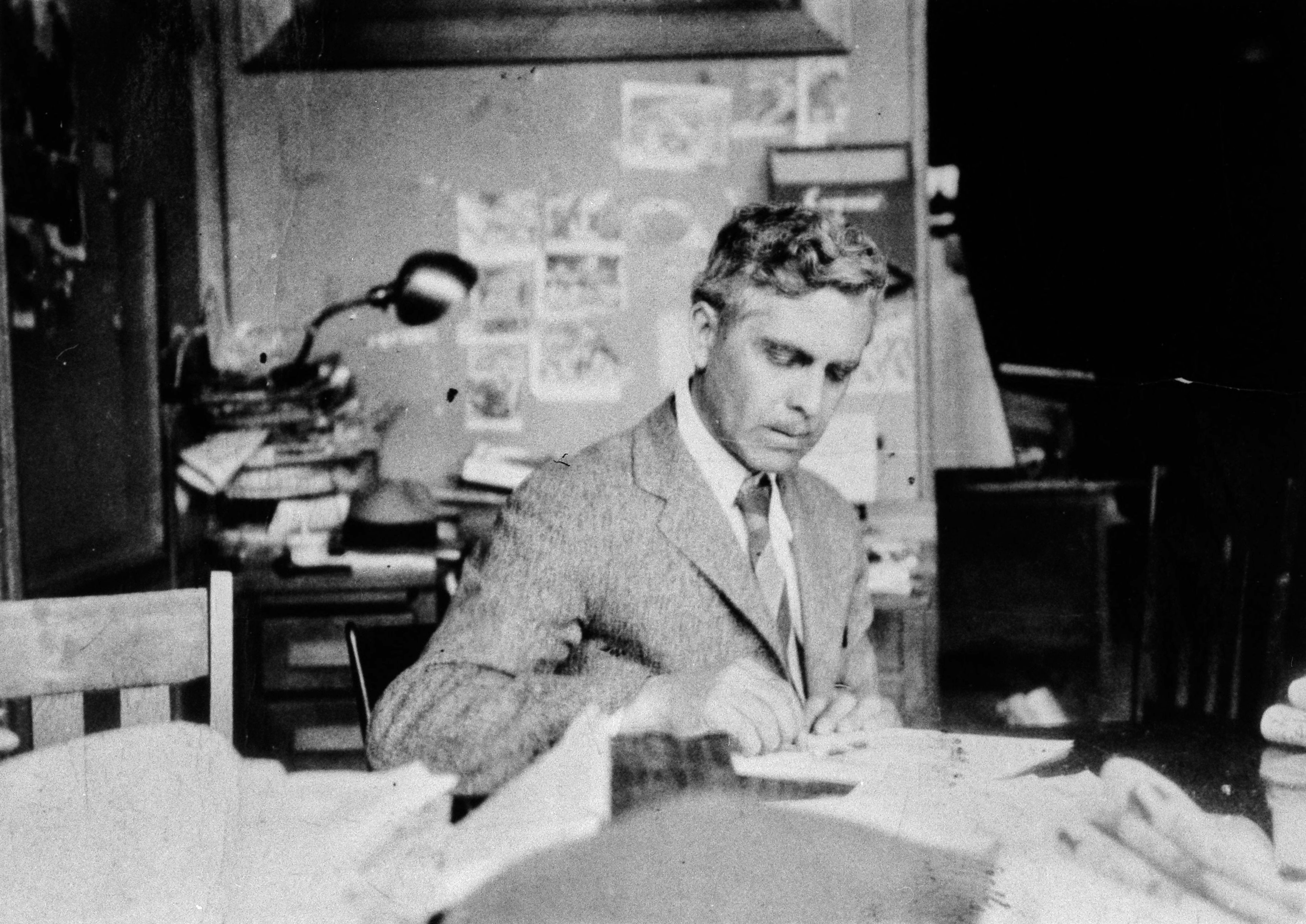
At his desk at the Daily Worker, May 1930

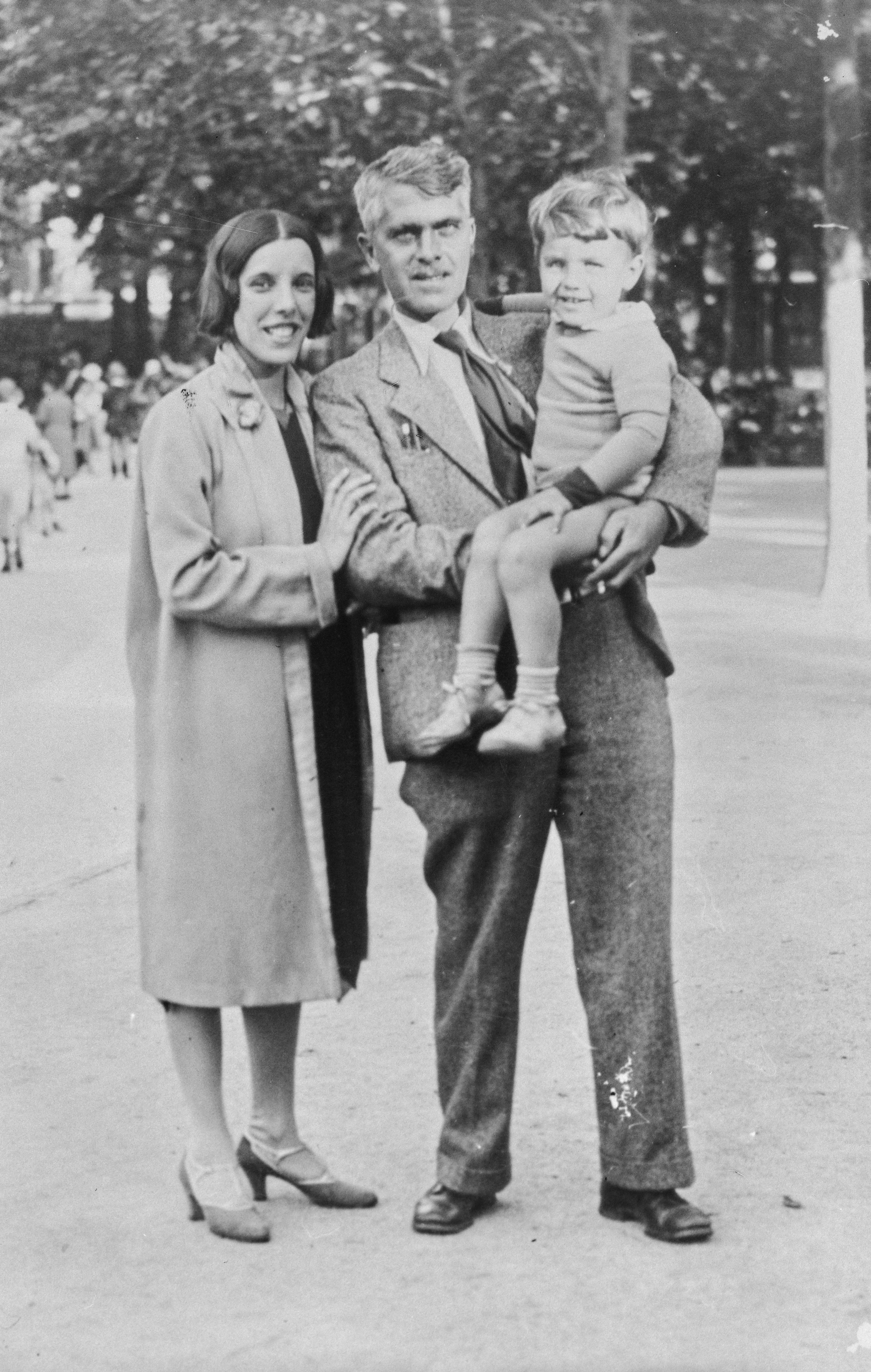
With his wife Ethel and son Bobby in Berlin, 1930

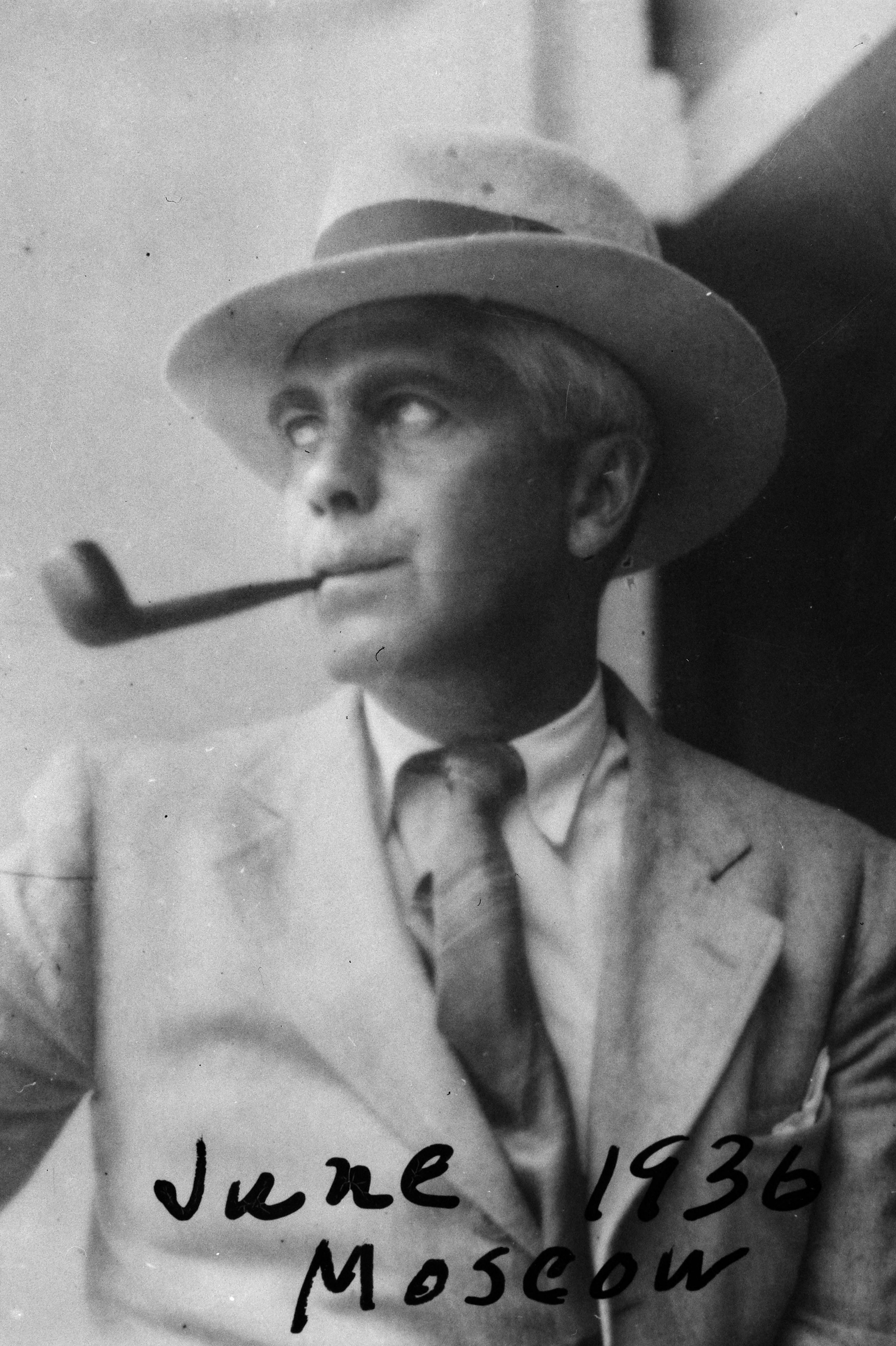
In Moscow, June 1936

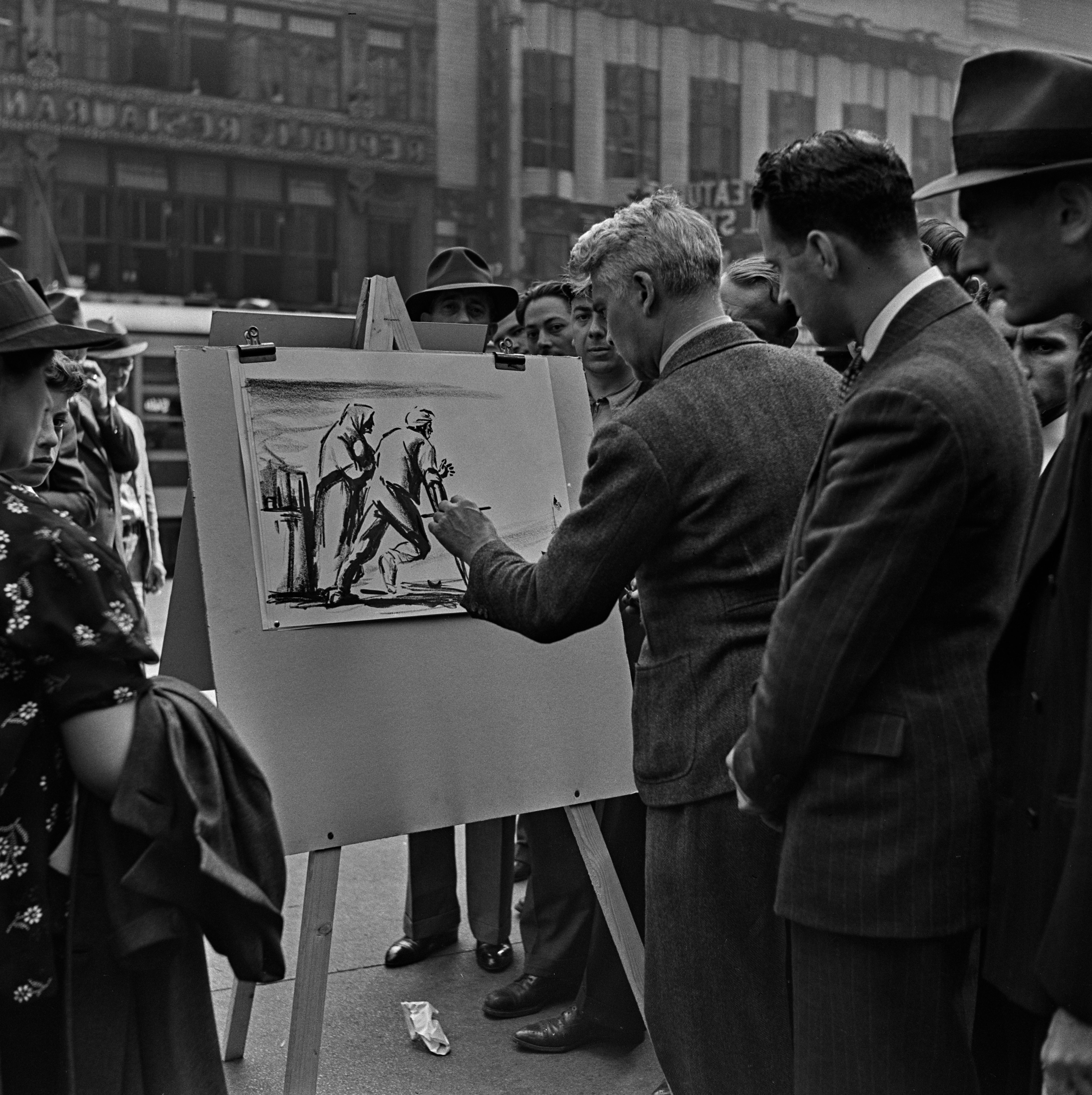
Drawing in Times Square, New York to raise money for the Loyalists in the Spanish Civil War, 1938

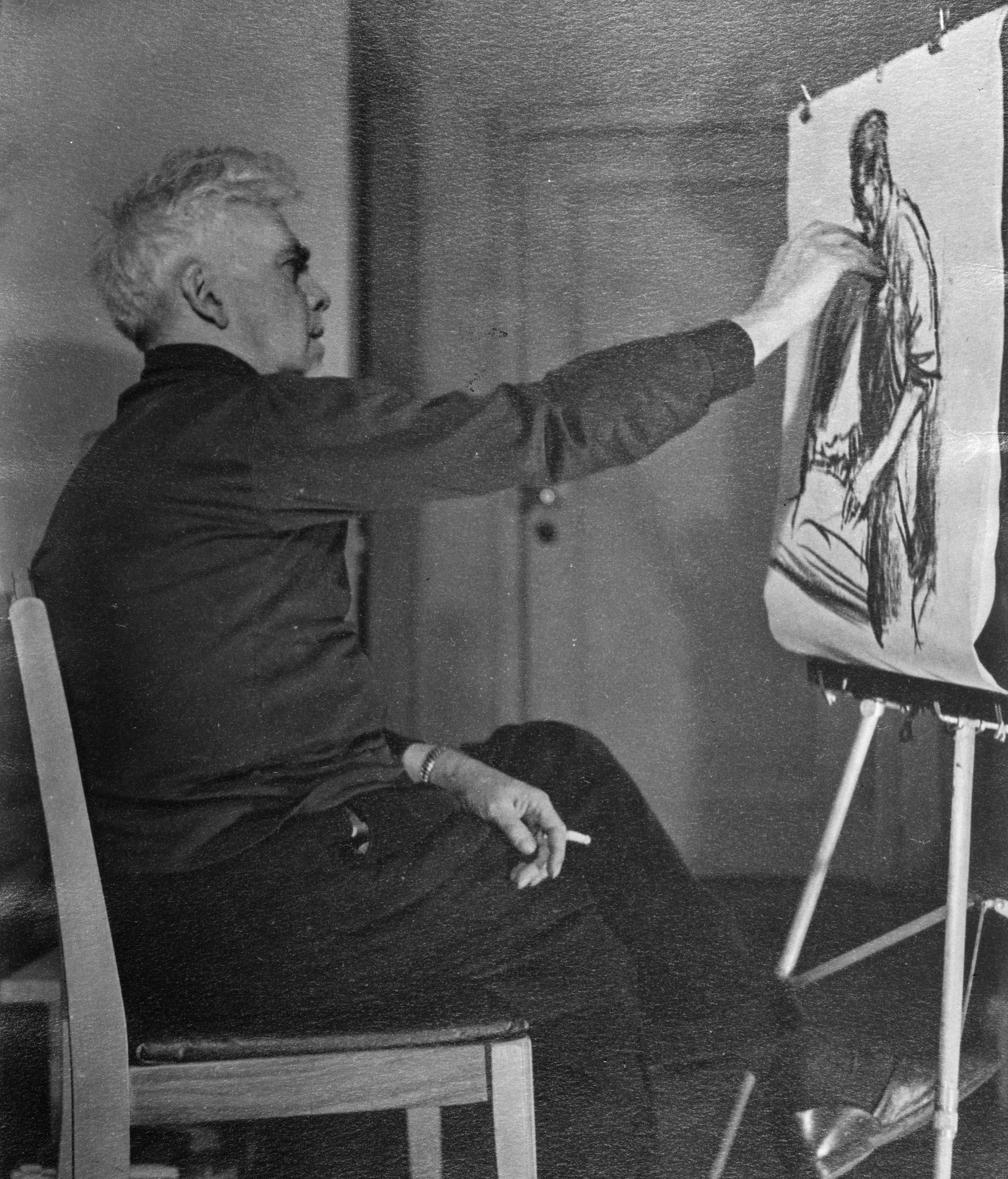
At work, March 1952

== Works ==
- Red Cartoons from the Daily Worker. With Jacob Burck. Sender Garlin, editor. New York: The Daily Worker, 1926.
