= Good Morning (magazine) =

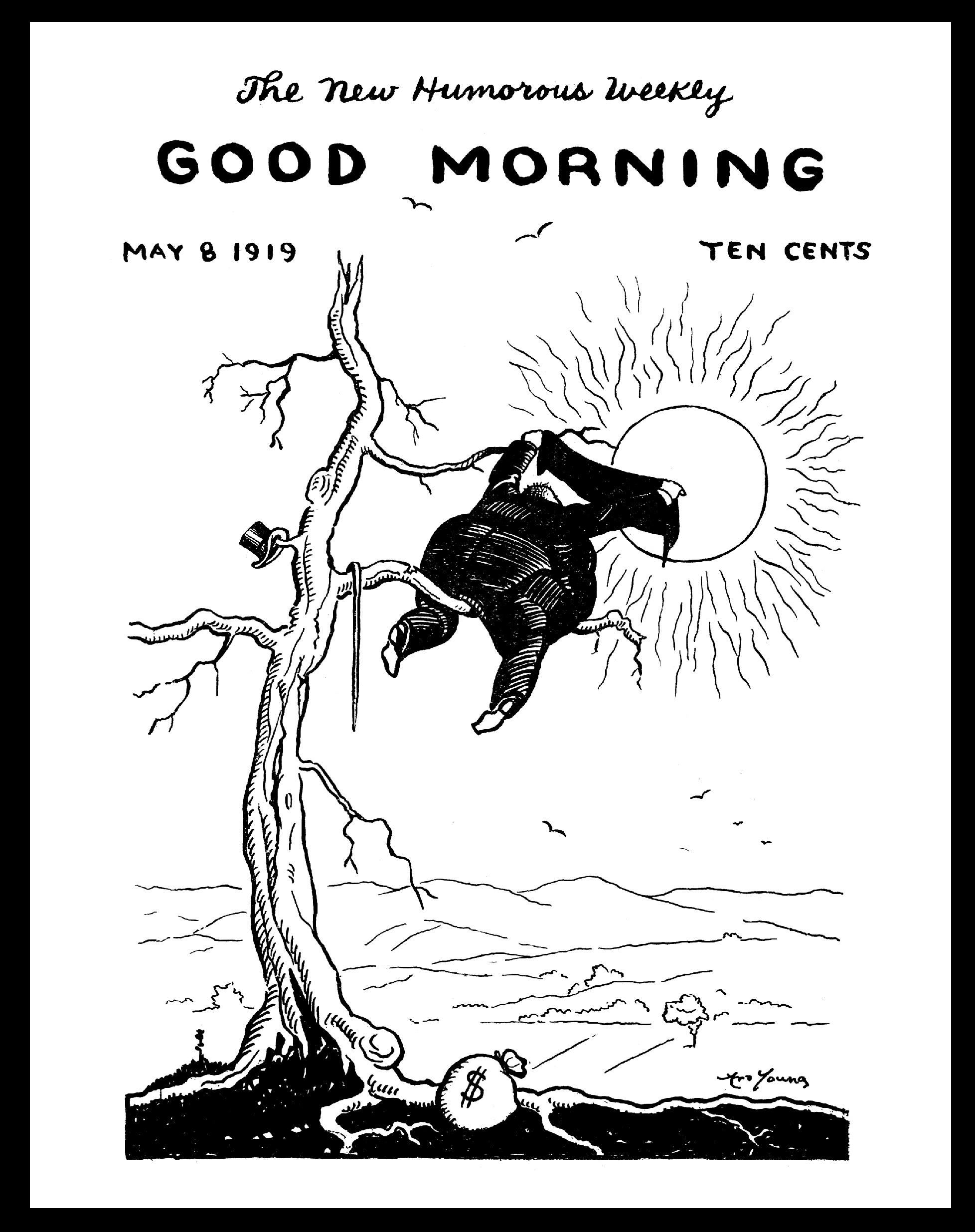
Cover of the debut issue of Good Morning magazine, featuring a drawing by publisher Art Young.

Good Morning was an American political humor magazine published launched in May 1919 by Ellis O. Jones, formerly an associate editor of Life magazine and veteran radical cartoonist Art Young. Both had worked together on the staff of the left wing monthly The Masses. Funded in large part by donations, the magazine was financially troubled from the outset and over time it was forced to decrease in frequency from weekly to semi-monthly to monthly. Costs still continued to outstrip revenues, however, and the publication was terminated in October 1921. An effort by Young to revive the publication in 1922 as the Art Young Quarterly failed after just a single issue.

== History ==
=== Establishment ===
The short-lived magazine Good Morning began early in 1919 through the joint efforts of 53-year-old cartoonist Art Young and a former associate editor of Life magazine, Ellis O. Jones. Young sought a new remunerative venue for his ink drawings and charcoal sketches since The Liberator, the primary magazine for which he drew in this period, was chronically short of funds and able to pay those engaged in the physical production of the magazine but not content contributors such as himself.

As Young later recalled:

"I had considered it a privilege to draw for the Liberator. But a few of us on the staff who had always been ready to contribute for nothing began to feel that it wasn't quite right that engravers, printers, paper dealers, and desk-editors should have their pay or the magazine would not go on, while those who did the creative work had to forego compensation. That was and still is a condition accepted by those who contribute to radical magazines which are not self-sustaining. Yet one's individual economic responsibilities sometimes call for a more fruitful arrangement."

"The Poor Fish," a recurring meme from Good Morning, reprised the "Henry Dubb" character of cartoonist Ryan Walker as an unthinking apologist for the capitalist system.

It was Jones, formerly associated with Young on the staff of The Masses, who originally suggested the launch of a new magazine. Young organized a meeting in a Manhattan restaurant to organize the new publication. This was attended by a number of prominent figures in the radical publishing community, including Managing Editor of the New York Call Charles W. Ervin, veteran political cartoonist Ryan Walker, and journalist Charles W. Wood, among others. Those gathered decided to attempt to reignite the dispirited socialist movement through a humor magazine which would "satirize the whole capitalistic works."

A discussion was held at the organizational meeting about a prospective name, taking the names of the existing humor magazines in various languages as a point of reference. Banter between Young and Jones generated the name Good Morning — a familiar phrase which intentionally played upon an advertising slogan in vogue at the time: "Good morning, have you used Pears Soap?" There were no misgivings expressed about this name by those in attendance.

As was the case with The Liberator, Young and Jones sought to capitalize their publication through donations from wealthy benefactors. For three months Young made the rounds of New York City's progressive establishment, soliciting operating funds for a new journal. Young and Jones set a target for themselves of raising $10,000 prior to the launch — enough to keep the new publication afloat financially for a year. With The Liberator and other publications competing for funding from the same limited set of donors, the monetary goal for Good Morning proved to be impossible to attain, however. Young and Jones decided to proceed with their new magazine despite having accumulated barely more than half of what they believed to be the necessary funds.

The first issue appeared dated May 8, 1919 in a press run of 10,000 copies. The inaugural issue of the new 16-page weekly quickly sold out and spirits ran high as congratulatory letters and promises of financial support began to flow into the magazine's editorial office, located in the so-called "People's House" at 7 East 15th Street, home of the Rand School of Social Science. Hopes for the publication's financial stability rested upon a belief that labor unions would contribute funds for bulk subscriptions and that unemployed men would sell the magazine on the street.

=== Development ===
About five months after the launch of Good Morning Ellis Jones became critical of the haphazard management of the business and resigned from the magazine. This departure left Art Young is sole possession of the franchise as editor and publisher. A steady stream of expenses took their toll, including the cost of a stenographer, paper, printers, and general office costs. Inadequate attention was paid to the selling of advertisements, which further imperiled the magazine's cash-flow. Circulation stood at about 4,000 copies per issue during the first year, supplemented by income generated by newsstand sales. Additional funds were raised through a series of banquets and dances.

Such frenzied efforts at fundraising managed to keep the wolf from the publication's door for a time.

Good Morning did actually make use of unemployed young men to make individual copy sales on street corners, with nearby Union Square being a popular sales location. Unfortunately, payment for these issues was not always received at the office, not only exacerbating the poor financial situation faced by the publication but angering secretary and office manager Betty Kaye. One day when Art Young was out of the office, a disheveled young man who looked like one of the unemployed Wobblies who made money selling Good Morning on the street came into the office asking for the editor. The frustrated Kaye sent him packing with a sharp, "If you want to peddle Good Mornings, we're through, do you hear? We're through with you bums!" Only latter did an embarrassed Kaye learn that she had summarily dispatched socialist author Upton Sinclair, in New York City on a visit from his home in California.

In response to its tight financial situation, Good Morning was moved to a semi-monthly production schedule. With its slogan now "To Laugh That We May Not Weep," the magazine kept its "independent, whimsical leftist slant."

=== Dissolution and brief reprise ===
Good Morning finally succumbed to financial pressures in October 1921, terminating publication with an issue bearing that date.

An effort was made to relaunch the publication under a new name, the Art Young Quarterly, in 1922, but the effort was stillborn, with only one issue of the revised magazine seeing print.

=== 2015 Revival ===
Good Morning was revived in November 2015 with Volume 4 in both digital and paper format. It is published in Bethel, CT where Art Young lived from 1904-1942 where he maintained the Art Young Gallery. The Bethel Historical Society mounted an exhibition of his work in April 2015. Bethel publisher Seraphemera books reprinted some of Art Young's work for the exhibition, including the entire original run of Good Morning from 1919-1921 and the Art Young Quarterly. This project then led to the revival of Good Morning itself with all new content and a Facebook page. The revival primarily publishes new work in the style of Art Young, with occasional reprints of Art Young's original cartoons if they are still relevant to current politics.

== Selected contributors ==
Writers:

- Howard Brubaker
- Miriam Allen DeFord
- Samuel DeWitt
- Mabel Dwight
- T. Swann Harding
- Art Shields
- Charles W. Wood
- Clement Wood

Artists:

- Cornelia Barns
- Maurice Becker
- William Gropper
- Robert Minor
- Boardman Robinson
- Hendrik Van Loon
- Frank Walts
- Alice Beach Winter

Source: Art Young, Art Young: His Life and Times, pg. 360.
