= SS Art Young =

Liberty ship of WWII

History

United States
- Name: Art Young
- Namesake: Art Young
- Owner: War Shipping Administration (WSA)
- Operator: A. L. Burbank & Co., Ltd.
- Ordered: as type (EC2-S-C1) hull, MC hull 2328
- Builder: J.A. Jones Construction, Panama City, Florida
- Cost: $923,878
- Yard number: 69
- Way number: 2
- Laid down: 5 October 1944
- Launched: 13 November 1944
- Sponsored by: Mrs.J.Philo Caldwell
- Completed: 22 November 1944
- Identification: Call sign: KYUK
- Fate: Placed in the National Defense Reserve Fleet, Wilmington, North Carolina, 30 December 1947; Placed in the National Defense Reserve Fleet, in Beaumont, Texas, 10 May 1952; Sold for scrapping, 31 January 1961, withdrawn from the fleet, 26 July 1961

General characteristics
- Class & type: Liberty ship; type EC2-S-C1, standard
- Tonnage: 10,865 LT DWT; 7,176 GRT
- Displacement: 3,380 long tons (3,434 t) (light); 14,245 long tons (14,474 t) (max)
- Length: 441 feet 6 inches (135 m) oa; 416 feet (127 m) pp; 427 feet (130 m) lwl
- Beam: 57 feet (17 m)
- Draft: 27 ft 9.25 in (8.4646 m)
- Installed power: 2 × Oil fired 450 °F (232 °C) boilers, operating at 220 psi (1,500 kPa); 2,500 hp (1,900 kW)
- Propulsion: 1 × triple-expansion steam engine, (manufactured by Filer and Stowell, Milwaukee, Wisconsin); 1 × screw propeller
- Speed: 11.5 knots (21.3 km/h; 13.2 mph)
- Capacity: 562,608 cubic feet (15,931 m^{3}) (grain); 499,573 cubic feet (14,146 m^{3}) (bale)
- Complement: 38–62 USMM; 21–40 USNAG
- Armament: Varied by ship; Bow-mounted 3-inch (76 mm)/50-caliber gun; Stern-mounted 4-inch (102 mm)/50-caliber gun; 2–8 × single 20-millimeter (0.79 in) Oerlikon anti-aircraft (AA) cannons and/or, 2–8 × 37-millimeter (1.46 in) M1 AA guns

SS Art Young was a Liberty ship built in the United States during World War II. She was named after Art Young, an American cartoonist and writer from Illinois. Young is best known for his socialist cartoons in the left-wing magazine The Masses.

== Construction ==
Art Young was laid down on 5 October 1944, under a Maritime Commission (MARCOM) contract, MC hull 2328, by J.A. Jones Construction, Panama City, Florida; sponsored by Mrs. J. Philo Caldwell, wife of the chief estimator at JAJCC, and launched on 13 November 1944.

== History ==
She was allocated to A. L. Burbank & Company, Ltd, 22 November 1944. On 15 April 1948, she was placed in the National Defense Reserve Fleet, in Wilmington, North Carolina. On 10 May 1952, she was placed in the National Defense Reserve Fleet, in Beaumont, Texas.

She was sold for scrapping, 10 August 1971, to Luria Bros. and Co., Inc., for $43,300. She was withdrawn from the fleet, 30 November 1971.

== Bibliography ==
- "Jones Construction, Panama City FL". www.ShipbuildingHistory.com. 13 October 2010.
- Maritime Administration. "Art Young". Ship History Database Vessel Status Card. U.S. Department of Transportation, Maritime Administration. This article incorporates text from this source, which is in the public domain.
- Davies, James (May 2004). "Specifications (As-Built)" (PDF). p. 23.
- "SS Art Young".
