= Alice Winter =

Alice Winter may refer to:

- Alice Beach Winter (1877–1968), American socialist and suffragist artist
- Alice Ames Winter (1865–1944), American litterateur, author and clubwoman
