= Alice Beach Winter =

American suffragette artist

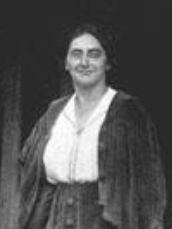
- Born: Alice Mary Beach; March 22, 1877; Green Ridge, Missouri, US
- Died: 1968 (aged 90–91)
- Resting place: Gloucester, Massachusetts, US
- Education: St. Louis School of Fine Arts
- Notable work: Why Must I Work
- Spouse: Charles Allen Winter

Alice Beach Winter (March 22, 1877 – 1968) was an early 1900s socialist and suffragist artist. She specialized in portraits of children, but also created post-impressionistic landscapes of the Northeastern United States. Beside her own exhibitions, she gained popularity through her works published in various socialist and suffrage periodicals.

== Personal life ==
=== Early life and education ===
Alice Beach Winter, daughter of Edgar Rice and Frances White Beach was an American artist and activist born on March 22, 1877, in Green Ridge, Missouri. She grew up in St. Louis, Missouri attended the St. Louis School of Fine Arts where she studied alongside other well known artists like George de Forest Brush, Joseph DeCamp, and John Twachtman. These artists all inspired her future work and her love for painting portraits and landscapes.

Along with her education, the unique environment and time-period that Winter grew up in influenced her desire to participate in the suffrage movement. During this post-Civil War period, Winter found community with other white, middle-class American women of the time such as Nina Allender, Blanche Ames, and Cornelia Barns. This group, through their individual drive and ambition, established a role for women that did not previously exist.

=== Marriage ===
Alice met her husband in St. Louis, who was at the time one of her instructors. She married Charles Allen Winter on January 4, 1904. The ceremony took place in her home, surrounded by her many friends, and was performed by Rev. Michael Burnham of Pilgrim Congregational church.

Winter's husband was an accomplished painter as well, that had works published in some of the same socialist and suffrage magazines like The Masses. His well known illustration, Joan, captured the symbol of freedom and feminism that Joan of Arc represented for people of the time. Charles, similar to his wife, also painted many landscapes in addition to his political and social work. One of the main reasons Alice preferred to work with child portraits instead of landscapes at first was to not compete with her husband.

Winter and her husband never had any children, but they did have several lodgers join them in their later years such as Louis Kronberg and Anna Hyde. During some summers in Gloucester they also were joined various artist friends they had such as John Sloan, Robert Henri, Leon Kroll, A.T. Hibbard, W.L. Stevens, Jane Peterson, and William Glackens.

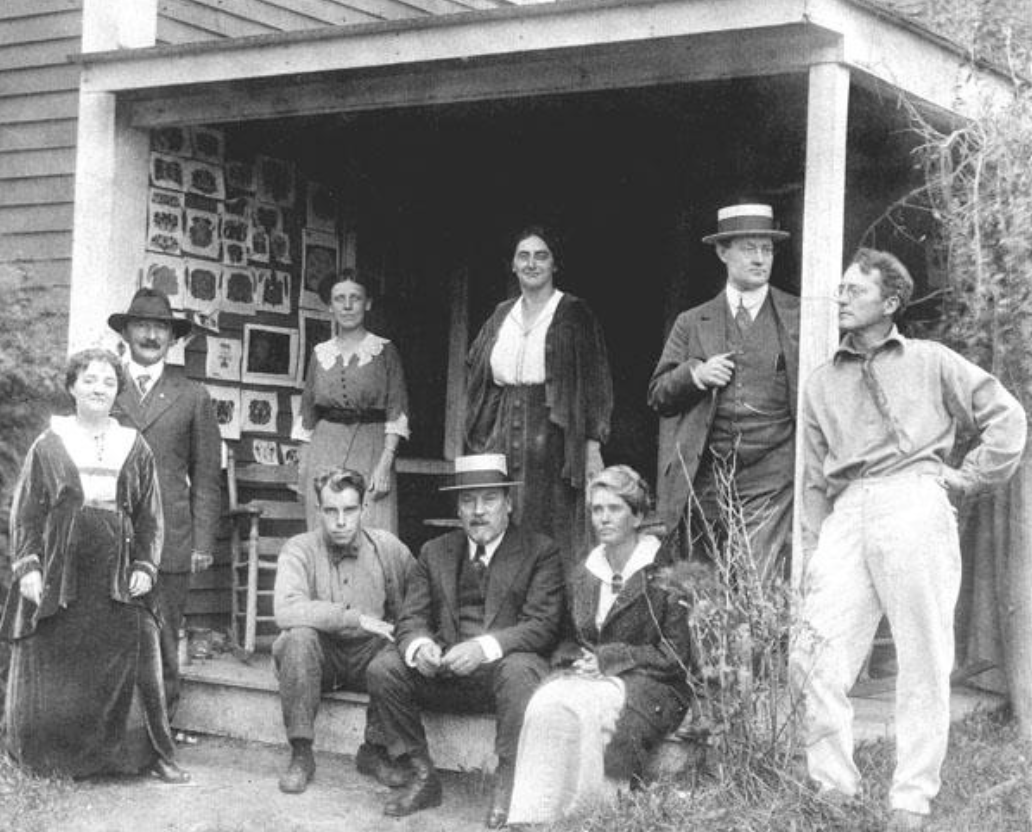
Artists in East Gloucester, 1915. Alice Beach Winter, third from left, standing.

=== Later life ===
Alice spent the first few years of her married life in New York. She and her husband spent summers in Gloucester, MA from 1914 to 1922, at which point they established a permanent studio there. In 1931, she and her husband became instrument teachers in the Cape Anne area in Massachusetts.

During their life together, Alice and her husband Charles dedicates much of their time to their art, supported by contracts from magazines throughout the Eastern United States. Biographers have credited the payment for these illustrations and cover designs with providing Alice with the time to create much of her known work.

Her husband, Charles Allen, died at age 72, on September 23, 1942.

Alice died in 1968 and was buried in Gloucester, Massachusetts.

== Career ==
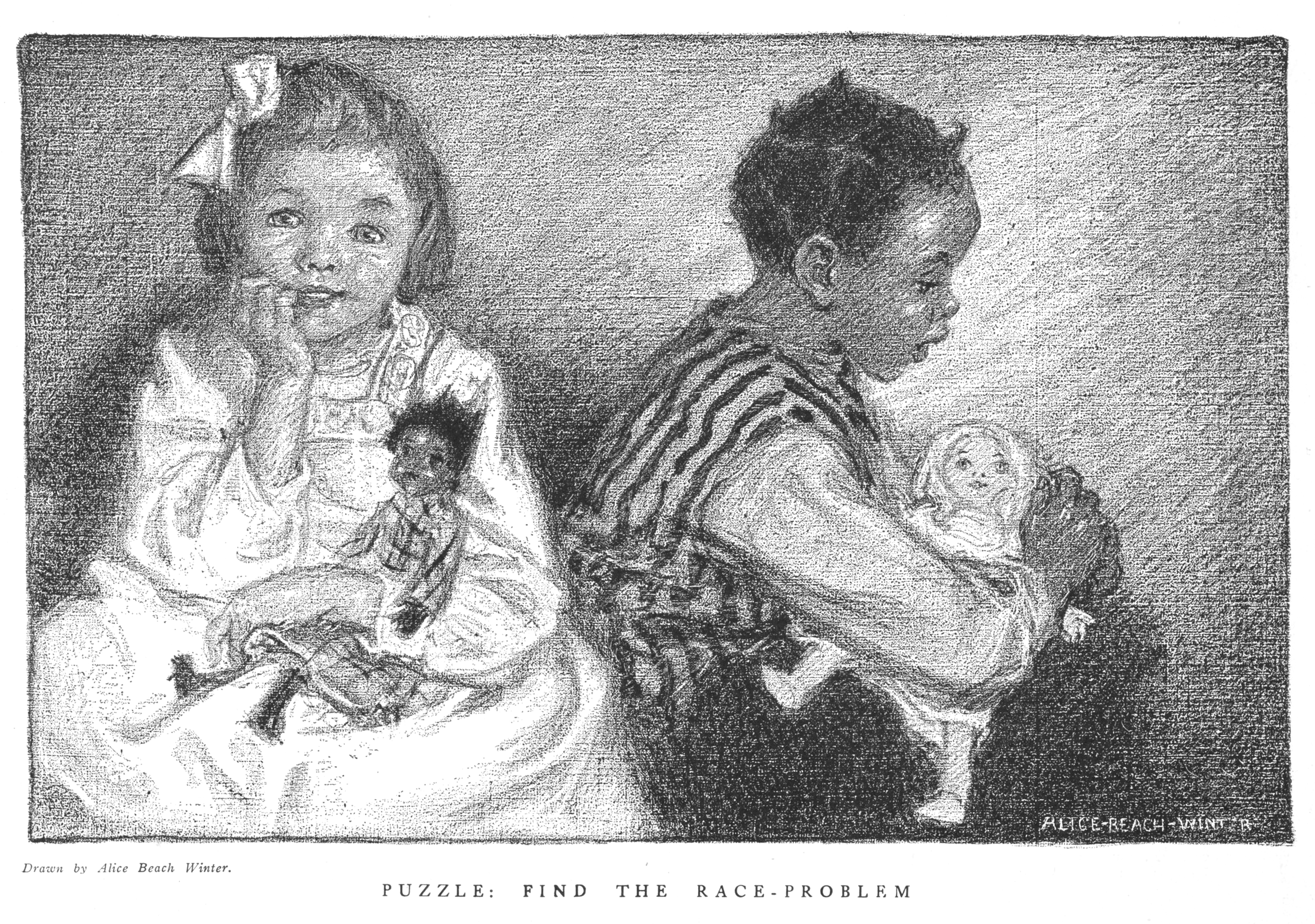
Puzzle: Find the Race-Problem by Alice Beach Winter featured in The Masses

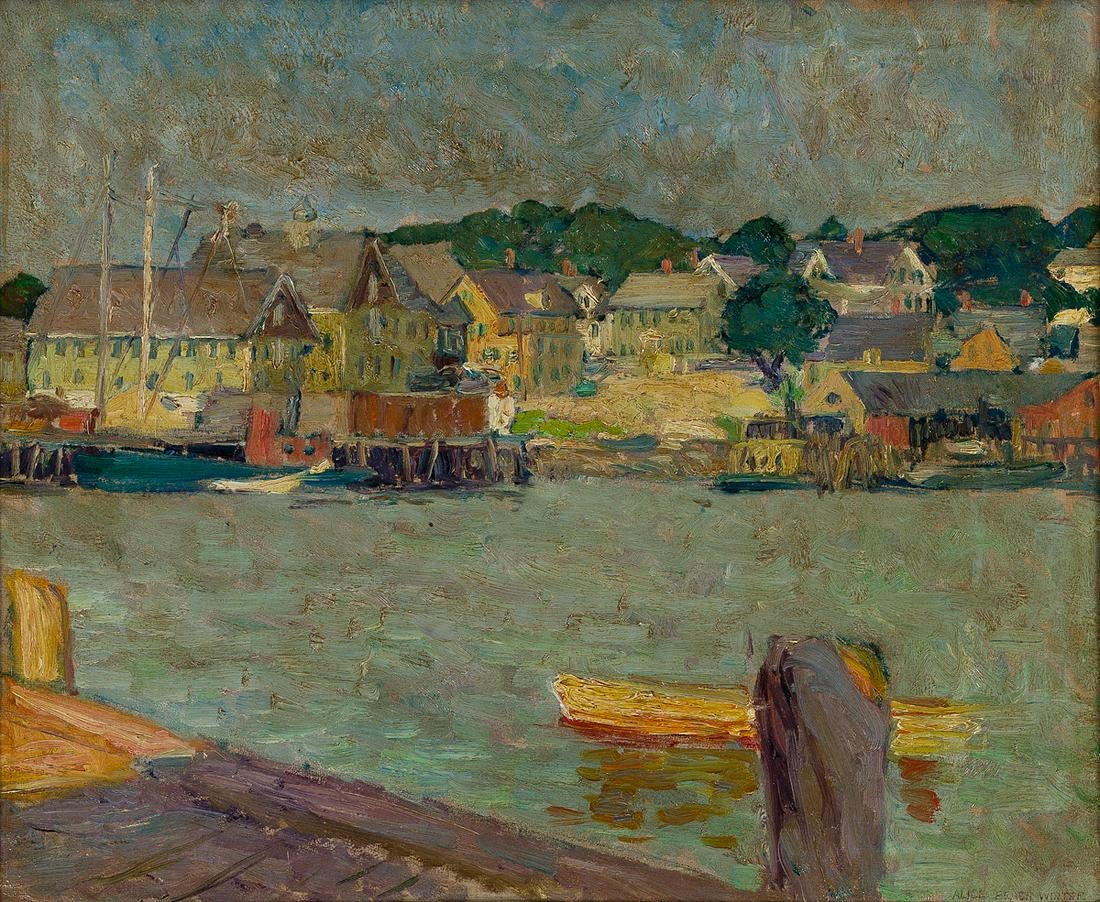
View of Gloucester by Alice Beach Winter

Alice Beach Winter used her artistic abilities to promote feminist and socialist ideals. She was particularly known for her illustrations that depicted different progressive ideals, with a focus on advocating for women's rights and suffrage. Her ability to capture the innocence and beauty of children in her portraits was also a major contributor to her fame as an artist. Winter's contributions to the suffrage movement were significant, and her illustrations were frequently featured in political magazines such as The Masses. This publication was known for promoting progressive ideas such as women's suffrage, equal opportunity, and labor inequality. Winter's illustrations played a crucial role in conveying these messages and advocating for social and political change. During the early 1900s, the rapid advancement of technology made spreading information through magazines and newspapers an increasingly powerful tool for reaching the public in a quick and captivating manner. Winter recognized the significance of this and contributed her illustrations to political magazines, helping to spread awareness of feminist and ideals to a broader audience.

Winter's involvement in illustrating political cartoons during World War I also suggests her deep commitment to using her artistic skills as a means of promoting social and political change. Through her illustrations, Alice Beach Winter made a lasting impact on the suffrage movement, helping to pave the way for future generations of women.

=== Exhibits ===
Winter's works have been exhibited in the following locations:

- National Academy of Design
- Pennsylvania Academy of Fine Arts
- Carnegie Institute
- St. Louis Art Museum (City Art Museum)
- Los Angeles County Museum of Art
- National Association of Women Artists
- St. Louis School of Female Artists

=== Well known artworks ===
Many of Winter's paintings focused on the beautiful sea and shore landscapes around her abode in Gloucester, MA. Works such as The Waiting Boat, The Old Pier, and The Study of Orange Rocks, were described as vibrant with stunning color effects. These paintings were large but had incredible brushwork, often resulting in displays having difficulty accommodating proper viewing distances.

As Winter progressed her skills and ideas, one can see her progress from simple yet impressive paintings such as Beside the Sea to more advanced paintings of nature such as Doris which could be classified as post-impressionistic, no longer focusing on details and realism, but instead on the effect and feeling of a particular scene.

In addition to her many paintings of the Gloucester shores, Winter also spent some time in Pasadena, California, where she created impressionistic works such as Almond Trees.

While Winter excelled at landscape impressionist painting, her true desire was to become well known as a portrait painter, particularly with children. One well known work of this category is Romance. Many of these paintings were done on a commission from some of some of Alice's acquaintances, such as Dickey featuring the son of Mr. and Mrs. John L. Hall, or Ginger featuring the daughter of Mr. and Mrs. George Higginson, both from Boston.

Why Must I Work by Alice Beach Winter as featured in The Masses

Prior to working on suffrage cartoons, Winter created socialist art in magazines such as The Masses including the well-known Why Must I Work that shows a “sad, doe-eyed girl” in front of a factory. This piece was aimed to combat the poor child labor laws that existed at the time, or lack of. These allowed her to express her opinions and begin to support women's rights leading up to her involvement in the women's suffrage movement. Some of these works were also reprinted in suffrage magazines at later dates.

Winter created many suffrage cartoons throughout her career, particularly in feminist papers such as Woman Voter. At the time, male artists only included girls in 3.2% of their works, while women included them in 8.3%. Winter played a large part in boosting this figure for women, with girls being at the center stage of many of her works, such as He ain’t got no stockin’s he’s poorer nor me.

Another interesting aspect of Winter's suffrage art is her inclusion of black children as well, which was rare for the time. Even though these people of color were not necessarily included in positions of authority or power, it was still a landmark change and step forward in this genre of art. Her work Puzzle: Find the Race-Problem, for example, shows a black child and a white child playing together with dolls of opposite skin color.

Throughout her life, Winter illustrated many children's books and stories such as Cyr’s New Primer, a work in a series of children's literacy tools.

=== Art organizations ===
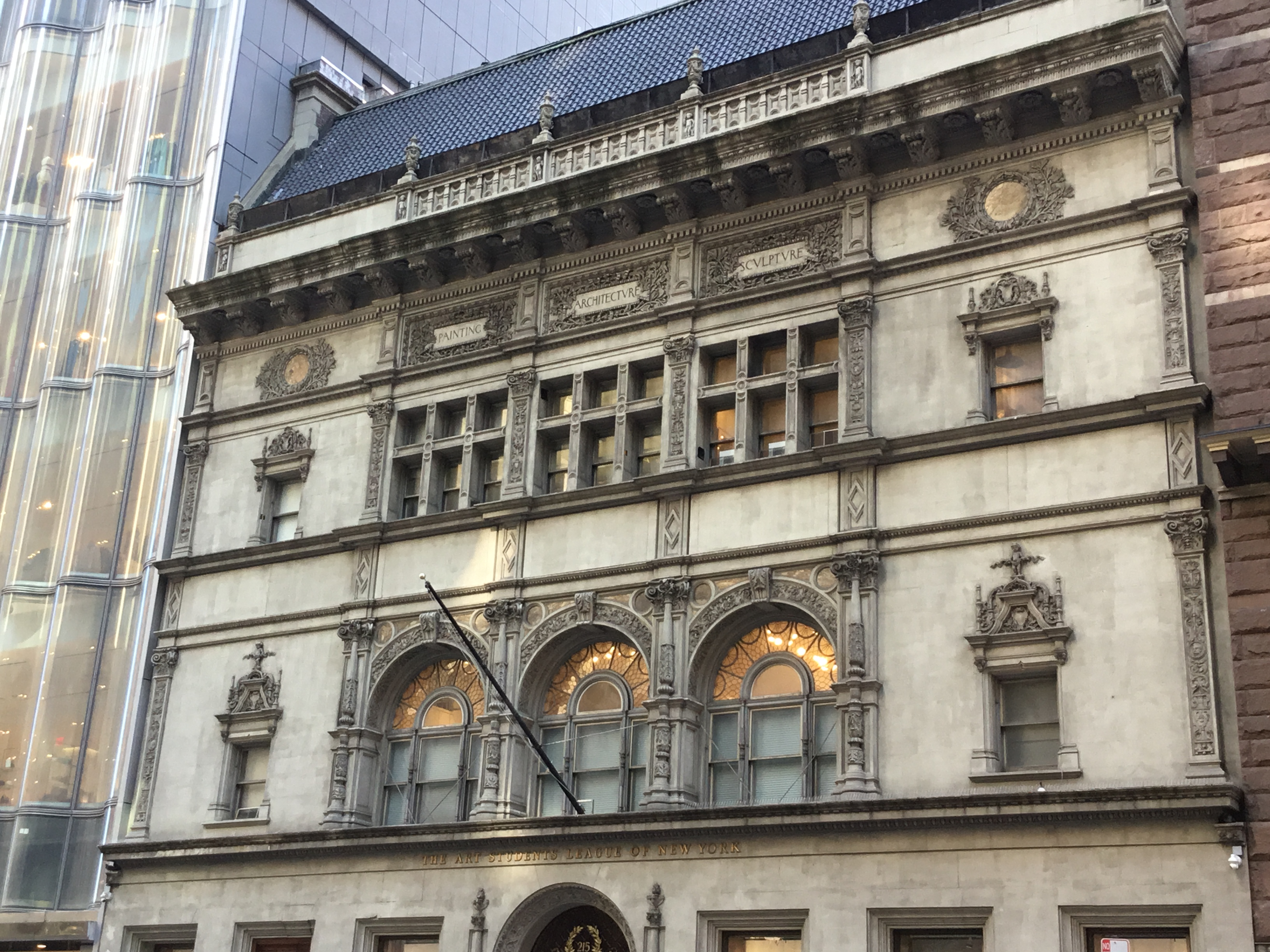
Art Students League of New York building

Winter was part of many artistic groups and organizations including the Art Students League, the North Shore Art Association, and the Gloucester Society of Artists.

Of particular note was Winter's involvement in a group known as the Ashcan School. It was originally founded from a complaint about The Masses, a magazine in which Winter was heavily involved, claiming that there were too many pictures of “ashcans and girls hitching up their skirts.” This group, much like Winter and her art, was representative of this era's political rebellion and unrest.

Winter also gained membership in the National Association of Women Artists, a prominent group that has promoted women's stories since the late 1800s.

== Legacy ==
The efforts of suffrage artists, like Alice Beach Winter, aided in the advancement of the 19th amendment. Political cartoons, posters, illustrations, and paintings exhilarated the push for gender equality throughout the United States. During World War I, political magazines containing suffrage cartoons demonstrated to citizens the positive effects of women in the workforce, furthering the acceptance of the women's rights movement. Today, she is known as one of the most influential and important suffrage artists.
