= Art Young =

American cartoonist and writer (1866–1943)

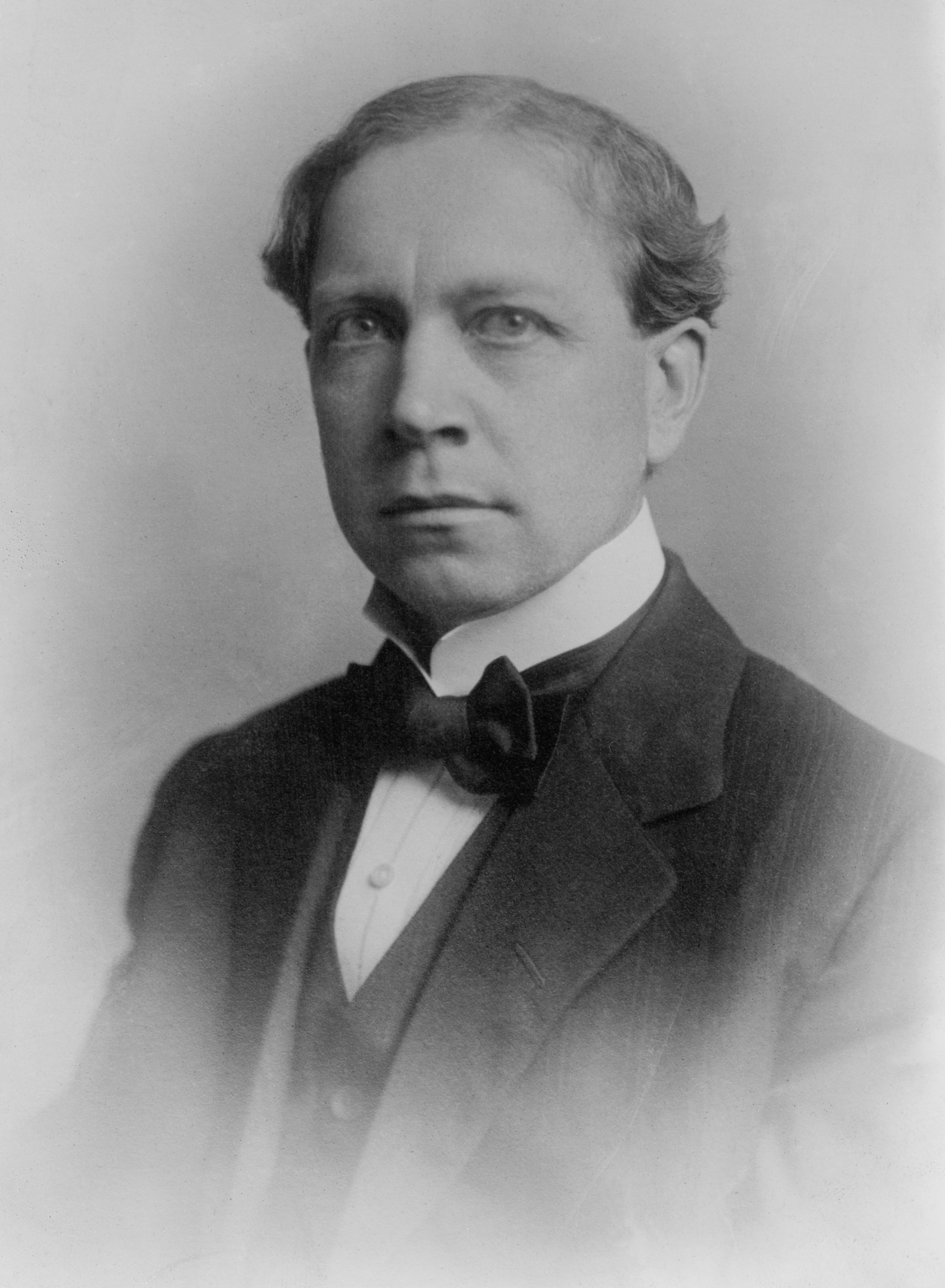
- Young, c. 1914
- Born: Arthur Henry Young; January 14, 1866; Orangeville, Illinois, U.S.
- Died: December 29, 1943 (aged 77); New York City, U.S.
- Education: Chicago Academy of Design; Art Students League of New York; Académie Julian
- Occupations: Cartoonist, writer
- Years active: 1884–1943
- Notable work: The Masses
- Political party: Republican (before 1904); Socialist (after 1904)
- Spouse: Elizabeth North (m. 1895)

Arthur Henry Young (January 14, 1866 – December 29, 1943) was an American cartoonist and writer. He is best known for his socialist cartoons, especially those drawn for the left-wing political magazine The Masses between 1911 and 1917.

== Biography ==
=== Early years ===
Art Young was born January 14, 1866, near Orangeville, in Stephenson County, Illinois. His family moved to Monroe, Wisconsin when he was a year old. His father, Daniel S. Young, was a grocer there; his mother was Amanda Young (née Wagner). He had two brothers and one sister. His brother, Wilmer Wesley Young, studied journalism at the University of Wisconsin and founded its student newspaper, The Daily Cardinal.

Young enrolled in the Chicago Academy of Design in 1884, where he studied under J. H. Vanderpoel. His first published cartoon appeared the same year in the trade paper Nimble Nickel. Also that year, he began working for a succession of Chicago newspapers including the Evening Mail, the Daily News, and the Tribune.

In 1888, Young resumed his studies, first at the Art Students League of New York (until 1889), then at the Académie Julian in Paris (1889–90). Following a long convalescence, he joined the Chicago Inter-Ocean (1892), to which he contributed political cartoons and drawings for its Sunday color supplement.

In 1895 he married Elizabeth North. In 1895 or 1896, he worked briefly for the Denver Times; then, after his separation with North, moved again to New York City, where he sold drawings to the humor magazines Puck, Life, and Judge, and drew cartoons for William Randolph Hearst's New York Evening Journal and Sunday New York American. From 1902 to 1906, he studied rhetoric at Cooper Union to improve his skills as a cartoonist.

=== The Masses ===
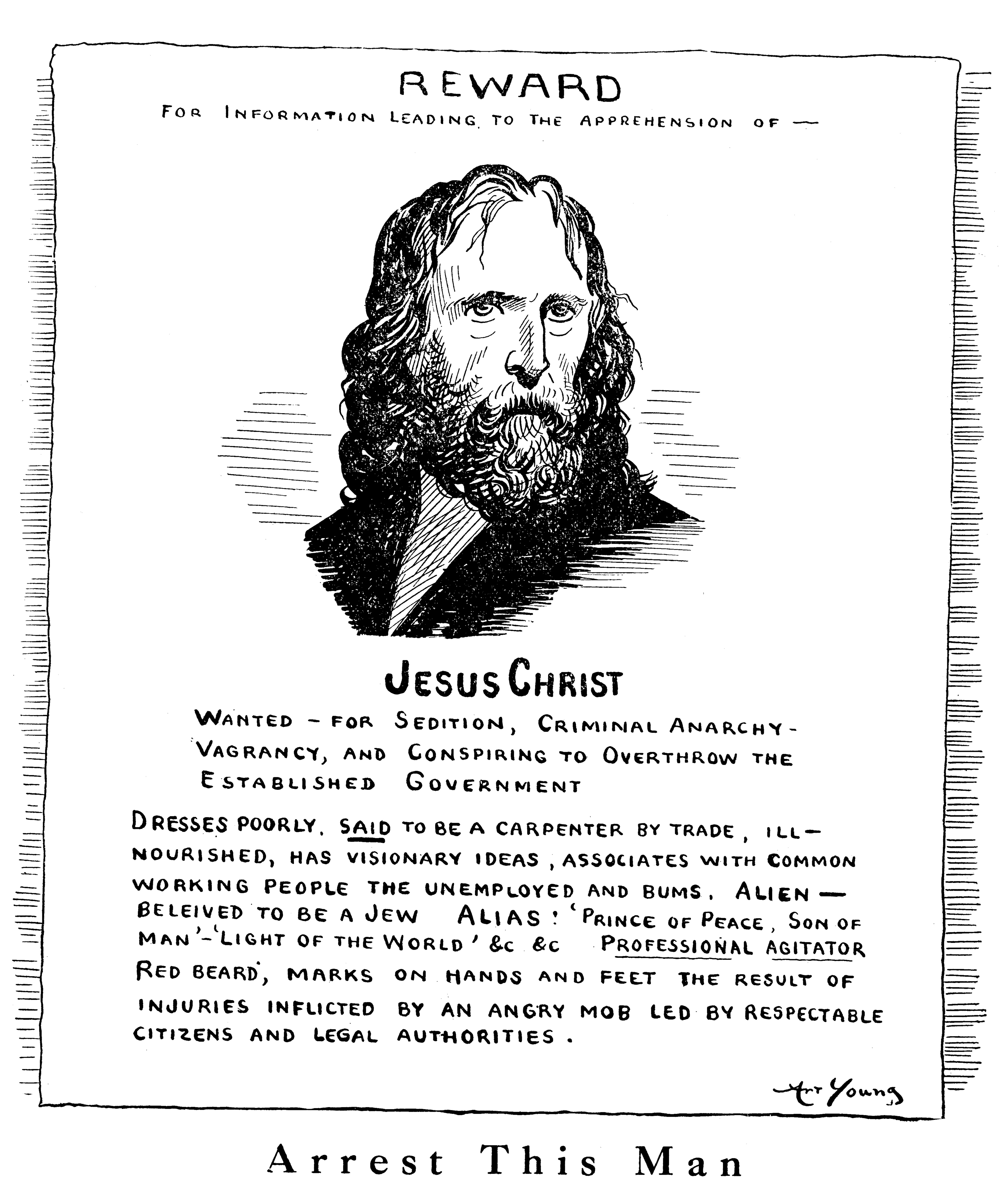
Political cartoon by Art Young, first published in Young's magazine, Good Morning, Aug. 1921

Young started out as a generally apolitical Republican, but gradually became interested in left wing ideas, and by 1906 or so considered himself a socialist. He began to associate with such political leftists as John Sloan and Piet Vlag, with both of whom he would work at the radical socialist monthly The Masses. He became firmly ensconced in the radical environment of Greenwich Village after moving there in 1910. He became politically active, and by 1910, racial and sexual discrimination and the supposed injustices of the capitalist system became prevalent themes in his work. He explained these sentiments in his autobiography, Art Young: His Life and Times (1939):

I am antagonistic to the money-making fetish because it sidetracks our natural selves, leaving us no alternative but to accept the situation and take any kind of work for a weekly wage [...] We are caught and hurt by the system, and the more sensitive we are to life's highest values the harder it is to bear the abuse.

In an attempt to curb the "abuse" he alleged, Young ran for the New York State Assembly on the ticket of the Socialist Party of New York (part of the Socialist Party of America) in 1913, but was unsuccessful.

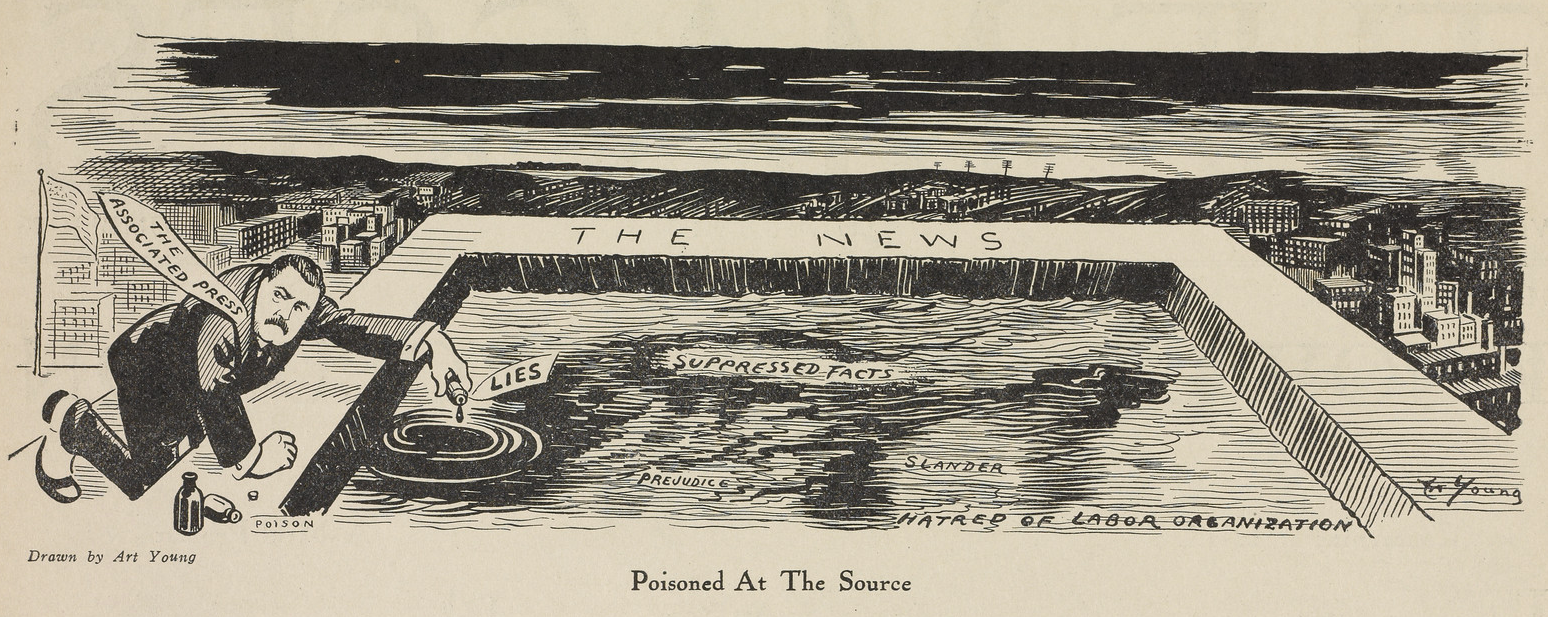
"Poisoned at the Source" (1913), cartoon by Young attacking the Associated Press

One facet of the establishment Young challenged in his cartoons and drawings was the Associated Press. His attacks became overt and damning once he joined the staff of the Masses as a co-editor and contributor, which he held from 1911 to 1918. He was one of the few original editorial members that stayed with the magazine for its entire run until it folded in December 1917. In July 1913, it published Young's cartoon "Poisoned at the Source", depicting the AP's president, Frank B. Noyes, poisoning a well labeled "The News" with lies, suppressed facts, slander, and prejudice. The cartoon was the papers explanation for the lack of national news coverage on the Paint Creek–Cabin Creek strike of 1912 in Kanawha County, West Virginia, which lasted more than a year, and which was characterized by deadly clashes between armed and striking miners and the militia hired to defend the coal companies. The companies successfully petitioned the Federal government to declare martial law under a military tribunal, an egregious act according to the editors of the Masses.

That little had been heard of these occurrences outside of West Virginia troubled the magazine's staff. Young's cartoon and Max Eastman's editorial, published in the same issue, claimed the AP willfully suppressed the facts to aid the coal companies. The AP responded to this with two suits of libel against Eastman and Young in November 1913 and January 1914. When Young and Eastman's attorney subpoenaed the records of the AP's Pittsburgh office, the suits were dropped; the paper said because AP feared the evidence and testimony would be damaging if they became public.

=== The Liberator ===
In 1918 Young helped to establish a similar publication to the Masses, the Liberator. He also served as an illustrator and Washington correspondent for Metropolitan Magazine (1912–1917) until it released him due to his outspoken anti-war sentiments. In 1918, he again ran unsuccessfully for public office on the Socialist ticket, this time for the New York State Senate.

Unhappy with how editors Max and Crystal Eastman and other staff members were able to live off of the struggling magazine, while he received a nominal fee or worked pro bono, Young left The Liberator in 1919 to start a magazine of his own, Good Morning. It was later absorbed by the Art Young Quarterly in 1922.

=== Other publications ===
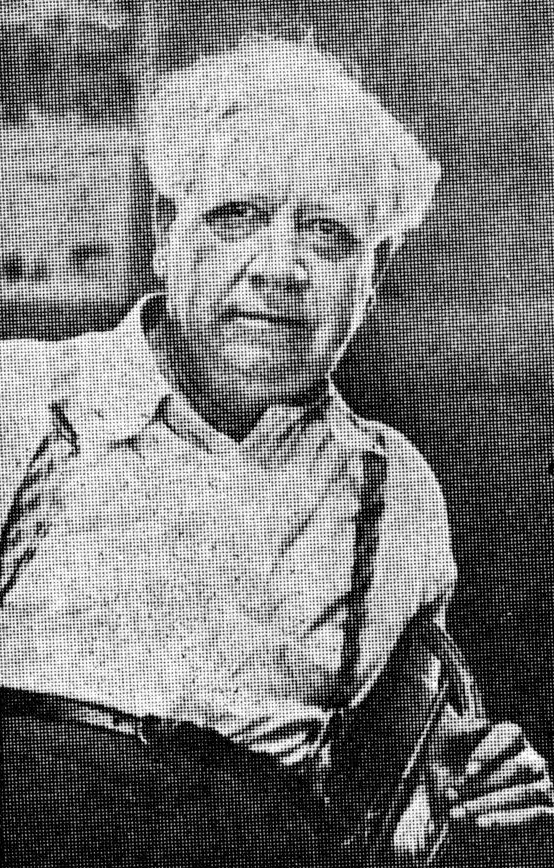
Portrait by Frederick Hier c. 1939

Young also contributed illustrations to The Nation, The Saturday Evening Post and Collier's Weekly, The New Leader, New Masses, The Coming Nation, Dawn, The Call, The New Yorker (after 1930), and Big Stick. He wrote many books, including two autobiographies, On My Way (1928) and Art Young: His Life and Times (1939). Of special note are his series of drawings depicting Hell, published in The Cosmopolitan and in several books, including Through Hell With Hiprah Hunt (1901). He issued a collection of his drawings, The Best of Art Young, in 1936.

=== Legal difficulties ===
==== First Masses trial ====
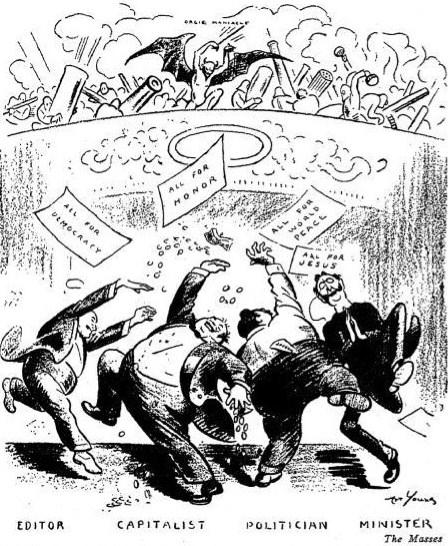
Having Their Fling by Art Young was brought into court as evidence during the second trial in September/October 1918.

Young continued to incur legal trouble with his drawings during his years at the Masses. In October 1917, the federal government charged Young, Max Eastman, John Reed, Floyd Dell, Merrill Rogers and a one-time contributor with conspiracy to impede enlistment under the Espionage Act. When their trial began in April the next year, Young was asked to justify his cartoon "Having Their Fling", in which four men—an editor, a capitalist, a politician and a minister—are depicted dancing in orgiastic bliss as Satan leads a band of war implements. Young blandly stated he was simply illustrating General Sherman's well-known saying that "war is hell." It seemed appropriate to him, then, to have Satan as the conductor. The first trial ended in a hung jury, with 11–1 for conviction.

==== Second Masses trial ====
The second trial began in September 1918. It was as full of humor and irreverence as the first—but perhaps more humorous for historians than for Young. Throughout the trial, Young had the tendency to nap, an act that brought him dangerously close to being charged with contempt of court. Afraid that Young would get into more trouble than he already was, his attorneys insisted he be awakened and given a pencil and pad, which he used to compose a self-portrait. The drawing, "Art Young on Trial for His Life", appeared in the Liberator in June 1918. It depicted Young slumped in a chair, dozing the trial away.

Young's propensity for napping worked to his advantage during the closing arguments. Prosecutor Barnes, wrapped in an American flag and giving a moving speech, told a story of a dead soldier in France. This soldier, Barnes claimed, "is but one of a thousand whose voices are not silent. He died for you and he died for me. He died for Max Eastman. He died for John Reed. He died for Merrill Rogers. He demands that these men be punished." Roused from his slumber by the impassioned speech, Young exclaimed, "What! Didn't he die for me too?" The beautiful oration successfully ruined, the second jury was unable to convict or acquit. Eight jurors voted for acquittal and four for conviction. It was the last time Young appeared in court for the charges, as they were dropped after failing twice to garner any convictions.

=== Death ===
Young died on December 29, 1943, at the Hotel Irving in New York City, at age 77.

== Works ==
- Hell Up to Date: The Reckless Journey of R. Palasco Drant, Newspaper Correspondent, Through the Infernal Regions, as Reported by Himself. Chicago: F. J. Schulte, July 1894.
- Author's Readings. Frederick A. Stokes, 1897.
- Through Hell with Hiprah Hunt. New York: Zimmerman, 1901.
- Trees at Night. New York: Boni and Liveright, 1927.
- On My Way: Being the Book of Art Young in Text and Picture. New York: Liveright, 1928.
- Art Young's Inferno: A Journey Through Hell Six Hundred Years After Dante. New York: Delphic Studios, 1934. Reprinted by Fantagraphics Books, 2020, with introductory material by Steven Heller and Glenn Bray.
- The Best of Art Young. Introduction by Heywood Broun. New York: Vanguard Press, 1936.
- Thomas Rowlandson. New York: Willey, 1938.
- Art Young: His Life and Times. Edited by John Nicholas Beffel. New York: Sheridan, 1939.
- Types of the Old Home Town. Bethel: Seraphemera, 2015.

== Legacy and honors ==
Young's papers are housed in the Special Collections Library of the University of Michigan in Ann Arbor.

The World War II Liberty ship SS Art Young was named in his honor.

== See also ==
- Good Morning (magazine)
