= Jane Peterson =

American painter (1876–1965)

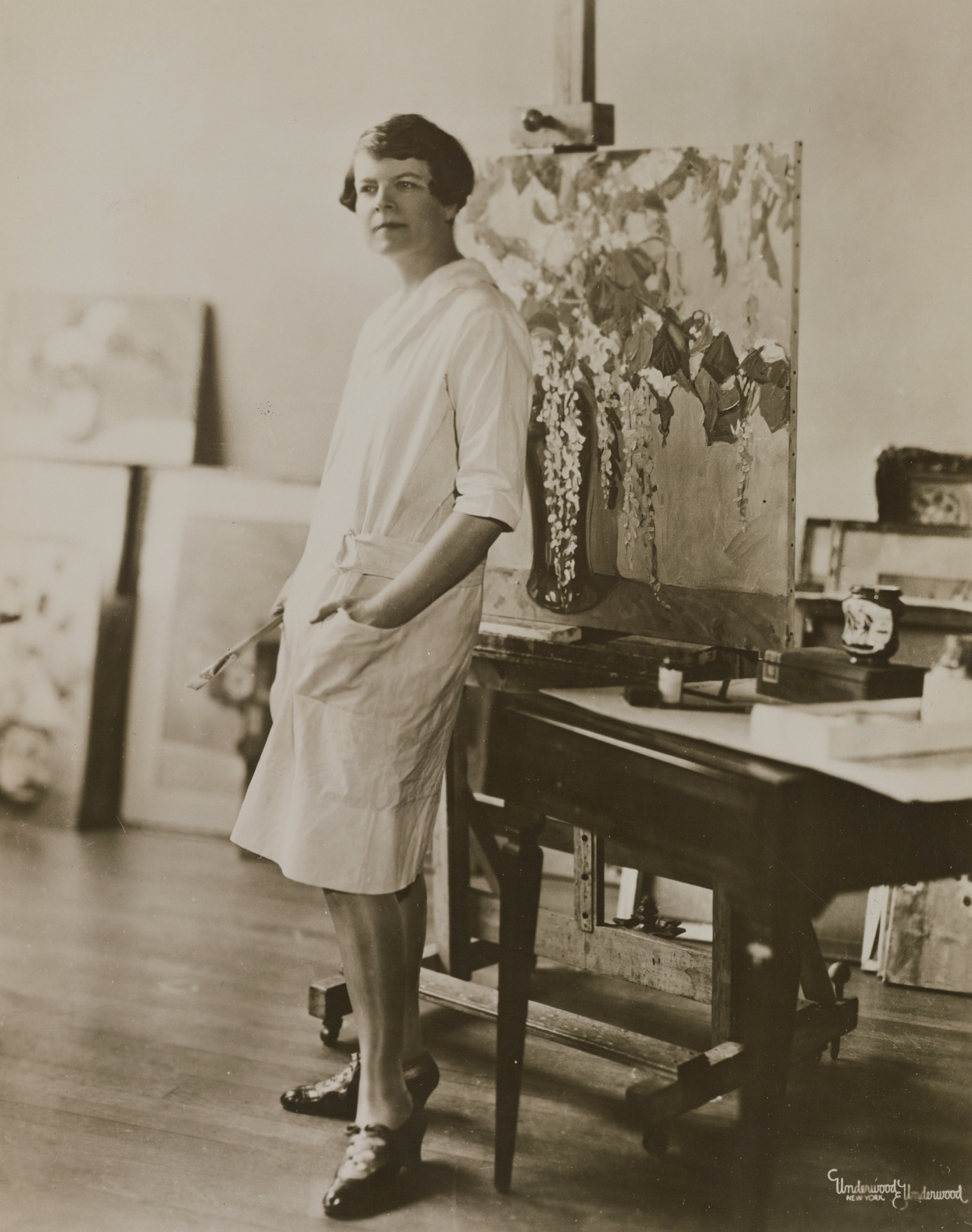
- Peterson at her easel, c. 1928 (Underwood & Underwood)
- Born: Jennie Christine Peterson; November 12, 1876; Elgin, Illinois
- Died: August 14, 1965 (aged 88); Leawood, Kansas
- Known for: Painting
- Movement: blend of Impressionist and Expressionist
- Spouse(s): M. Bernard Philipp (widowed), James S. McCarty

Jane Peterson (1876–1965) was an American Impressionist and Expressionist painter. Her works use broad swaths of vibrant colors to combine an interest in light and in the depiction of spontaneous moments. She painted still lives, beach scenes along the Massachusetts coast, and scenes from her extensive travels. Her works are housed in museums such as the Metropolitan Museum of Art, the Museum of the City of New York, the National Museum of Women in the Arts and the Hirshhorn Museum in Washington D.C., and the Pennsylvania Academy of the Fine Arts and the Philadelphia Museum of Art in Philadelphia, Pennsylvania. She was a fellow of the National Academy of Design and taught at the Art Students League from 1913 to 1919. During her lifetime, Peterson was featured in more than 80 one-woman exhibitions.

== Biography ==
=== Early life ===
Peterson was born in Elgin, Illinois, on November 28, 1876, as the daughter of an Elgin Watch Company employee and a homemaker. Though she was born as Jennie Christine, she changed her name to Jane right after she graduated from high school, in 1894. She did not receive any formal art training as a child. At the 1893 Columbian Exposition in Chicago, she had the opportunity to view works by avant-garde Impressionist American artists such as Childe Hassam and Edmund Tarbell in the Art Gallery. In the Women's Building, she was able to view a wide range of their accomplishments, including large murals by Mary Cassatt and Mary MacMonnies.

=== Training ===
At the Columbian Exposition she also learned about the Pratt Institute, a fairly new technical school in Brooklyn, New York, and took an art aptitude test. She was accepted in the art department at Pratt in 1895 and Peterson borrowed $300 from her mother to study there. In 1901 she graduated and went on to study oil and watercolor painting at the Art Students League in New York City with Frank DuMond.

In 1907, she extended her artistic career by taking a grand tour in Europe, visiting England, Holland, France and Italy, providing an opportunity to learn from the masters.

=== Travel abroad ===
Like many young artists of her time, Peterson took several grand tours of the European continents, starting in 1907, and studied under several famous European artists, including Frank Brangwyn in Venice and London, Joaquin Sorolla in Madrid, and Jacques-Émile Blanche and André Lhote in Paris. While in Paris, Peterson also became friends with American writer Gertrude Stein and art collector and critic Leo Stein, becoming a regular at the siblings' various gatherings where the guests included Pablo Picasso and Henri Matisse. She lived in rooms in Montparnasse located around the corner from Gertrude Stein's salon, where on Saturday evening artists and art enthusiasts would gather to view and discuss Stein's seminal collection of modern art. During her time in Paris, Peterson was surrounded by Fauvism, Expressionism, Impressionism, and the beginnings of Cubism. When she first arrived in Paris in 1907 Picasso was already paving the way with innovative and experimental techniques, displaying Fauvist tendencies and going beyond them.

In 1910, Peterson travelled alone to Egypt and Algiers in North Africa – an extremely bold act for a woman in the early 20th century. In 1916 she joined Louis Comfort Tiffany for a transcontinental painting exhibition in his private railway car. Peterson traveled widely, painting from Maine to Florida and as far north as British Columbia. Her 1930’s oil painting "Florida Mangroves" is in the permanent collection of the Norton Museum of Art in West Palm Beach, Florida.

She visited Europe annually and spent six months in Turkey in 1924.

=== Professional positions ===
Shortly after graduation from Pratt in 1901, Peterson was appointed Supervisor of Drawing in Elmira, New York. In Boston, Massachusetts, she had a position as a drawing supervisor of public school teachers, and also taught at the Maryland Institute in Baltimore. In 1912, Peterson started teaching watercolor at the Art Students League and became the Drawing Supervisor of the Brooklyn Public Schools.

=== Later life ===
In 1925 at age 50, Peterson married a corporate lawyer, M. Bernard Philipp. Following her marriage, she spent summers in Ipswich, MA, and travelled less often. She had the opportunity to study and paint flowers, writing a book, Flower Painting, in 1946. A solo exhibit at the Newhouse Galleries in New York featured her floral paintings. Four years after her husband's death, she married New Haven physician James S. McCarty in 1939. Their marriage lasted for less than a year.

Peterson died on August 14, 1965, on a trip to join a niece in Kansas.

== Career ==
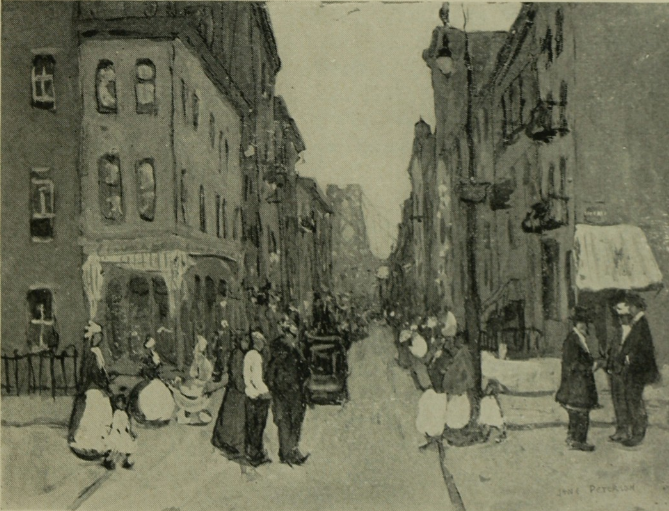
Black and white reproduction of Mott Street, New York, 1916 New York Watercolor Club Exhibition

=== Early influences ===
In 1907, she studied with the Welsh artist Frank Brangwyn in Venice and London, Joaquin Sorolla in Madrid, and painter Jacques Blanche and sculptor Andre L'Hote in Paris. Under their guidance she gained a diverse and expert knowledge of painting techniques and composition. In 1909, she went back to Europe and studied under Joaquín Sorolla y Bastida in Madrid. Of all her mentors, Sorolla had the most influence upon Peterson's style. Peterson's canvases become more daring with color, as layers of loose brushstrokes combine to represent the shimmer of summer's light in southern Europe.

it was Sorolla who persuaded Peterson to follow him to New York where he had been commissioned to do a portrait of Louis Comfort Tiffany, the founder of the Tiffany & Co. At Tiffany's invitation, Peterson joined the artistic circle at Laurelton, his summer estate in Oyster Bay, Long Island. Her trips with Tiffany inspired her work: In 1916, Peterson joined Tiffany in a painting adventure and expedition to Alaska and the Canadian Northwest.

In 1912, Peterson went back to Paris, where she associated with the members of the American Art Association which included American Impressionist Painter Frederick Carl Frieseke. Her interest in watercolor started at this time.

=== Artistic style ===
Peterson's work is hard to put into one or two single categories of art. Actually, her works are more like a blend of several most prominent styles in the turn of the 20th century under the influence of her academic artistic training of many influences in both America and across Europe: Impressionism, Neo- and Post-Impressionism, Art Nouveau, Nabi, and Fauvism. Peterson love to use loose brushwork and bold colors in her paintings. From 1910 through 1916, Peterson became increasingly linked stylistically to fellow American, Maurice Prendergast. They shared similar interests in subject matter, and both had traveled and studied in Europe. Peterson and Prendergast had comparable technical skills of astute observation and loved colorful subjects but Peterson's linear movement is more aggressively flowing than Prendergast's. Gradually, they each developed a unique style, according to Charlotte Streiffer Rubenstein.^{3}

=== Subjects of her painting ===
Peterson's paintings of people, events, and scenery reflect her travels around the globe, rather than the more conventional domestic scenes. For example, during World War One, Peterson joined the war effort painting military portraits and patriotic scenes of women rolling bandages and folding blankets at the Red Cross Center. Spending six months in Turkey in 1924, she painted streets scenes in the Islamic cities of Constantinople and Broosa. Peterson shared the stories she uncovered while traveling, and explored in her paintings the differences between the lives of others and her own life. She relished her status as an independent, female American artist seeing the world and interpreting it for other Americans.

=== Exhibitions ===
A solo exhibition of Peterson's work held in 1908 at the Société des Artistes Français won much acclaim among Parisian critics and resulted in one viewer setting up an exhibition at the St. Botolph Club in Boston in 1909 of her earlier works. She also exhibited at the Knoedler Gallery in New York City, and at Bendann's Art Gallery in Baltimore, Maryland. From 1910 to 1914 Peterson had her own exhibitions at the Art Institute of Chicago, Illinois. The 1910 exhibition included works she painted in Egypt and Algeria. She also participated in many group shows such as the American Watercolor Society and the New York Society of Painters both in New York City and the Baltimore Watercolor Club in Maryland.

== Works ==
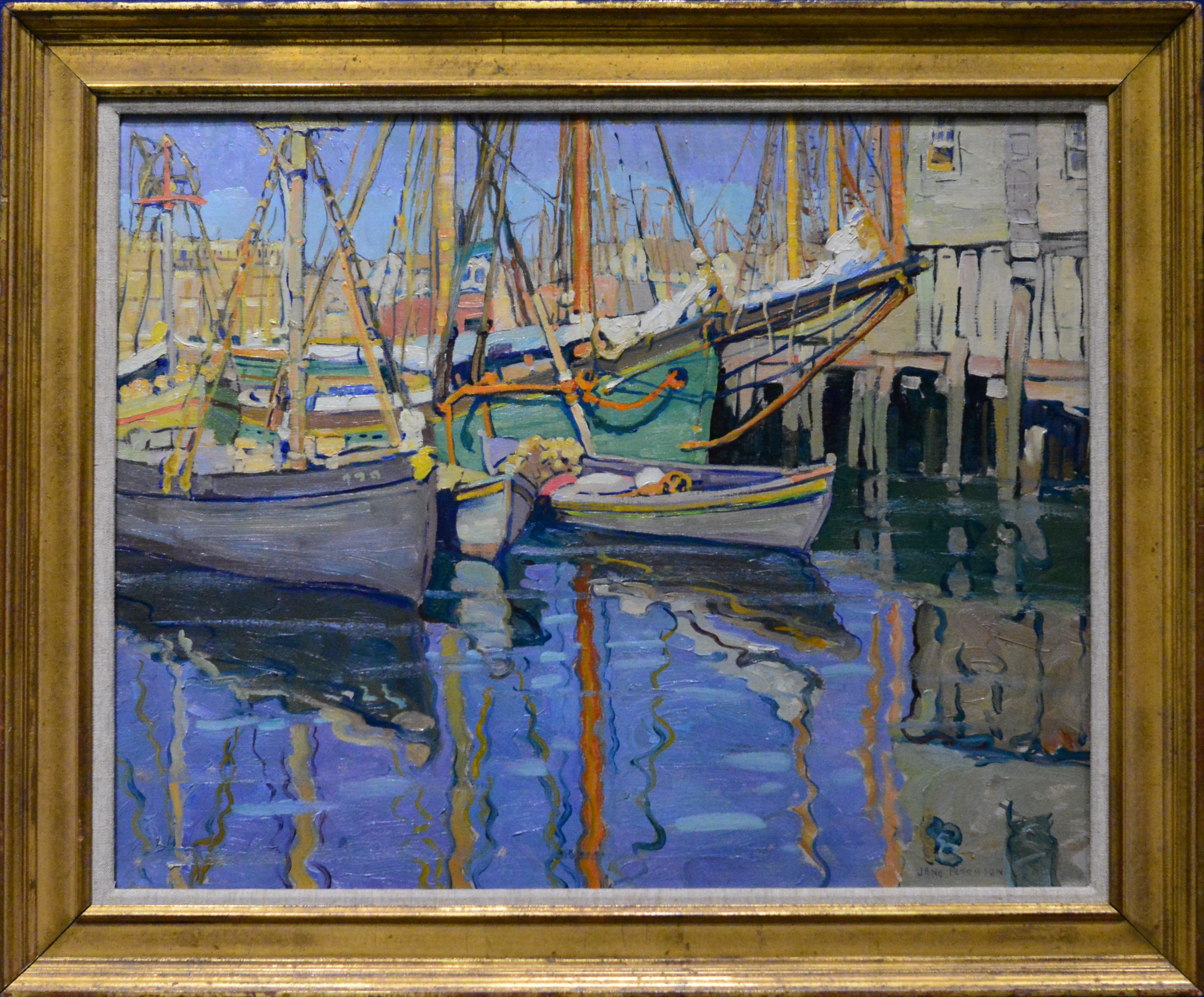
Brooklyn Museum - Fishing Boats, Gloucester - Jane Peterson - overall

Three of Peterson's works are held by the Metropolitan Museum of Art. Parade was created with gouache, watercolor, charcoal, and graphite on paper, and Turkish Fountain with Garden (from Louis C. Tiffany Estate, Oyster Bay) created with oil and charcoal on canvas, in 1910. Venetian Summer was painted in oil on canvas. Marché aux Fleurs, oil on canvas, painted while in Paris in 1908, is held in the Terra Foundation Collection. The Floats was appraised on PBS' Antiques Roadshow in October 2014. She was selected as the most outstanding individual of the year for her artistic achievement by the American Historical Society in 1938. During World War II she produced four portraits representing women in each branch of the military. These portraits were auctioned for $211,000 to build a war memorial. Her works were featured in Jane Peterson: At Home and Abroad, shown in 2018 at the Columbia Museum of Art, the Mattatuck Museum, the Long Island Museum of Art, and the Hyde Collection (Glens Falls, New York).
