= Frank Walts =

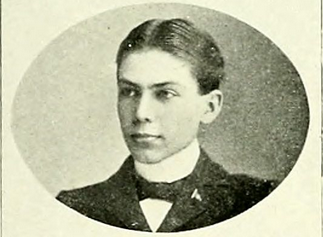
Image of Frank Matson Walts

Frank Walts (23 March, 1877, Lima Township, LaGrange County, Indiana – 21 January 1941, New York City) was an American artist who provided illustrations for several radical magazines.

Walts has been described as an exemplary modernist, particularly as regards his covers for The Masses, e.g. his illustration of Mary Fuller, April 1916. He was on the board of both The Masses and The Liberator and subsequently New Masses.

He is noted for his portrayal of African Americans for The Crisis magazine, and his work was critically discussed by such people as W. E. B. Du Bois who considered Walts "a thoughtful, clear-eyed artist" and defended him against critics.

== Gallery ==
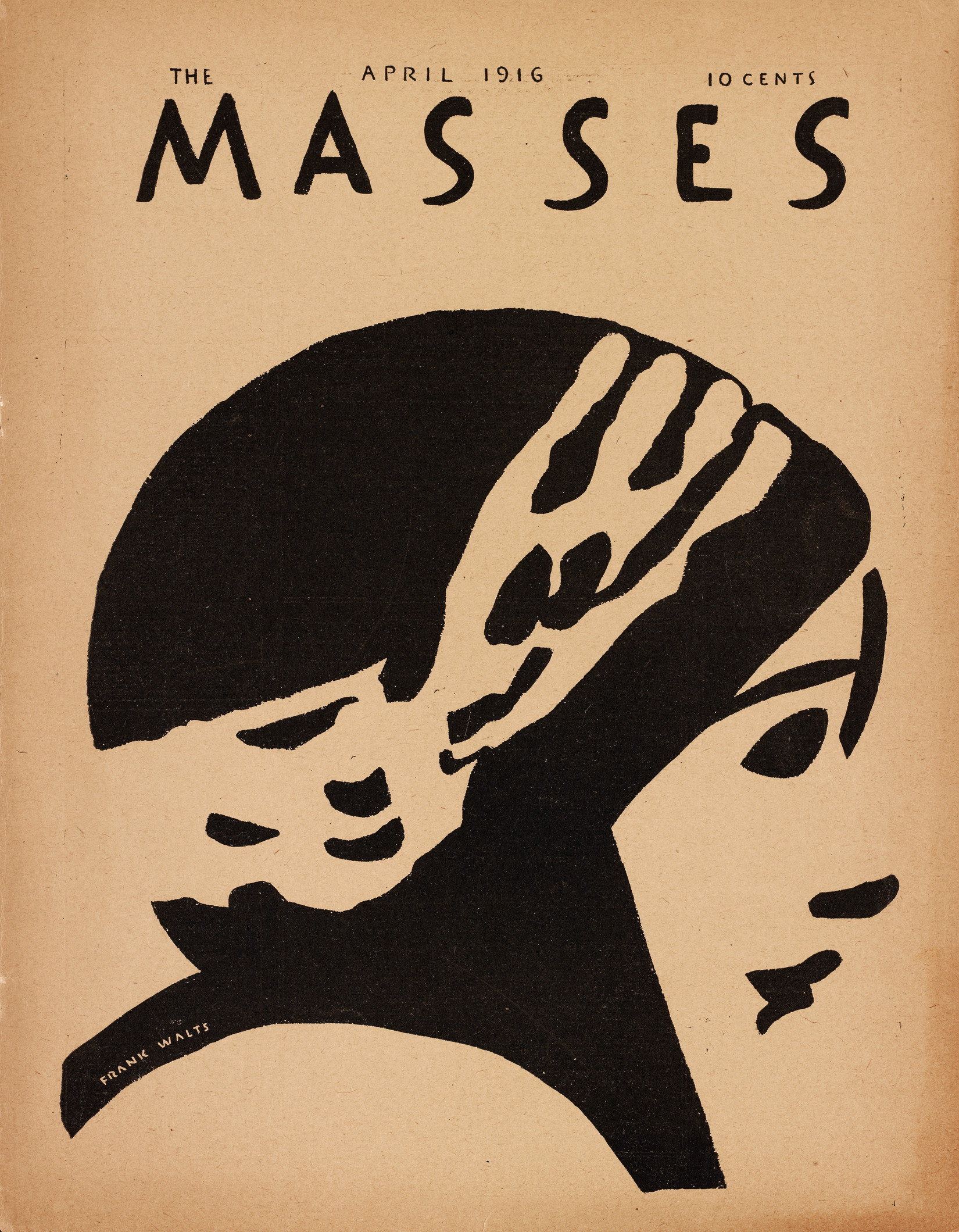
The Masses (cover), April 1916, A sketch of Mary Fuller, star of The Heart of a Mermaid (Lucius J. Henderson, 1916)

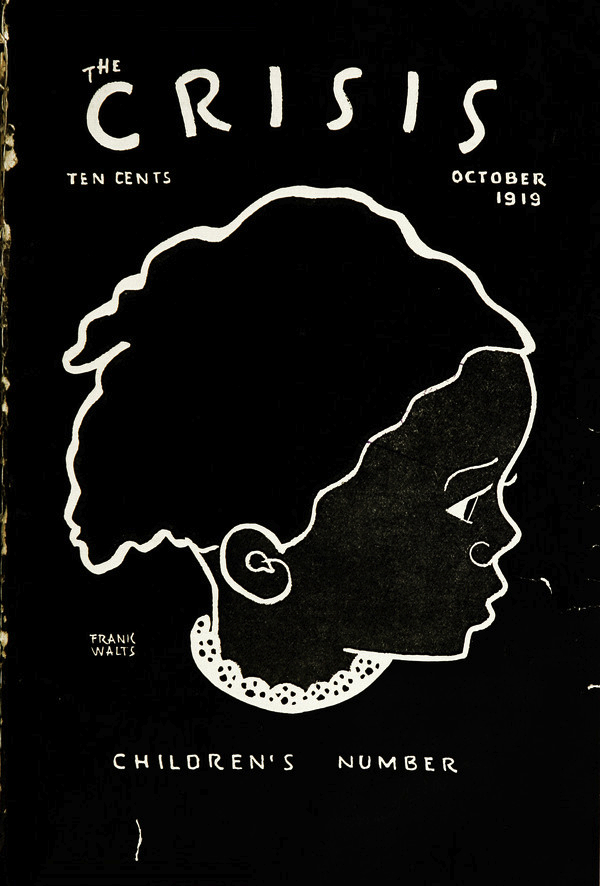
The Crisis (cover), October 1919

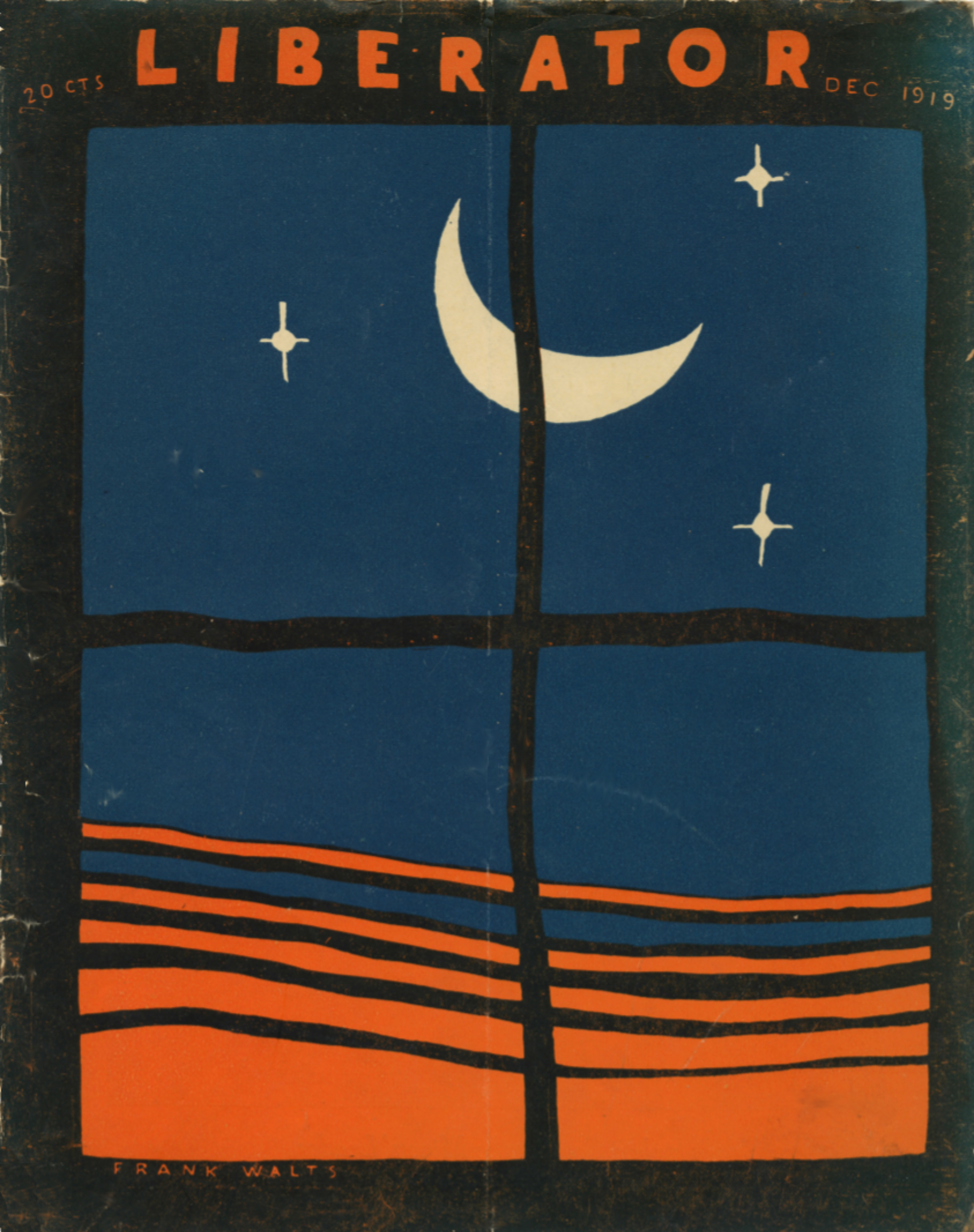
The Liberator (cover), December 1919
