= Ryan Walker (cartoonist) =

American cartoonist (1870-1932)

Ryan Walker in 1905.

Ryan Walker (December 26, 1870 in Springfield, Kentucky - June 23, 1932 in Moscow) was an American political activist and cartoonist. A prolific artist who published political cartoons in a variety of radical newspapers and magazines in the United States, Walker is best remembered as the creator of the recurring character "Henry Dubb", an American worker who ambled through life blithely being victimized by capitalism ostensibly as a result of his blind acceptance of the ideas of the ruling class.

A member of the Socialist Party of America during his younger years, Walker's political views hardened with the coming of the Great Depression in 1929 and he joined the Communist Party USA the following year, joining the editorial staff of the party's English-language daily newspaper in New York City. Walker died of pneumonia in June 1932 while on a visit to the Soviet Union.

== Biography ==
=== Early years ===
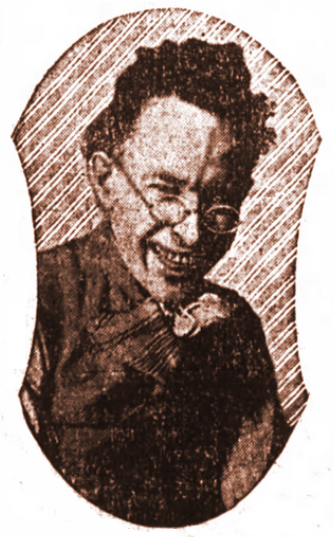
Ryan Walker as he appeared in 1900, early in his career as a cartoonist.

Ryan Walker was born in Springfield, Kentucky, on December 26, 1870. His father, Edwin Ruthwin Walker, was a farmer who later became a lawyer and moved the family to the Midwestern metropolis of Kansas City, Missouri, where Ryan attended public school.

Showing a proclivity for art from an early age, submitting his first freelance cartoons to Judge in 1883, at the age of 13. These were not of sufficiently finished quality to appear in the pages of the magazine, but the ideas were accepted and redrawn into a two-page center spread and back cover cartoon by a house artist, for which Walker received a royalty check of $15. He received positive reinforcement from the magazine's editor to continue at the cartooning craft and to hone his drawing skill.

Upon leaving school Walker studied for a time at the Art Students' League in New York City, before working for a number of years in a series of manual jobs, refining his drawing in his spare time.

Walker's private portfolio grew until in 1895 he was finally able to land his first permanent artistic job, a position in the advertising department of the Kansas City Times. He showed aptitude with a pen and took an acute interest in political issues and he was shortly made an editorial cartoonist for that paper, remaining in that position until 1898.

In 1898 he moved to St. Louis, Missouri, to take a position as cartoonist for the St. Louis Republic, where he would stay until 1901, taking time to marry his Kansas City sweetheart, journalist Maud Helena Davis, in October 1899.

The year 1901 saw a move to Boston, where he did a stint as cartoonist for The Boston Globe, leaving after one winter. He subsequently worked as a freelance cartoonist, publishing work in a variety of prominent newspapers and magazines of the day, including the New York Times,Life, The Arena, and The Bookman.

Walker moved from freelance to syndicated work in 1904, joining with the Baltimore-based International Syndicate as a cartoonist. He would stay with that firm for the better part of a decade, contributing as many as 18 drawings a week during the Presidential election of 1912. His health broke down from the strain, however, and he resigned his position as a syndicated cartoonist to pursue political pursuits full-time.

=== Socialist years ===
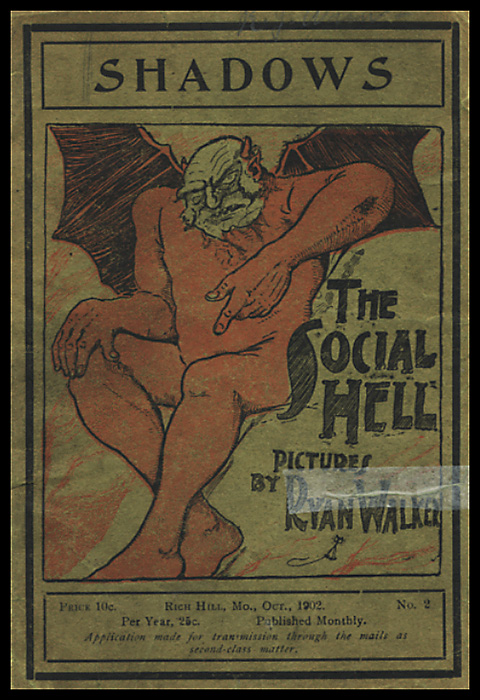
Walker's first book, a 1902 cartoon pamphlet, The Social Hell.

During his Kansas City years, Walker approached the proprietor of a new socialist weekly, the Appeal to Reason, established there in the summer of 1895 seeking employment as the paper's cartoonist. Although Julius Wayland was not able to pay Walker at the time, he nevertheless published the first few of Walker's cartoons in the pages of the Appeal .

While making his living as an artist for the mainstream press, in 1902 Walker began to contribute material to a glossy socialist monthly published in New York City during the first five years of the 20th Century, The Comrade.

Walker turned a close eye to the social problems of his day and developed politically radical views, declaring in a 1905 interview that

"My aim, hope, and life-work is the betterment of my brother man. Nothing else counts. I believe the present economic system is cruel, unjust, and essentially wrong, and wrong is wrong, no matter how it may be disguised ... I am a Socialist because I believe that Socialism will lead to the development of the greater self, to the out-blossoming of all that is finest and highest in individual life, and that it will secure for all the people a measure of prosperity, happiness, and freedom ..."

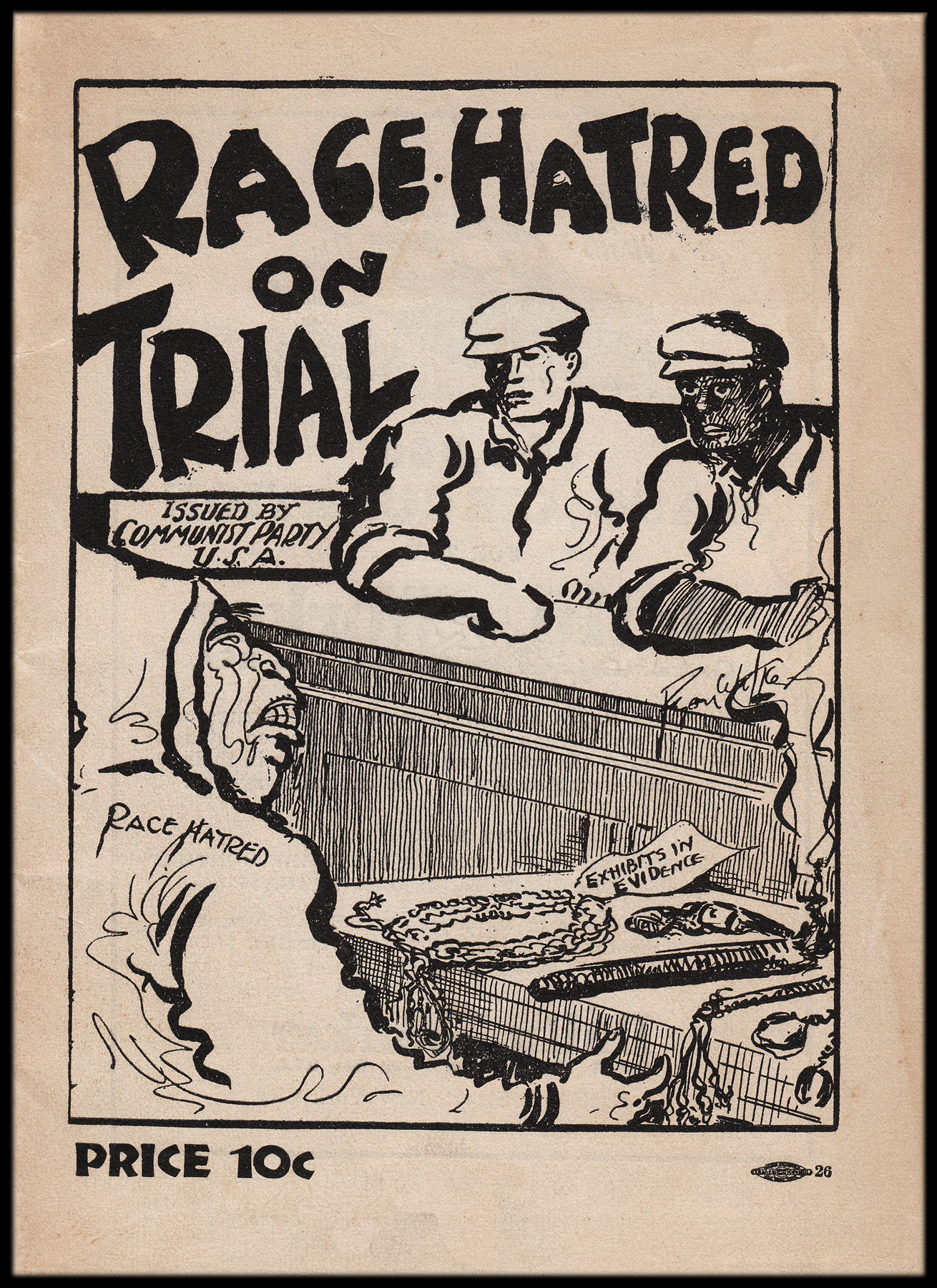
Walker contributed cover art to this 1931 Communist Party political pamphlet, Race Hatred on Trial.

It was through the pages of the socialist Appeal to Reason, a mass circulation weekly published in Southeastern Kansas to which he began regularly contributing in 1906, that Walker first gained popular fame. It was in those pages that he first introduced the character "Henry Dubb," an American worker who unthinkingly rejected the ideas of unionism and socialism, only to accept as inevitable his victimization by the violence and corruption of the social system around him. Exposed as a dupe and a fool by his worldly wife and somehow cognizant child, the oblivious and intractable protagonist would respond to his latest existential insult with an unblinking stare into space and the catchphrase "I'm Henry Dubb!" — an easy-to-understand depiction of the effects resulting from so-called false consciousness among the working class.

Walker would come to publish two collections of Henry Dubb cartoons in hard covers, Adventures of Henry Dubb (1914) and New Adventures of Henry Dubb (1915), testimony to the character's enduring appeal among American radicals during the decade of the 1910s.

In addition to a steady stream of cartoons, beginning in 1912 Walker toured the country as a stump speaker on behalf of the Socialist Party of America, Walker was effective in his role as a socialist lecturer, so much so that his abilities were lauded by party orator Eugene V. Debs, who called him "accurate and resourceful", and declared him a "great cartoonist" and "equally great" public speaker, who could delight and hold an audience of socialists and non-socialists alike. Walker was directly employed by the National Office of the Socialist Party as one of the touring speakers for its Lyceum Bureau from 1915 to 1916, working in close association with Lyceum director and future Communist Party leader L. E. Katterfeld.

In 1914, Walker participated in Upton Sinclair's picket of the Standard Oil building in New York City in the wake of the Ludlow Massacre, and — after Sinclair's arrest — led the other picketers when Mary Craig Sinclair was unable to be present.

Following a conservative turn of the editorial line of the Appeal during the years of World War I, Walker took his art and the Henry Dubb character to the pages of the New York City socialist daily New York Call and later to its successor, the New Leader. The left wing press being notoriously underfunded, Walker supplemented his socialist-related work with regular employment as the Director of the Art Department of the Evening Graphic newspaper in New York City, where he was employed from 1924 to 1929.

=== Communist years ===
In the fall of 1930 Walker joined the Communist Party USA and the John Reed Club, and assumed a position as a staff cartoonist for The Daily Worker, the party's New York City-based newspaper. In conjunction with his new role, Walker created a new regularly recurring character for his cartoons, a stolid proletarian known as Bill Worker.

=== Death and legacy ===
During a visit to the Soviet Union in the spring of 1932, Ryan Walker fell ill and was forced to be hospitalized. He died of pneumonia at Rotkinsky hospital in Moscow on June 22, 1932. He was 61 years old at the time of his death.

== Works ==
- The Social Hell. Rich Hill, MO: The Coming Nation, 1902.
- Jim and James. Girard, KS: Appeal to Reason, 1906.
- The Socialist Primer: A Book of First Lessons for the Little Ones in Words of One Syllable. (Illustrator.) Girard, KS: Appeal to Reason, 1908.
- The Red Portfolio: Cartoons for Socialism. Girard, KS: The Coming Nation, 1913.
- Adventures of Henry Dubb: Cartoons. New York: Ryan Walker, 1914.
- New Adventures of Henry Dubb: Cartoons. Chicago: Socialist Party, 1915.
