= The Masses =

American radical magazine

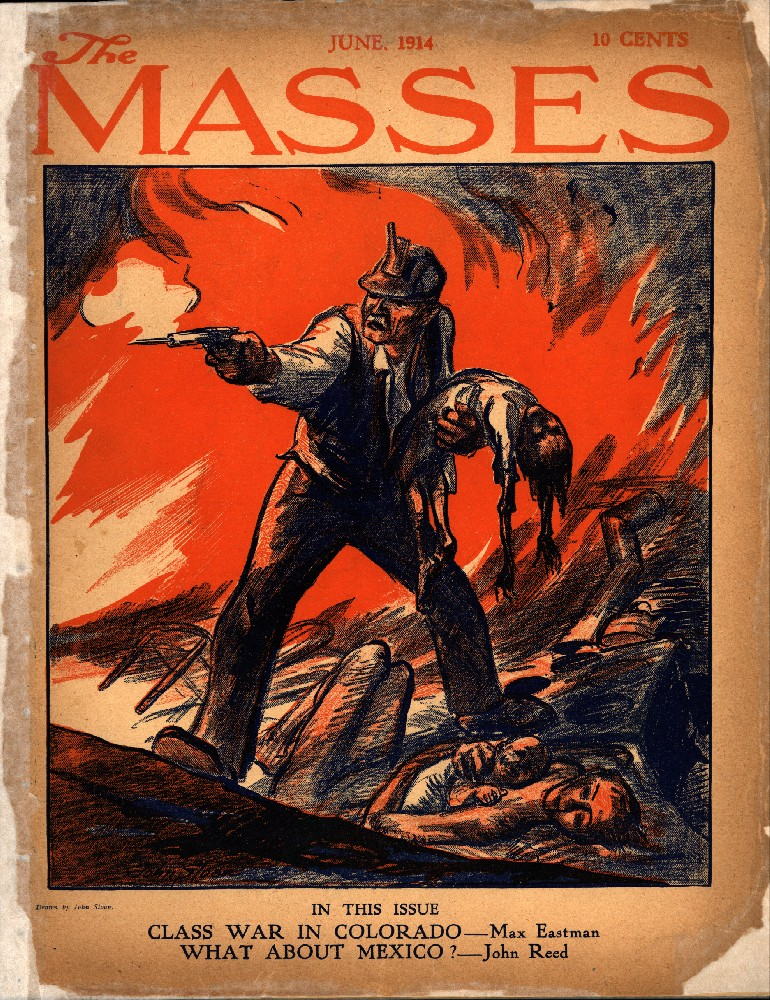
- June 1914 issue of The Masses. Cover illustration was drawn by John French Sloan and depicts the Ludlow Massacre.
- First issue: 1911
- Final issue: 1917
- Country: United States
- OCLC: 1756843

The Masses was a graphically innovative American magazine of socialist politics published monthly from 1911 until 1917, when federal prosecutors brought charges against its editors for conspiring to obstruct conscription in the United States during World War I. It was succeeded by The Liberator and then later New Masses. It published reportage, fiction, poetry and art by the leading radicals of the time such as Max Eastman, John Reed, Dorothy Day, and Floyd Dell.

== History ==
=== Beginnings ===
Piet Vlag, an eccentric Dutch socialist immigrant from the Netherlands, founded the magazine in 1911. For the first year of its publication, the printing and engraving costs of the magazine were paid for by a sympathetic patron, Rufus Weeks, a vice president at the New York Life Insurance Company. Vlag's dream of a co-operatively operated magazine never worked well, and after just a few issues, he left for Florida. His vision of an illustrated socialist monthly had, however, attracted a circle of young activists in Greenwich Village to The Masses; these included visual artists such as John French Sloan from the Ashcan School. These Greenwich Village artists and writers asked one of their own, Max Eastman (who was then studying for a doctorate under John Dewey at Columbia University), to edit their magazine. John Sloan, Art Young, Louis Untermeyer, and Inez Haynes Gillmore (among others) mailed a terse letter to Eastman in August 1912: "You are elected editor of The Masses. No pay." In the February 1913 issue of The Masses, Eastman wrote the following manifesto:

A Free Magazine—This magazine is owned and published cooperatively by its editors. It has no dividends to pay, and nobody is trying to make money out of it. A revolutionary and not a reform magazine; a magazine with a sense of humour and no respect for the respectable; frank; arrogant; impertinent; searching for true causes; a magazine directed against rigidity and dogma wherever it is found; printing what is too naked or true for a money-making press; a magazine whose final policy is to do as it pleases and conciliate nobody, not even its readers—There is a field for this publication in America. Help us to find it.

The Masses was to some extent defined by its association with New York's artistic culture. "The birth of The Masses," Eastman later wrote, "coincided with the birth of 'Greenwich Village' as a self-conscious entity, an American Bohemia or gipsy-minded Latin Quarter, but its relations with that entity were not simple." The Masses was very much embedded in a specific metropolitan milieu, unlike some other competing socialist periodicals (such as the Appeal to Reason, a populist-inflected 500,000-circulation weekly produced out of Girard, Kansas).

The magazine carved out a unique position for itself within American Left print culture. It was more open to Progressive Era reforms, like women's suffrage, than Emma Goldman's anarchist Mother Earth. At the same time it fiercely criticized more mainstream leftist publications like The New Republic for insufficient radicalism.

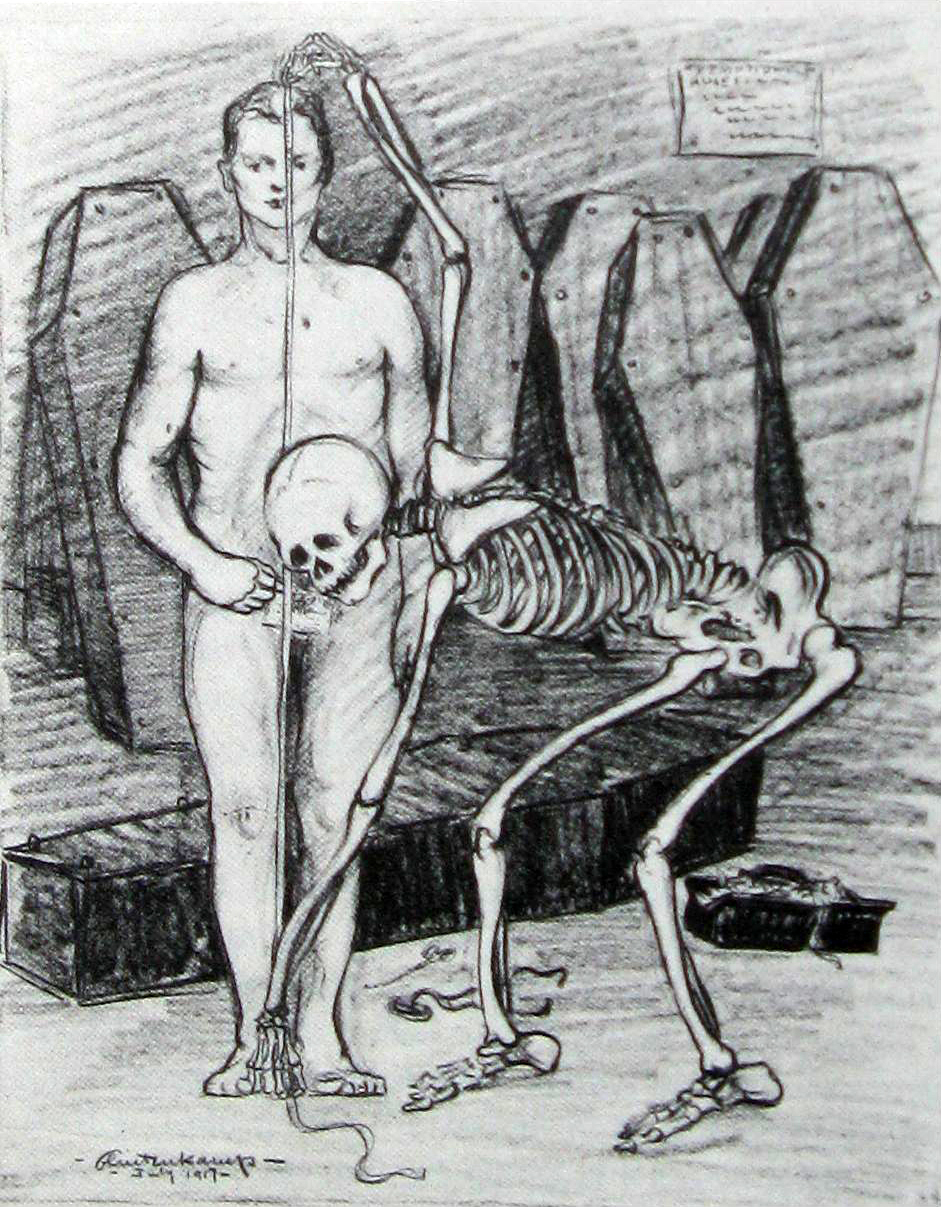
Physically Fit, a drawing by Henry J. Glintenkamp, published in the magazine in 1917, that was cited in the indictment

After Eastman assumed leadership, and especially after August 1914, the magazine's denouncements of the war were frequent and fierce. In the September 1914 edition of his column, "Knowledge and Revolution," Eastman predicted: "Probably no one will actually be the victor in this gambler's war—for we may as well call it a gambler's war. Only so can we indicate its underlying commercial causes, its futility, and yet also the tall spirit in which it is carried off."

By May 1916, the radical content published in The Masses had caused it to be boycotted by two major American magazine distribution companies, United News Co. of Philadelphia, and Magazine Distributing Co. of Boston. It was also excluded from the Canadian mails, university libraries, bookshops, and the newsstands of the New York City subway system.

=== Associated Press lawsuits ===
In July 1913, in the aftermath of the Paint Creek–Cabin Creek strike of 1912 in West Virginia, Max Eastman wrote an editorial in The Masses accusing the Associated Press of "having suppressed and colored the news of that strike in favor of the employers". Eastman detailed the AP's alleged suppression of information regarding the abuses carried out by a military tribunal set up to punish striking coal workers, and also accused the AP of having a conflict of interest, after it was discovered that the AP's local correspondent was also a member of the tribunal. The editorial was accompanied by a cartoon by Art Young, entitled "Poisoned at the Source", which featured a figure of the AP poisoning the reservoir of news with "Lies", "Suppressed Facts", "Prejudice", "Slander", and "Hatred of Labor Organization".

The AP filed suit for criminal libel against Eastman and Young through its attorney William Rand, but the suit was dismissed by a judge. Rand followed up by persuading the District Attorney in New York City to convene a Grand Jury, which indicted Eastman and Young for criminal libel in December 1913. The two editors were arrested on December 13 and released on $1,000 bail each, facing the prospect of a year in prison if found guilty. A month later, the two were also charged with personally libeling the President of the Associated Press, Frank Brett Noyes, when it was determined that the figure of the AP in Young's cartoon was in Noyes's likeness.

Young and Eastman were represented pro bono by Gilbert Roe, and their plight attracted the support of an array of activists including Lincoln Steffens, Charlotte Perkins Gilman, Inez Milholland, and Amos Pinchot. At a meeting held in support of Eastman and Young at Cooper Union, Pinchot expressed his support of their cause and agreed with the two editors' charge that the AP was operating as a monopoly "in constraint of truth". The AP demanded he retract his statement on the threat of a $150,000 libel lawsuit, but Pinchot persuaded the organization that the publicity would reflect poorly on them and the suit went nowhere. The defense consulted the lawyer Samuel Untermyer, who claimed to have personally witnessed the distortion of the West Virginia news by the AP. After two years of litigation, the District Attorney's office quietly dropped the lawsuits against Young and Eastman.

=== First trial ===
Following the passing of the Espionage Act (Pub. L. 65-24, 40 Stat. 217, enacted June 15, 1917), The Masses attempted to comply with the new regulations as to remain eligible for shipment by the U.S. Post Office. The business manager, Merrill Rogers, "made efforts to be in compliance by seeking counsel from George Creel, Chairman of the Committee on Public Post office still denied use of the mails." Challenging the injunction from the mail, The Masses found brief success in having the ban overturned; however, after bringing public attention to the issue, the government officially identified the "treasonable material" in the 1917 August issue and, shortly after, issued charges against Max Eastman, Floyd Dell, John Reed, Josephine Bell, H.J. Glintenkamp, Art Young, and Merrill Rogers. Charged with seeking to "unlawfully and willfully…obstruct the recruiting and enlistment of the United States" military, Eastman and his "conspirators" faced fines up to 10,000 dollars and twenty years imprisonment.

The trial opened April 15, 1918, and despite the onslaught of prejudicial emotions, the defendants were not very worried. The Masses cohort, aware of the prosecutory artifice, played up a lackadaisical performance of absurdist humor. "Contributing to a carnival atmosphere that first day of the trial was a band just outside the courtroom window patriotic tunes in a campaign to sell Liberty Bonds and disturbing the solemnity within the courtroom itself. Each time the band played the "Star Spangled Banner" Merrill Rogers jumped to the floor to salute the flag. Only after the fourth time that the band played the tune and only after the Judge asked him did Rogers finally dispense with the salute." Finally, only five of seven defendants even appeared for the trial – Reed was still in Russia and H.J. Glintenkamp was of unknown whereabouts, though rumored to be anywhere from South America to Idaho. Louis Untermeyer commented, "As the trial went on it was evident that the indictment was a legal subterfuge and that what was really on trial was the issue of a free press."

Before releasing the jury for deliberation, Judge Learned Hand altered the charges against the defendants and attempted to preface the jury of their constitutional duties. Hand dismissed all the charges against Josephine Bell, and dismissed the first count – "conspiracy to cause mutiny and refusal of duty"—against the remaining defendants. Prior to releasing the jurors, Judge Hand stated, "I do not have to remind you that every man has the right to have such economic, philosophic or religious opinions as seem to him best, whether they be socialist, anarchistic or atheistic." After deliberating from Thursday afternoon to Saturday, the jury returned with two decisions. First, the jury was unable to come to a unanimous decision. Secondly, and perhaps more importantly, the jurors seeking to convict the defendants blamed one juror for being unable to conform to the majority opinion, as he was also a socialist and, consequently, un-American. Not only did the other eleven jurors demand the prosecutor to levy charges against the lone juror, but moved to drag the socialist supporter out into the street and lynch him. Judge Hand, given the uproar, declared a mistrial.

=== Second trial ===
In September 1918, The Masses were back on trial, this time joined by John Reed (who had smuggled himself back into the United States from Russia in order to be present at the trial). Aside from new defense attorneys, the proceedings remained very similar to the first trial.

Ending his closing arguments, Prosecutor Barnes invoked the image of a dead soldier in France, stating, "He lies dead, and he died for you and he died for me. He died for Max Eastman. He died for John Reed. He died for Merrill Rogers. His voice is but one of a thousand silent voices that demand that these men be punished." Art Young, who had taken to sleeping through most of the court proceedings, awoke at the end of Barnes's argument, whispering loudly, "What? Didn't he die for me?" John Reed, sitting next to Young responded, "Cheer up Art, Jesus died for you." As before, the jury returned unable to come to a unanimous decision (though without threats of violence).

After The Masses died, Eastman and other writers were unwilling to let its spirit go with it. In March 1918, their new monthly adopted the name of William Lloyd Garrison's famed The Liberator.

The Masses continued to serve as an example for radicals long after it was suppressed. "The only magazine I know which bears a certain resemblance to (Dwight Macdonald's magazine) Politics and fulfilled a similar function thirty years earlier," Hannah Arendt claimed in 1968, was "the old Masses (1911–1917)."

=== Notable contributors ===
- Sherwood Anderson
- Cornelia Barns
- George Bellows
- Louise Bryant
- George Creel
- Arthur B. Davies
- Dorothy Day
- Floyd Dell
- Max Eastman
- Wanda Gág
- Helen Rose Hull
- Jack London
- Amy Lowell
- Mabel Dodge Luhan
- Inez Milholland
- Robert Minor
- Pablo Picasso
- John Reed
- Boardman Robinson
- Carl Sandburg
- John French Sloan
- Upton Sinclair
- Louis Untermeyer
- Mary Heaton Vorse
- Art Young

== Politics ==
=== Labor struggles ===
The magazine reported on most of the major labor struggles of its day: from the Paint Creek–Cabin Creek strike of 1912 in West Virginia to the 1913 Paterson silk strike and the Ludlow Massacre in Colorado. It strongly sympathized with Big Bill Haywood and his IWW, the political campaigns of Eugene V. Debs, and a variety of other socialist and anarchist figures. The Masses also indignantly followed the aftermath of the Los Angeles Times bombing.

=== Women's rights and sexual equality ===
The magazine vigorously argued for birth control (supporting activists like Margaret Sanger) and women's suffrage. Several of its Greenwich Village contributors, like Reed and Dell, practiced free love in their spare time and promoted it (sometimes in veiled terms) in their pieces. Support for these social reforms was sometimes controversial within Marxist circles at the time; some argued that they were distractions from a more proper political goal, class revolution. Emma Goldman once tutted: "It is rather disappointing to find THE MASSES devoting an entire edition to 'Votes for Women.' Perhaps Mother Earth alone has any faith in women ... that women are capable and are ready to fight for freedom and revolution."

=== Literature and criticism ===
American realism was a vital, pioneering current in the writing of the time, and several leading lights were willing to contribute work to the magazine without pay. The name most associated with the magazine is Sherwood Anderson. Anderson was "discovered" by The Masses' fiction editor, Floyd Dell, and his pieces there formed the foundation for his Winesburg, Ohio stories. In the November 1916 The Masses, Dell described his surprise years before while reading Anderson's unsolicited manuscript: "there Sherwood Anderson was writing like—I had no other phrase to express it—like a great novelist." Anderson would later be cited by the Partisan Review circle as one of the first homegrown American talents.

The magazine's criticism, edited by Floyd Dell, was cheekily titled (at least for a time) "Books that Are Interesting." Dell's perceptive reviews gave accolades to many of the most notable books of the time: An Economic Interpretation of the Constitution, Spoon River Anthology, Theodore Dreiser's novels, Carl Jung's Psychology of the Unconscious, G. K. Chesterton's works, Jack London's memoirs, and many other prominent creations.

== Illustrations ==
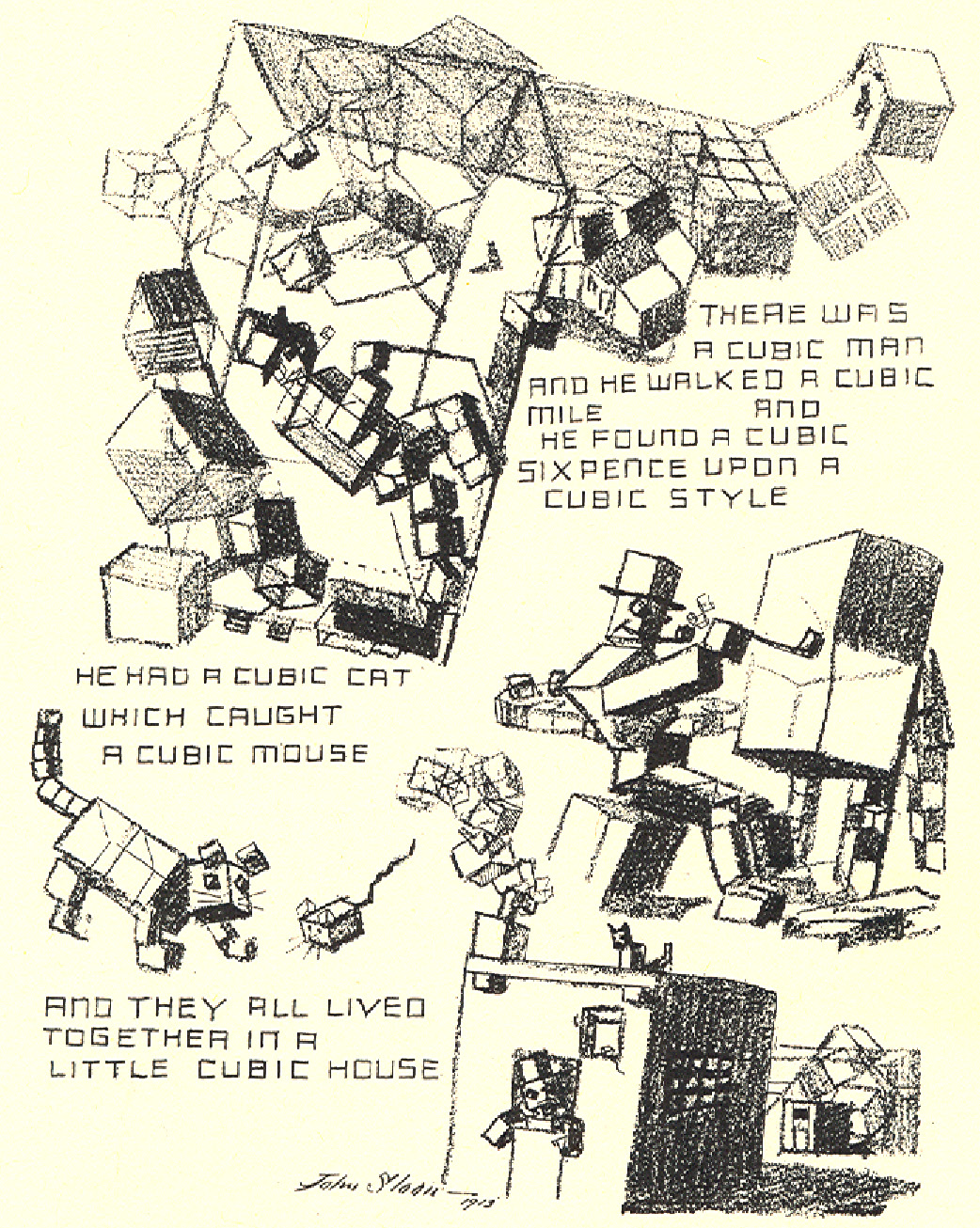
John French Sloan's satirical take on the Armory Show, captioned "A Slight Attack of Third Dimentia Brought on by Excessive Study of the Much-Talked of Cubist Pictures in the International Exhibition at New York."

Although the magazine's birth coincided with the explosion of modernism, and its contributor Arthur B. Davies was an organizer of the Armory Show, The Masses published for the most part realist artwork that would later be classified in the Ashcan School. Art Young, who served on the editorial board for the full run of the magazine, is credited with first using the term "ash can art" in 1916. These artists were attempting to record real life and create honest pictures, and they would often use the crayon technique to do so. This technique resulted in "capturing the feeling of a rapid sketch made on the spot and permitting a direct, unmediated response to what they saw" and is commonly found on the pages of The Masses from 1912 to 1916. This type of illustration became less common after the artists' strike in 1916, which ended with many artists leaving the magazine. The strike occurred when Max Eastman began to assert more influence over what was published and began printing material without first submitting it to the editorial board for a vote. While the majority of the editorial board backed up Eastman, some of the staff questioned "what they saw as Eastman's attempts to turn The Masses into a 'one-man magazine instead of a cooperative sheet.'" One of the main issues the artists took up during the strike was that Eastman and Floyd Dell were appending many illustrations with captions without the approval or knowledge of the artists. This particularly irritated John Sloan who saw the magazine as moving away from its original purpose and stated, "The Masses is no longer the resultant of the ideas and art of a number of personalities. The Masses has developed a 'policy.'" Not agreeing with this idea of a policy, which became more and more serious with the escalation of World War I, Sloan and other artists (including Maurice Becker, Alice Beach Winter, and Charles Winter) resigned from the magazine in 1916.

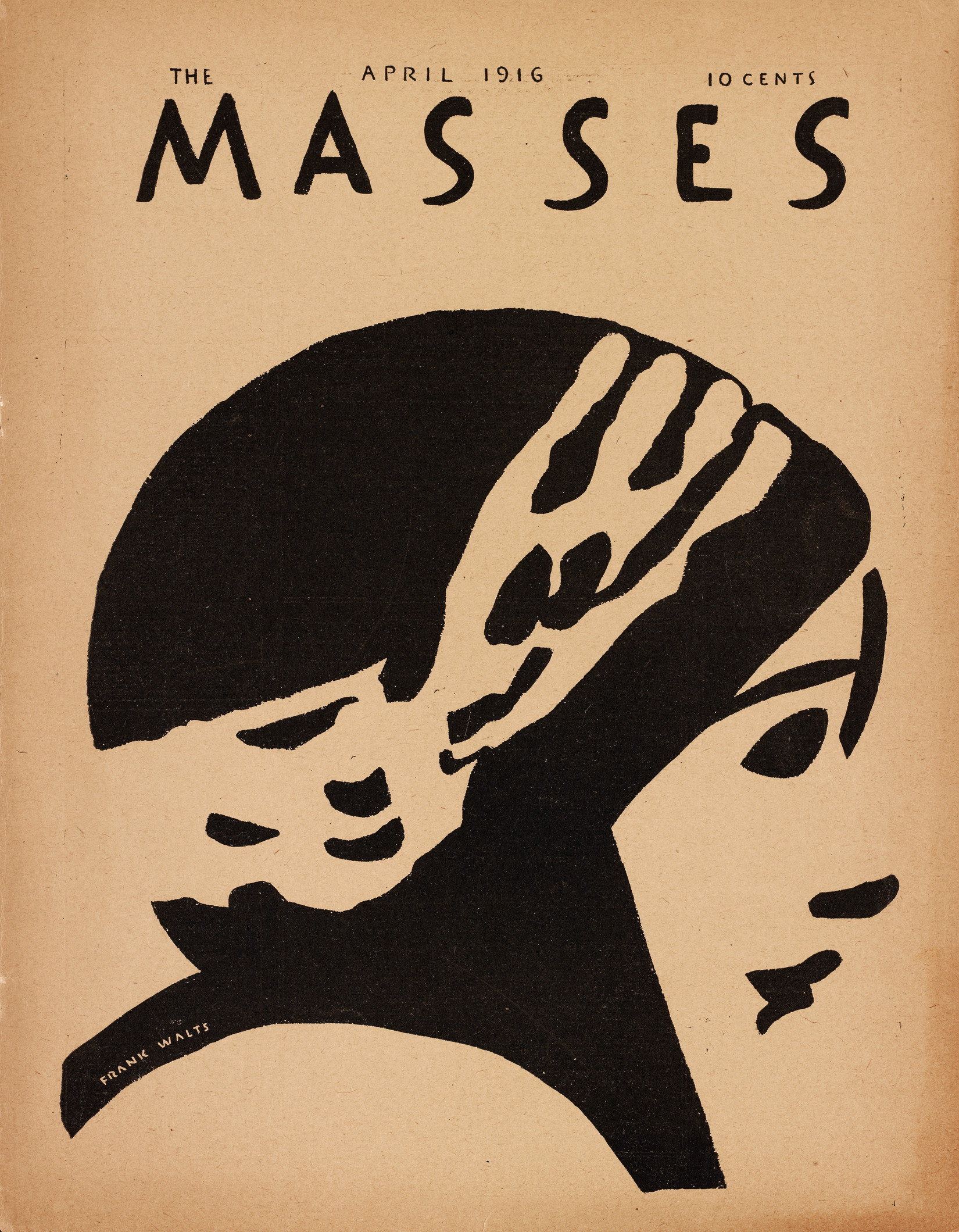
The Masses (cover), April 1916, A sketch by Frank Walts of Mary Fuller, star of The Heart of a Mermaid (Lucius J. Henderson, 1916)

During the later years of its publication, the magazine embraced more modernist art than before, although it never dropped realist illustrations completely. Several of the cover issues from 1916 and 1917 attest to this shift. Instead of featuring crayon drawings of realistic scenes with gentle social satire, they featured cover girls often clad in modern attire and embodying a modernist style. Frank Walts' picture of Mary Fuller has been given as an example of this.

In addition to the realistic and modernist artwork, the magazine was also well known for its many political cartoons. Art Young is perhaps most famous for these; but other artists, such as Robert Minor, also contributed to this aspect of the magazine. The cartoons, especially those by Young and Minor, were at times quite controversial and, after the United States entered World War I, considered treasonous for their anti-war sentiments.

The illustrations published often pushed the socialist agenda for which The Masses was known. John Sloan's drawings of the working class and immigrants, for example, advocated for labor rights; Alice Beach Winter's work was known to emphasized motherhood and the plight of working children; and Maurice Becker's city life scenes satirized the extravagant lifestyle of the upper class. While many of the illustrations in The Masses made a political or social point, Max Eastman did frequently publish art for its aesthetic value and wanted the magazine to be a publication, which combined revolutionary ideas with both literature and art for its own sake.

== See also ==
- Christian anarchism
- Christian pacifism
- Masses Publishing Co. v. Patten
