= William Henry Chamberlin =

American historian and journalist (1897–1969)

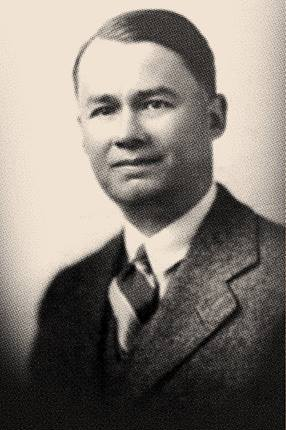
- Born: February 17, 1897; Brooklyn, New York
- Died: September 12, 1969 (aged 72); St. Moritz, Switzerland
- Occupation: Writer
- Writing career
- Genres: Journalism, History, Current affairs
- Notable work: The Russian Revolution (1935)

William Henry Chamberlin (February 17, 1897 – September 12, 1969) was an American historian and journalist. He was the author of several books about the Cold War, communism, and foreign policy, including The Russian Revolution 1917-1921 (1935), which was written in Russia between 1922 and 1934 while he was the Moscow correspondent of The Christian Science Monitor.

An opponent of communism from the early 1930s, Chamberlin predicted that intervention in World War II would help communism in Europe and in Asia, which led him to be a non-interventionist.

== Biography ==
=== Early life and education ===
Chamberlin was born in Brooklyn on February 17, 1897. He was an only child, the son of Ernest Chamberlin, a newspaperman of modest means. His ethnicity was an amalgam of English and Scottish, with lesser genealogical connection to Germany and France, with a paternal grandfather who had fought as a volunteer in the 81st Ohio Infantry Regiment of the Union Army in the American Civil War.

Chamberlin attended Camden High School in Camden, New Jersey (a suburb of Philadelphia) for two years, a miserable period which he later recalled as a "heterogeneous mass of badly taught subjects" with "complete indiscipline among the students." He was a baseball fan during his boyhood years, regularly attending games of both the Philadelphia Phillies and Philadelphia Athletics, but found his chief source of diversion in books, including both the fiction of Mark Twain and heavier historical fare.

He described his father, a regular Socialist voter, as an important left-wing influence on his political views. Chamberlin remained decidedly mild in his progressive tendencies, strongly supporting Theodore Roosevelt and his Bull Moose campaign in 1912 rather than the substantially more radical politics of Eugene V. Debs. Horace Traubel, a socialist and biographer of Walt Whitman, was a family friend.

As a junior in high school, Chamberlin transferred to the Penn Charter School in Philadelphia, which he recalled in 1940 as being one of the two "most fortunate accidents in his life." (Note: The other being his landing of a job as the Moscow correspondent of the Christian Science Monitor.) This event "extricated me from an educational blind alley and opened the way for six years of congenial study along classical lines, accompanied by unsystematic but extensive outside reading," Chamberlin recalled.

Chamberlin's attendance at Penn Charter, a Quaker-affiliated school, "led up naturally" to enrollment at Haverford College, another Quaker institution, located "in a pleasant suburban district of Philadelphia," he indicated. Chamberlin found the small liberal arts college with its ivy-clad dormatories and student body of 200 to be highly suited for his tastes, and he spent four happy years there, graduating in 1917.

=== Journalistic career ===
Upon graduating, Chamberlin found himself well educated but with "uncommonly poor preparation for making a living" — well versed in Greek and Latin, German philosophy, and French and Russian literature, but with no readily marketable skills other than the ability to operate a typewriter and to construct sentences in coherent English. New York City, with its well-stocked libraries and rich cultural possibilities, "loomed up as a sort of Mecca of my hopes," Chamberlin later recalled. His mother, May McClintock Chamberlin, the daughter of a lawyer, hoped he would continue his education to pursue that career, but "law had never impressed my imagination," Chamberlin wrote, and so he, after a process of elimination, "drifted into newspaper work."

He landed his first job in the summer of 1917, earning $15 a week as a reporter for the Philadelphia Public Ledger, but quickly found the job and its endless loop of police stations, war rallies, and banquets to be "extremely boring." From there he moved to the Philadelphia Press for a more interesting stint as the assistant editor of the paper's weekly magazine section.

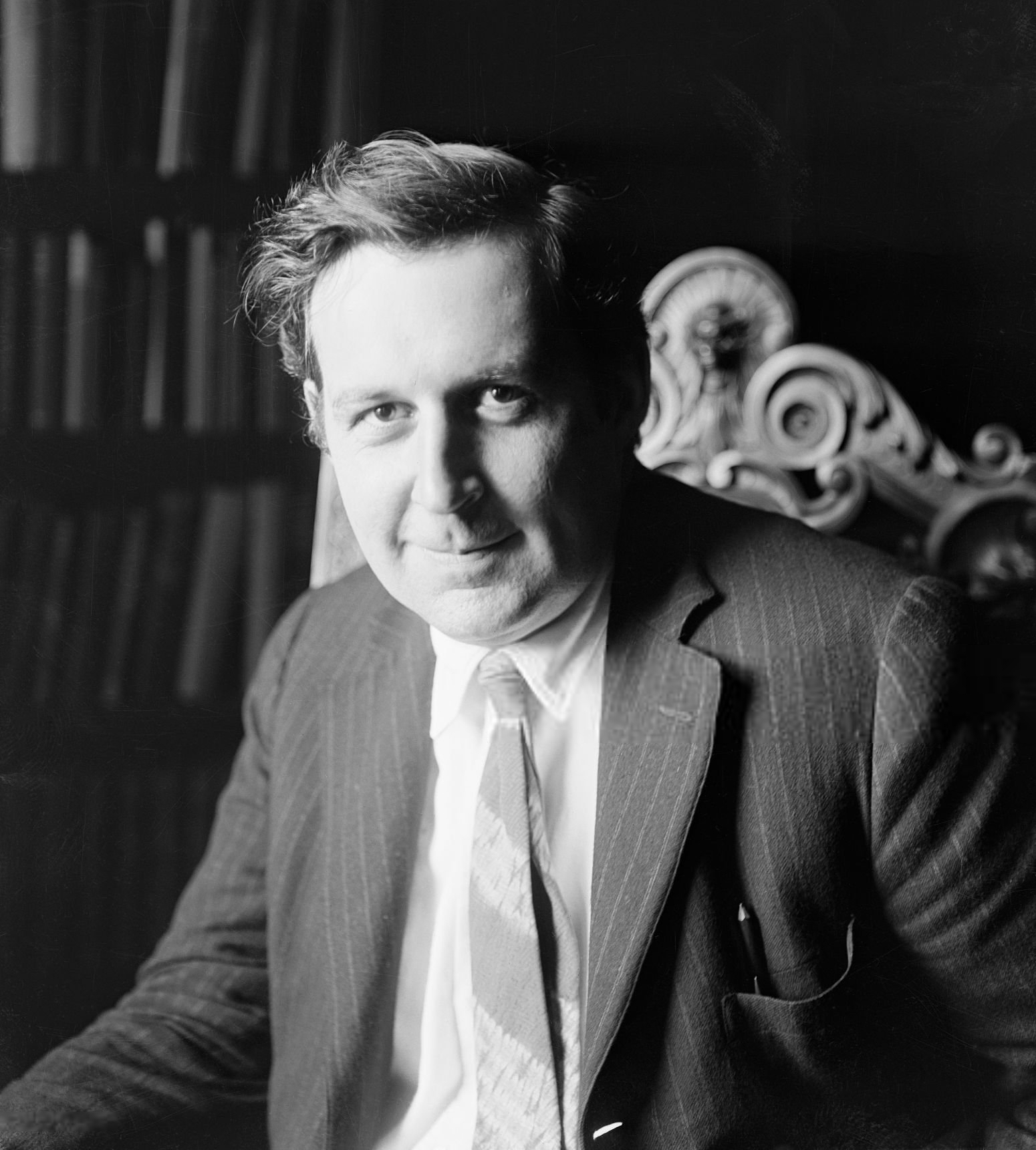
Heywood Broun, book editor of the New York Tribune, with whom Chamberlin worked. Broun, a committed social activist, later gained prominence as a syndicated columnist.

Chamberlin had absorbed the pacifist message of Quakerism and was an unwavering opponent of World War I, which America had entered early in 1917 and he was in touch with other former students at Haverford to rally support for an anti-war group called the Collegiate Anti-Militarism League, as well as another, later revealed to have been started by a government agent, called The Young Democracy. His number was pulled in the second draft and Chamberlin later indicated that he had considered a demonstrative suicide rather than face induction, even obtaining a handgun for the purpose. Fortunately, the anticipated mid-1918 call up did not happen on schedule. By the time his induction notice came, it was clear to him that with the war coming to a close, the worst he would face was apt to be a couple months in training camps, so he sold his gun and packed his bags.

The war came to a close while Chamberlin was at training camp and he was discharged. His newspaper job in Philadelphia having been filled, he made his way to his Mecca, New York City, to find work there. He landed in Greenwich Village, where he beat the bushes without success trying to land a job at one of the many radical publications in the city, making a few dollars as a freelance book reviewer for the New York Tribune. He lived frugally, tapping savings squirreled away from his time at the Philadelphia Press.

It was at this time that he met Sonya Trostem, a native of Elizavetgrad (today's Kropyvnytskyi), a small city in central Ukraine. The pair would marry in 1920 and be partners for life. He was finally hired to a permanent position at the Tribune, initially writing headlines before becoming assistant book reviews editor unter the tutelage of book editor Heywood Broun. He also contributed to the liberal magazine The Dial and to the Sunday magazine section of the socialist weekly New York Call during this interval, making use of the pseudonym "A.C. Freeman." He also made the acquaintance of various pro-Bolshevik figures in the New York scene of that day, including journalist John Reed, pioneer Lenin biographer Albert Rhys Williams, novelist Floyd Dell, and Alexander Gumberg, secretary to Raymond Robins.

Chamberlin's double life as Tribune book reviewer and radical writer "A.C. Freeman" came to a close in 1921, when his job at the Tribune was collateral damange of budget cuts associated with the post-war recession that swept the country. The job loss spurred the adventurous Chamberlin to attempt another change of venue. Chamberlin and his wife tapped into their meager savings to travel to Soviet Russia, financing their own passage with the promise from several under-financed left wing publications to accept stories from the revolutionary country, although the money promised was necessarily minor owing to the poverty of the radical press. Immediately prior to departure, however, The Christian Science Monitor put their own name in the hat, committing to accept occasional freelance articles from Moscow. This association would ultimately prove fruitful.

=== Moscow reporter ===
Chamberlin, "a newspaperman of academic temper," arrived in the Soviet Union in 1922 as a reporter for the Christian Science Monitor. Chamberlain's dispatches were always "exact and scholarly and passionless," Eugene Lyons of United Press later recalled, adding the high praise that Chamberlin was the "best-informed and least sensational of my American colleagues in Moscow." (Note: Lyons arrived in Moscow with his wife and child on February 8, 1928, remaining for six years. See: Lyons, Assignment in Utopia, p. 56.) With the exception of a short period in 1927, when he reported for the Monitor on the scene in China, Chamberlin would remain in the Soviet Union and work for that publication until March 1934. He also acted as Moscow correspondent for the Manchester Guardian.

One of Chamberlin's most vivid memories of his experience as a newspaper reporter on the Moscow beat was sitting in the audience of the Hall of Trade Unions in the fall of 1922 where he heard V.I. Lenin address the 4th World Congress of the Communist International:

"He seemed positively ill at ease when the delegates greeted him with a tremendous ovation. He struck no poses, shuffled papers, clearly eager to get on with the business at hand. As a compliment to the audience, he delivered his address not in Russian but in German, in which he was fairly fluent, although he occasionally paused and asked help for a word that would convey his meaning more adequately. A stocky man of medium height and athletic build...he spoke without oratorical flourishes; the whole effect was that of a professor giving a lecture rather than of a fiery tribune trying to kindle the flame of world revolution."

At the end of his Russian years, Chamberlin reminisced about his early opinion of the Soviet regime, which he characterized as "more than friendly; it was enthusiastic." Proceeding from his belief that World War I had been "the supreme crime and folly of the century," Chamberlin recalled having "jumped to the conclusion, which I have long abandoned, that revolution on the Bolshevik model is a panacea for war and for all social injustice."

=== Books of the early 1930s ===
Chamberlin is best remembered in the 21st Century as a pioneer historian and interpreter of the Russian Revolution and the rapid and brutal economic and social changes taking place in the Soviet Union during the tumultuous decade of the 1930s.

Dust jacket from Chamberlin's first book, Soviet Russia (1930).

His first book, Soviet Russia: A Living Record and a History, with an introduction datelined from Moscow on September 15, 1929, detailed the history of the country through the end of the New Economic Policy, on the eve of collectivization and the radical industrialization program of the Five-year plan. It was retrospectively reckoned to be "on the whole a fairly well-balanced account" of ongoing events in the controversial revolutionary country, "certainly more sober and objective than the contemporary accounts of his colleagues in Moscow."

Chamberlin acknowledge the book would neither satisfy "those extreme partisans in opposed controversial camps who regard Bolshevism as either the greatest calamity or the greatest blessing which ever befell mankind," but hoped instead to be of service to those "who feel that an honest effort at understanding is a more useful form of approach to the complicated problem of the Russian Revolution than the rhetorical exercises in eulogy and denunciation."

For the revised edition Chamberlin made a trip in the summer of 1930 to collective farms of the Lower Volga region, where he observed the aftermath of "dekulakization," in which about 5 percent of peasant homestads in the area had been expropriated.

While many were sent to a grim fate in the forest regions of the climactically brutal far north, others were consigned to so-called "kulak nests — "wretched settlements on unfruitful land outside the village limits. Chamberlin's darkening view of the Soviet regime became clear in his report of what he saw at one suck "kulak nest" in the Nikolaevka district of the Lower Volga that he visited:

"The men had been conscripted for work in a neighboring state farm and I found only women and children, living in dugouts which could afford little protection when cold weather came on. By selling a few personal possessions which had been left to them, by grubbing in the fields for grain which the members of the collective farm failed to reap, and by cultivating a little melon patch, they had contrived to remain alive; but their future seemed dark and doubtful. Even worse was the fate of those who were driven from their homes in the cold winter months and sent off to Northern regions... For any Communist or local Soviet official to have expressed sympathy with these kulaki or to have regarded them not as an abstract class to be liquidated, but as human beings, would have been treason."

In March 1934, Chamberlin received a new journalistic assignment, ending more than a decade spent reporting from Moscow.

Chamberlin's criticism of Stalin's Soviet Union became unmistakable in October 1934, when his third book, Russia's Iron Age, saw print, including extended extracts reprinted from his diary. In addition to passing along reports about the soviet secrety police using prisoners for slave labor in the forrests of Karelia and Northwestern Russia, Chamberlin charged that a form of exploitative compulsory labor had been imposed upon the free population, according to which orders were received from higher authorities how much timber must be cut, with this in turn proportionally assigned to various families in the area. "Those who failed to carry out the allotted task were liable to fine or imprisonment," Chamberlin noted, with labor paid for "in rubles which have shrunk in purchasing power quite as much in Karelia as in other parts of the Soviet Union."

Russia's Iron Age (Oct. 1934) chronicled contemporary affairs after the achievements and gargantuan human costs of collectivization and the first Five-year Plan had become evident.

Supplementing these observations from a visit to Soviet Karelia were notes compiled by Chamberlin from his "long-withheld and reluctantly granted" trip to the North Caucasus and Ukraine in October 1933 to investigate reports of mass famine in the region the winter and spring of the previous year.

"What we found was little short of the worst we had heard, and certainly explains the extraordinary action of the Soviet authorities in forbidding, over a period of several months, all travel in the famine regions by foreign correspondents. Everywhere a death rate that ranged remarkably close aroiund the average figure of 10 percent, according to the testimony of responsible local officials. Stories of whole families that had died off, leaving one or two survivors. Stories of cannibalism. A dreary, poverty-stricken, miserable population, shaking with malaria, in the once-fertile Kuban Valley, now overgrown by a thick crop of weeds."

At the time of his parting he still professed "sincerest respect" for some of the achievements of the bloody revolution, including the spread of mass education; the effective policy against racial and national discrimination; the promotion of health, recreation, and childcare; and for giving labor a place of honor in the national dialog as well as targeted social benefits. Moreover, Chamberlin acknowledged the reasonability of industrialization as a goal for the Soviet Union, even if not agreeing with the extreme methods of its devotees.

Against this, and outweighing this, Chamberlin provided a laundry list of crimes and violations of human dignity, including a "permanent and odious system of terrorism and espionage;" decimation of the intelligentsia through arrests, show trials, and banishing; degradation of civil liberties; a "miliitary feudal exploitation" of the peasantry resulting in the climactic great famine of 1932–33; the brutal deportation of kulaks to the Arctic, and other cruelties delivered "not from sheer wanton selfishness, but from perverted, fanatical idealism.

=== The Russian Revolution (1935) ===
With his time inside the Soviet Union as a newspaper correspondent at an end, Chamberlin set about publishing his magnum opus — a richly sourced two-volume history of the Russian Revolution covering the years 1917 to 1921. Chamberlin had worked on the book continuously from his arrival in 1922 until his departure in 1934, drawing upon a vast array of books, pamphlets, and newspapers — communist and non-communist — in writing the book.

Chamberlin noted:

"From the time when I arrived in Moscow in 1922 I conceived the idea of composing a narrative of the Bolshevik Revolution and of the period of civil war which followed it. With the constant and devoted cooperation of my wife, who read through endless files of newspapers and historical magazines relating to the period under discussion, I commenced to burrow into the vast stock of source material contained in histories, memoirs, newspapers, historical magazines, and archive materials."

While Chamberlin's research time was necessarily limited by his daily tasks as a working journalist in Moscow, the effort was aided mightily by an 18-month fellowship received from the John Simon Guggenheim Foundation, which allowed him to suspend his journalistic activities and work on the writing of the history during 1933 and 1934.

Chamberlin chose as his starting point the February Revolution of the spring of 1917, during which the tsarist regime fell to a spontaneous revolt, to the introduction of the New Economic Policy in March 1921, which, in his view "represented the beginning of an entirely new phase in Russian social and economic development." Chamberlin noted his arrival in Russia from abroad for the first time at the immediate conclusion of this time period placed him in a better position to "achieve an attitude of objective detachment" than a partisan in the conflict, and that his having been able to speak personally with some of the leading participants on both sides hopefully lent a "somewhat more living quality to the narrative."

A new edition of The Russian Revolution was put into print in 1952, with no changes deemed necessary to be made to the text by Chamberlin, owing to the stilting of original inquiry by "the special and unusual conditions which govern research by Russian or foreign historical scholars" in the USSR. "A prolonged political purge which led to the execution of many of the most eminent figures in the first ten years of the Soviet regime has played havoc with Soviet Russian historiography," he elaborated.

This editorial decision was not a matter of any great debate among Russian area specialists of the day, with Dartmouth historian Dimitri von Mohrenschildt reckoning the book to be "still by far the best account of the great Russian Upheaval in any language" some 17 years after original publication.

Chamberlin credited a more relaxed Soviet censorship in the 1920s for enabling him to locate and work with books and pamphlets by Trotsky and many "lesser communist heretics" — sources which had been swept out of bookstores and libraries and locked up in inaccessible archives by the draconian censorship of the 1930s and after.

While Chamberlin's work has been subsequently supplemented or supplanted by the efforts of three generations of specialists on Russia and the Soviet Union in the more than seven decades years since the death of Stalin, tribute to the quality and lasting value of Chamberlin's 1935 work was paid in 1987 with the release of a new edition by Princeton University Press.

=== Books of the late 1930s ===
In 1937, following a short stint as a reporter in Nazi Germany, Chamberlin published a book positing an affinity between fascism and communism — both in opposition to the principles of individual liberty and democracy. In this work, Collectivism: A False Utopia, (Note: UK title: A False Utopia: Collectivism in Theory and Practice.) Chamberlin argued that the forms of governance and social control practiced by Hitler and Stalin had created a sort of psychological equivalency between the two countries:

"Now Berlin, like Moscow, is ruled by a curious combination of mass enthusiasm and individual fear. Huge parades and demonstrations seem to attest to the strength and popularity of the existing regimes. But in Germany, as in Russia, the individual, unless he is completely identified with the ruling group, prefers not to discuss politics, looks around with apprehension if he is talking in a public place, not infrequently is definitely indisposed to meet a foreigner."

Chamberlin detailed a long list of fundamental similarities between the fascist and communist systems, including government by a single party, severe repression of dissident political organizations, a sense of fanatical enthusiasm among members of the carefully delimited ruling party, emergence of an infallible and ominipotent leader who exercises personal rule, mobilization of youth as a fundamental pillar of social support, exaltation of manual laborers, implacable anti-intellectualism, pervasive propaganda, intensive agitation against internal and external enemies, and unlimited repression by a secret police apparatus. Differences between the social systems listed by Chamberlin include private versus state ownership, religious tolerance versus official atheism, and extreme nationalism versus a historical commitment to internationalism, albeit attenuated.

Although placing the social systems of fascism and communism in closer proximity to each other than to Western democracy, Chamberlin nevertheless saw one as worse than the other:

"Of the three revolutions, the Russian has been the most far-reaching and the most destructive. Communism has uprooted more people, violently changed the course of more lives than either facism or national socialism.... Lenin and Stalin are responsible for vastly more executions and sentences of imprisonment and banishment than are Mussolini and Hitler."

Chamberlin was subsequently posted by the Christian Science Monitor to East Asia, and he wrote Japan Over Asia, which was based on what he learned there about Japanese militarism. He was transferred to France.

After returning to the US, he continued to write both scholarly books and more popular articles. His The Confessions of an Individualist was an autobiography that was published in 1940.

=== Wartime writing ===
During the first half of the 1940s, Chamberlin worked steadily as a writer, publishing one full-length book a year from 1941 to 1947.

He reprised the title of his well-known 1934 book, Russia's Iron Age, with The World's Iron Age, completed in July 1941. The book was characterized as a "long and carefully written" work, "strong with the author's own indignation, alive with his practical observations" on the 1939–40 interval of cooperative aggression between Nazi Germany and Stalin's Soviet Union. The eruption of the new European war was depicted as a "war against steel against gold," foreshadowing an ominous "Iron Age" for the civilized world, one reviewer observed.

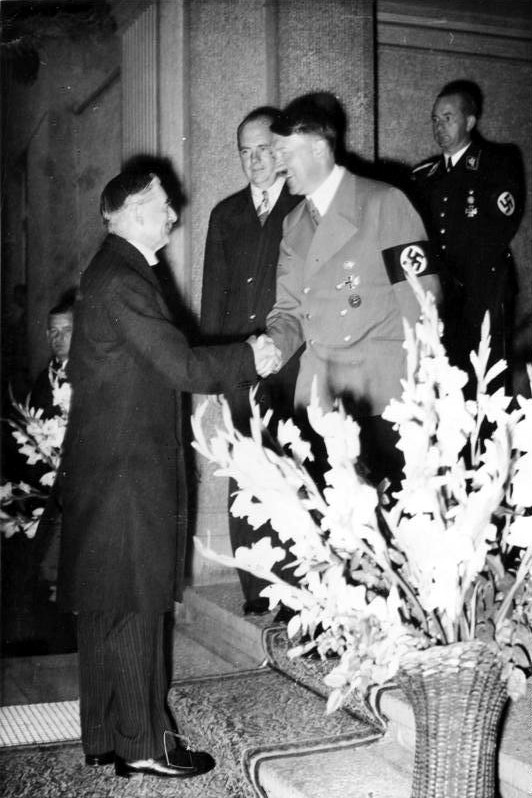
The 1938 Munich Agreement, an attempt to appease Hitler by allowing him free rein in Czechoslovakia is regarded as a turning point of European history.

Chamberlin was criticized by a second reviewer of the same work for soft-selling fascism in relation to communism as "a milder form of rule" yielding a "more disciplined" country," in the case of Italy, as well as a "rigorous system" with "compensations in the form of security" with respect to Germany. The Munich Agreement of 1938, freeing Hitler to conquer democratic Czechoslovakia, was characterized by Chamberlin as "clear-headed realism," while entry into the war on behalf of Poland scorned as a "crowning blunder," the Political Science Quarterly reviewer observed. Chamberlin advocated isolationism for America rather than entry into another "crusading war," in essence leaving Eastern Europe to the tender mercies of Germany, in anticipation of an eventual invasion of the Soviet Union, the reviewer noted. (Note: Chamberlin embraced the "isolationist" tag, defending the concept at chapter length in his 1959 second memoir. See: The Evolution of a Conservative, Chapter 12, "What Became of Isolationism?" pp. 181–193.)

Chamberlin's next literary effort, written after American entry into the war in December 1941 and released in October 1942, proved a confusing digression. Canada, Today and Tomorrow, was a thoroughly researched "know your ally" book written to inform an American public about their geographic neighbor to the north. "It is notable for its penetrating analysis of the French-Canadian problem," observed one reviewer. Although well-received critically as a carefully-constructed, statistic-laden exposition, Chamberlin's choice of topic given the epic news of the day relating to Japan and the USSR, countries about which he was regarded as a subject expert, retrospectively seems puzzling.

The book the public might have expected in 1942 finally appeared the following year — The Russian Enigma: An Interpretation, released by a new publisher, Charles Scribner's Sons. This particular book title, Chamberlin was quick to share, was a riff upon Winston Churchill's famous aphorism that Russian policy was "a riddle wrapped in an mystery inside an enigma."

In an introduction signed August 15, 1943, Chamberlin reminded readers of his previous career as a journalist in Moscow and declared he held "no ambitious political or propagandist goal in view." Instead, Chamberlin indicated that he had returned to research of recent Soviet newspapers and magazines to produce "an essay in the interpretation of a great power and a great revolution." The Russian Engima reviewed the history, politics, and economics of the Soviet Union, dedicating chapter-length coverage to the various nationalities comprising the USSR, the history of the revolution, Marxist ideology, Joseph Stalin's biography, the Great Terror of 1937–38, and Soviet foreign policy with a view to explaining the Soviet Union's durabiility during the extreme pressures of the ongoing World War.

In 1944 Chamberlin published The Ukraine: A Submerged Nation, illuminating the situation faced by one of the USSR's subject nationalities.

Chamberlin's final book of the war was written in 1945 before V-E Day but not published until 1946. In this work, World Order or Chaos, Chamberlin dealt with the international political situation in the aftermath of the war, observing that "huge power vacuums are in prospect in Europe and in East Asia with the prospect of division of spheres of influence between the two main power centers, Great Britain and the USSR. Chamberlin posed questions rather than attempted to guess answers:

"Historians of the future will perhaps be surprised at our persistent error in evaluating the war as first of all a struggle between Germany and Great Britain. Since June 22, 1941, it has rather been a gigantic duel between Hitler and Stalin for the mastery of Eurasia. Stalin, with the all-out support of the United States and Great Britain, has won this duel. What use he will make of the victory, in Europe and in Asia, is one of the largest question marks of the future world settlement."

=== The Russian Review ===
Early in 1941, Alexis Wiren and Russian emigre Dimitri von Mohrenschildt decided, over lunch in New York City, that there was a need for a new journal providing sound information about Russia, tapping into the emigrant community for much of its content. The pair received encouragement from several prominent Russian historians and moved forward with their project, a semi-annual journal called The Russian Review. William Henry Chamberlin was the first choice to serve as general editor of the magazine and he was approached and accepted, so long as the mundane and time-consuming tasks of production were done by someone else. Von Mohrenschildt agreed to take on the job, and thus a partnership was launched.

In Chamberlin's first editorial introducing the magazine, Chamberlin announced the plan to present material illuminating the history, politics, economics, and culture of Russia in a manner which allowed contributors "full freedom of expression, while at the same time avoiding propaganda, from either the left or the right." The Russian Review soon emerged as one of the leading academic journals in the field of Russian Area Studies, it's content running the gamut from history and politics to economics and sociology to literature. Chamberlin remained in the editorial seat until 1947, when he decided to step aside due to increasing dissension among the publication's readers over his increasingly conservative political views.

In addition to his general editorial tasks, Chamberlin was a frequent contributor of material to The Russian Review, often taking the form of a lead editorial on contemporary affairs. He would write occasionally for the publication for the rest of his life.

=== Conservative polemics ===
With the end of World War II, the map of Europe was remade. Stalin's Soviet Union and its national communist adherents refused to relenquish control or attaining single-party power in a swath of nations, including Albania, Bulgaria, Czechoslovakia, East Germany, Hungary, North Korea, North Vietnam, Poland, Romania, and Yugoslavia. Nor were the Baltic countries overrun during the period of the Nazi–Soviet Pact — Estonia, Latvia, and Lithuania — allowed an opportunity to democratically determine their future, absorbed instead into the Soviet Union. Communist revolution in China in 1949 and the eruption of the Korean War in 1950 further added to geopolitical instability and a sense of foreboding and angst in Western Europe and North America. A Cold War between communist and non-communist countries had erupted.

Already long having abandoned the radical political sympathies of his youth through the grim realities exposed by 12 years of intimate connection with the Soviet Union, William Henry Chamberlin's politics moved unabashedly to the right during the post-war period.

One of Chamberlin's early projects of the post-war period, a documents collection called Blueprint for World Conquest: As Outlined by the Communist International, was published by Human Events, a new conservative periodical which Chamberlin had helped to establish along with Felix Morley, Frank Hanighen, and Henry Regnery in 1944.

=== Death and legacy ===
On September 12, 1969, just 9 months after his wife's death, Chamberlin succumbed to a stroke while hiking in St. Moritz, Switzerland. He was 72 years old at the time of his death.

Chamberlin's own words introducing his 1940 autobiography make as fitting a summary of his life as any:

"The author has been an immature but earnest freethinker in a conservative Quaker college, a classicist in a mechanical age, a pacifist during the World War, a sympathizer with bolshevism when this very imperfectly understood word was utterly anathema. Then, as a result of long residence in Russia, he became a relentless critic of communist theory and practice just when these were becoming the fashionable shrine for intellectuals to worship at. Always opposed to communism and fascism as the two wings of a revolt against liberty and individualist civilization, he has been and is firmly imposed (sic.) to American intervention in Europe's infernal cycle of war and revolution.

"These attitudes will be approved or disapproved according to one's personal predelictions. But to have held them all indicates a certain freedom from group and clique influence."

Chamberlin's papers are housed ad Providence College in Providence, Rhode Island.

== Works ==
=== Books and pamphlets ===
- Soviet Russia: A Living Record and a History. Boston: Little, Brown & Co., 1930. Revised second edition, 1931.
- The Soviet Planned Economic Order. Boston: World Peace Foundation, 1931.
- Russia's Iron Age. Boston: Little, Brown & Co., 1934.
- The Russian Revolution 1917-1921 In two volumes. New York: Macmillan, 1935.
- Collectivism: A False Utopia. New York: Macmillan, 1937.
- Japan Over Asia. London: Duckworth, 1938.
- The Confessions of an Individualist. New York: Macmillan, 1940. (Memoir.)
- The World's Iron Age. New York: Macmillan, 1941.
- Canada, Today and Tomorrow. Boston: Little, Brown & Co., 1942.
- The Russian Enigma: An Interpretation. New York: Charles Scribner's Sons, 1943.
- The Ukraine: A Submerged Nation. New York: Macmillan, 1944.
- A Durable Peace in Europe. New York: New York Commission on a Just and Durable Peace, 1944.
- America: Partner in World Rule. New York: Vanguard Press, 1945.
- World Order or Chaos. New York: Vanguard Press, 1946.
- Blueprint for World Conquest: As Outlined by the Communist International. (Introduction.) Washington, DC: Human Events, 1946.
- The European Cockpit. New York: Macmillan, 1947.
- Soviet Communism: The Record of Aggression. New York: Catholic Information Society, n.d. [c. 1947].
- Stalin's Worldwide Fifth Column. New York: Catholic Information Society, n.d. [c. 1947].
- America's Second Crusade. Chicago: Henry Regnery Co., 1950.
- The Evolution of a Conservative. Chicago: Regnery, 1959. (Memoir.)
- Appeasement: Road to War. New York: Rolton House, 1962.
- The German Phoenix. New York: Duell, Sloan, and Pearce, 1963.
- Beyond Containment. Chicago: Regnery, 1983. (Posthumous.)

=== Selected articles ===
- "Making the Collective Man in Soviet Russia," Foreign Affairs, vol. 10, no. 2 (Jan. 1932), pp. 280–292.
- "The Ordeal of the Russian Peasantry," Foreign Affairs, vol. 12, no. 3 (April 1934), pp. 495–507.
- "The Evolution of Soviet Terrorism," Foreign Affairs, vol. 13, no. 1 (Oct. 1934), pp. 113–121.
- "Japan at War," Foreign Affairs, vol. 17, no. 3 (April 1939), pp. 477–488.
- "The Soviet-German War: Results and Prospects," Russian Review, vol. 1, No. 2 (April 1942), pp. 3–9.
- "Russia after the War," Russian Review, vol. 3, no. 2 (Spring 1944), pp. 3–9.
- "Russia and Europe, 1918-1944," Russian Review, vol. 4, no. 1 (Autumn 1944), pp. 3–9.
- "American-Soviet Relations Since Yalta," Russian Review, vol. 8, no. 2 (April 1949), pp. 95–101.
- "Soviet Communism: The Transient and the Permanent," Russian Review, vol. 10, no. 3 (July 1951), pp. 169–175.
- "Ten Fallacies about Communism," Russian Review, vol. 12, no. 3 (July 1953), pp. 139–152.
- "The Ordeal of the Russian Peasantry," Russian Review, vol. 14, no. 4 (Oct. 1955), pp. 295–300.
- "Forty Years of Soviet Communism," Russian Review, vol. 17, no. 1 (Jan. 1958), pp. 3–10.
- "The Jacobin Ancestry of Soviet Communism," Russian Review, vol. 17, no. 4 (Oct. 1958), pp. 251–257.
- "Khrushchev's War with Stalin's Ghost," Russian Review, vol. 21, no. 1 (Jan. 1962), pp. 3–10.
- "Russian Recollections," Russian Review, vol. 21, no. 4 (Oct. 1962), pp. 333–347.
- "The Great Divide: Freedom of Choice," Russian Review, vol. 23, no. 1 (Jan. 1964), pp. 18–24.
- "The Trend after Khrushchev: Immobilism," Russian Review, vol. 25, no. 1 (Jan. 1966), pp. 3–9.
- "The Short Life of Russian Liberalism," Russian Review, vol. 26, no. 2 (April 1967), pp. 144–152.
