= Boardman Robinson =

Canadian-born American artist (1876–1952)

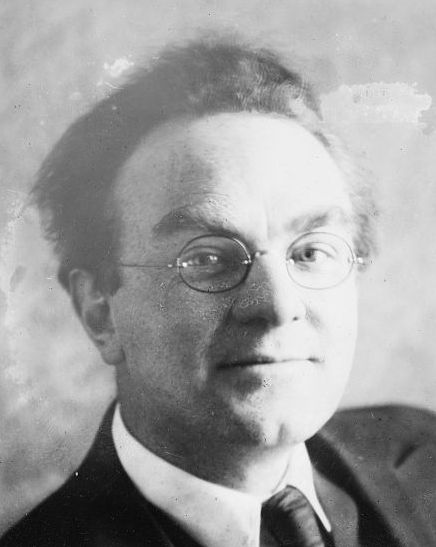
- Robinson, c. 1910–1915
- Born: Boardman Michael Robinson; September 6, 1876; Nova Scotia, Canada
- Died: September 5, 1952 (aged 75); Stamford, Connecticut, United States
- Education: Massachusetts College of Art, Académie Colarossi, École des Beaux-Arts
- Occupations: Artist, illustrator and cartoonist
- Spouse: Sarah Senter Whitney

Boardman "Mike" Michael Robinson (1876–1952) was a Canadian-born American painter, illustrator and cartoonist.

== Biography ==
=== Early years ===
Boardman Robinson was born September 6, 1876, in Nova Scotia. He spent his childhood in England and Canada, before moving to Boston in the first half of the 1890s. Robinson worked his way through normal school, following a program to learn mechanical drafting.

Robinson first studied art at the Massachusetts College of Art (now Massachusetts College of Art and Design) in Boston. He subsequently studied at the Académie Colarossi and the École des Beaux-Arts, both in Paris, where he was influenced by the political cartooning of Honoré Daumier, as well as Forain and Steinlen.

In 1903, Robinson married Sarah Senter Whitney. The couple moved to Paris where Robinson briefly worked as art editor for Vogue, before returning to the United States in 1904.

=== Career ===
Upon returning to the United States, Robinson worked as an illustrator, drawing cartoons and theater illustrations for the New York Morning Telegraph. He freelanced for a wide range of other popular publications, including Pearson's Magazine, Scribner's Magazine, Collier's, Harper's Weekly, and others.

In 1910, Robinson took a job on the staff of the New York Tribune drawing editorial cartoons, a position which he retained for four years. With the eruption of World War I in 1914, Robinson's increasingly radical anti-militarist political views brought him into conflict with his employer and he quit the publication.

Great Codifiers of the Law (Papinian, Solon and Justinian). The Robert F. Kennedy Department of Justice Building (Great Hall), Washington, (1937)

On 3 March 1915, Boardman Robinson of New York naturalized as a citizen of United States of America.

In 1915, Robinson traveled to east Europe on behalf of Metropolitan Magazine along with journalist John Reed. The pair saw first hand the effects of the European war in Russia, Serbia, Macedonia and Greece. In 1916 Reed's account of the journey was collected in a book called The War in Eastern Europe, to which Robinson contributed illustrations.

On his return from Europe, Robinson worked at the socialist monthly The Masses. His highly political cartoons as well as the general anti-war stance of The Masses was deemed to have violated the recently passed Espionage Act of 1917, and The Masses had to cease publication. Robinson, along with the other defendants were acquitted on October 5, 1918. Following The Masses, Robinson became a contributing editor to The Liberator and The New Masses, working with former Masses editor Max Eastman.

Robinson would later go on to teach art at the Art Students League in New York City (1919–30) and head the Colorado Springs Fine Arts Center (1936–47). Some of his students include Duard Marshall, James Brooks, Bill Tytla, Edmund Duffy, Jacob Burck, Russel Wright, Eric Bransby, Rifka Angel, Mary Anne Bransby, Gerhard Bakker, Bernard Arnest, and Esther Shemitz (who married Whittaker Chambers): both Burck and Shemitz contributed illustrations to The New Masses as did their mentor.)

Robinson is also known as a muralist. Some of his mural commissions include works at Rockefeller Center and the Department of Justice Building in Washington, D.C., and a nine-panel mural on the History of Trade for Kaufmann's flagship department store in Pittsburgh completed in 1929.

Robinson also illustrated several books, among them editions of Walt Whitman's Leaves of Grass (1921), Dostoyevsky's The Brothers Karamazov (1933), Edgar Lee Masters' Spoon River Anthology (1941), and Herman Melville's Moby Dick (1942).

=== Death and legacy ===
Robinson died on September 5, 1952, in Stamford, Connecticut.

== Gallery ==
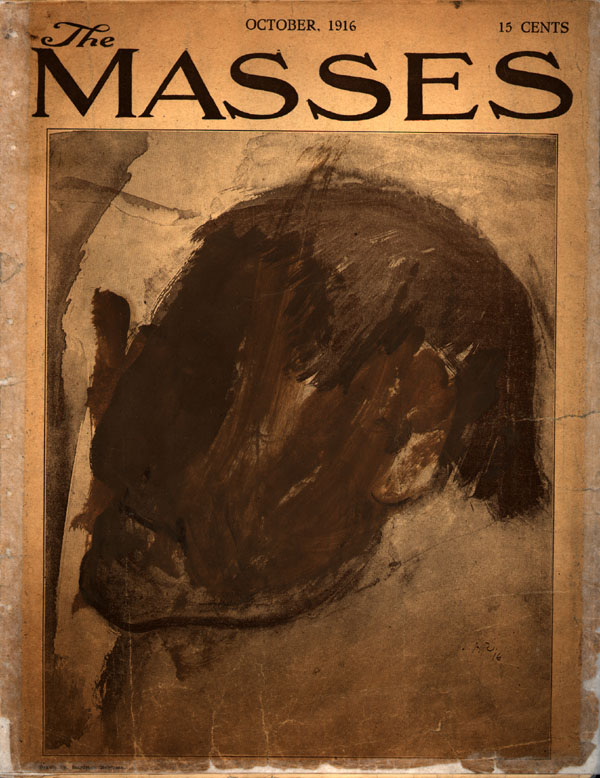
Cover illustration for The Masses, October 1916

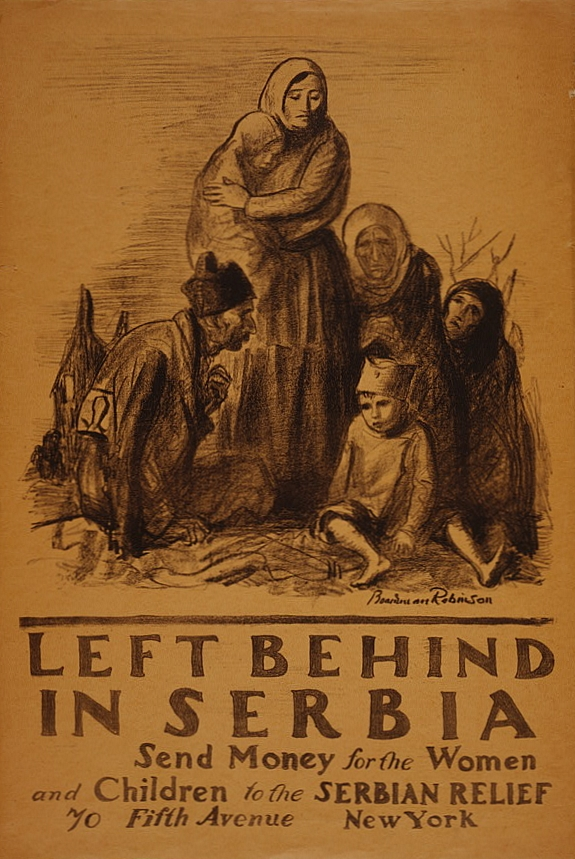
Left behind in Serbia, 1918

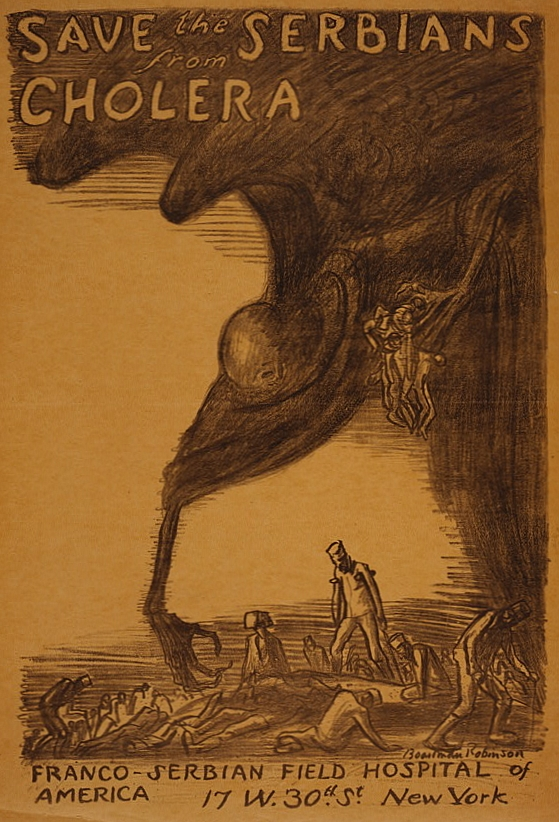
Save the Serbians from cholera, 1918

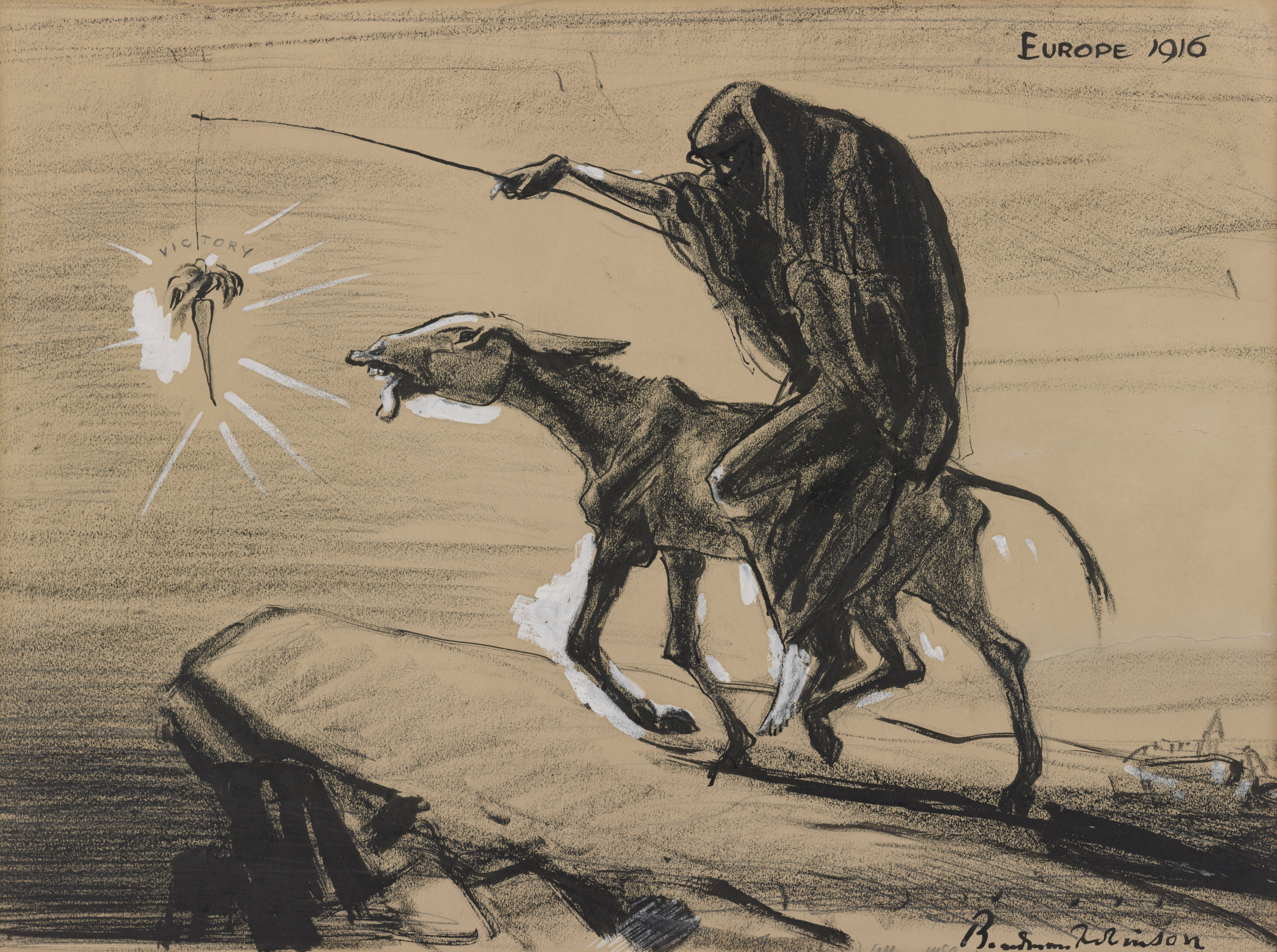
Europe 1916, October 1916

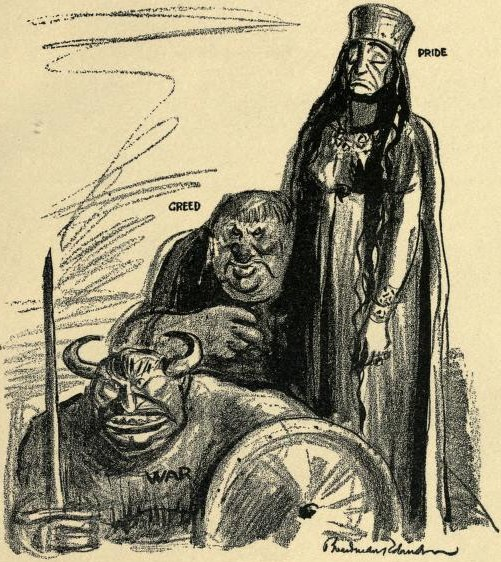
The Father and Mother, circa 1915

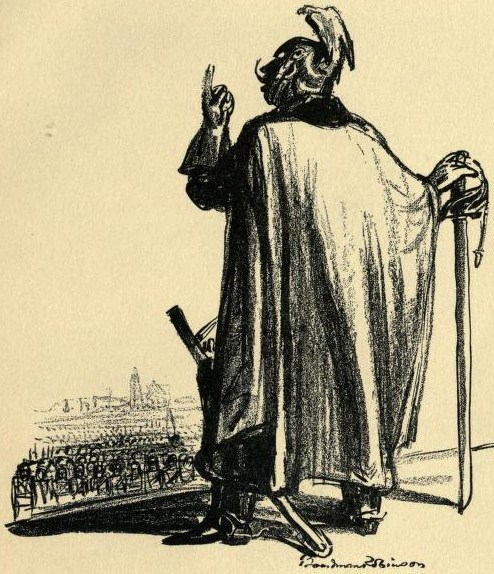
I Believe in the Sword and Almighty God, 1914

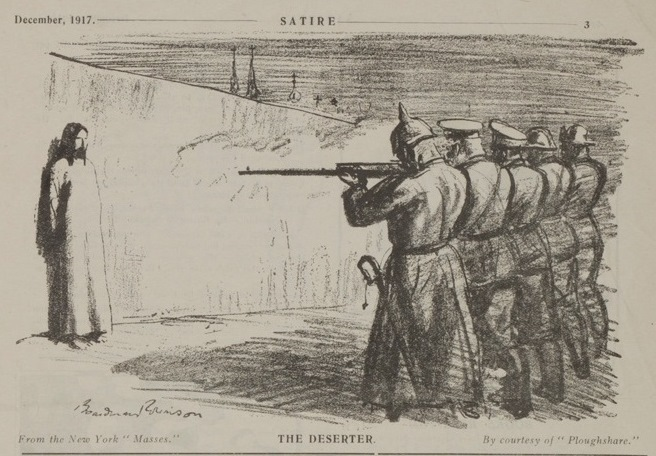
The Deserter, 1916
