= John Reed (journalist) =

American journalist, poet, and activist (1887–1920)

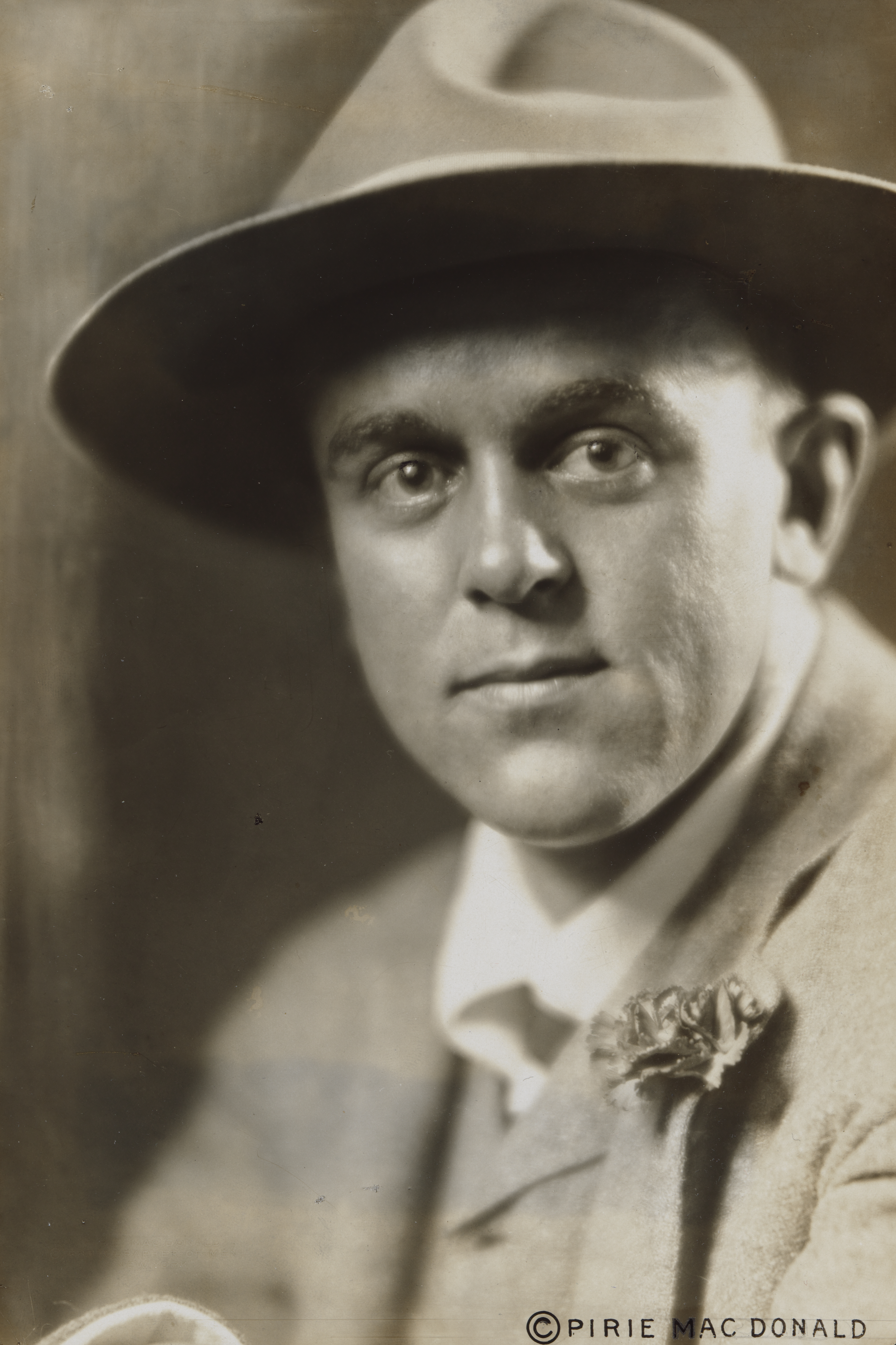
- Reed c. 1916
- Born: John Silas Reed; October 22, 1887; Portland, Oregon, U.S.
- Died: October 17, 1920 (aged 32); Moscow, Russian SFSR
- Resting place: Kremlin Wall Necropolis, Moscow
- Education: Harvard University
- Occupations: Journalist; poet; political activist
- Political party: Communist Labor Party of America
- Spouse: Louise Bryant (m. 1916)

John Silas "Jack" Reed (October 22, 1887 – October 17, 1920) was an American journalist, poet, and communist activist. Reed first gained prominence as a war correspondent during the Mexican Revolution for Metropolitan and World War I for The Masses. He is best known for his coverage of the October Revolution in Petrograd, Russia, which he wrote about in his 1919 book Ten Days That Shook the World.

Reed supported the Soviet takeover of Russia, even briefly taking up arms to join the Red Guards in 1918. He hoped for a similar communist revolution in the United States, and co-founded the short-lived Communist Labor Party of America in 1919. He died in Moscow of spotted typhus in 1920. At the time of his death, he may have soured on the Soviet leadership, but he was given a hero's burial by the Soviet Union and is one of only five Americans buried at the Kremlin Wall Necropolis.

== Early life and education ==
Reed was born on October 22, 1887, in his maternal grandparents' mansion in what is now the Goose Hollow neighborhood of Portland, Oregon. His grandmother's household had Chinese servants. Reed wrote of paying a nickel to a "Goose Hollowite" (young toughs in a gang in the working-class neighborhood below King's Hill) to keep from being beaten up. In 2001 a memorial bench dedicated to Reed was installed in Washington Park, which overlooks the site of Reed's birthplace (the mansion no longer exists).

His mother, Margaret Reed (née Green), was the daughter of Portland industrialist Henry Dodge Green, who had made a fortune founding and operating three businesses: the first gas & light company, the first pig iron smelter on the West Coast, and the Portland water works (he was its second owner). SW Green Avenue was named in his honor.

John's father, Charles Jerome Reed, was born in the East and came to Portland as the representative of an agricultural machinery manufacturer. With his ready wit, he quickly won acceptance in Portland's business community. The couple had married in 1886, and the family's wealth came from the Green side, not the Reed side.

A sickly child, young Jack grew up surrounded by nurses and servants. His mother carefully selected his upper-class playmates. He had a brother, Harry, who was two years younger. Jack and his brother were sent to the recently established Portland Academy, a private school. Jack was bright enough to pass his courses but could not be bothered to work for top marks, as he found school dry and tedious. In September 1904, he was sent to Morristown, a New Jersey prep school, to prepare for college. His father, who did not attend college, wanted his sons to go to Harvard. At Morristown Jack continued his poor classroom performance, but made the football team and showed some literary promise.

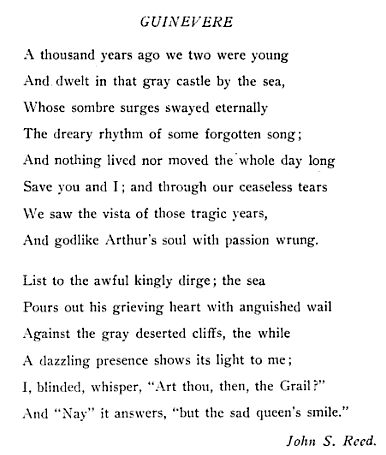
The Harvard Monthly Vol. 44 (1907)

Reed failed his first attempt at Harvard College's admission exam but passed on his second try, and enrolled in the fall of 1906. Tall, handsome, and lighthearted, he threw himself into all manner of student activities. He was a member of the cheerleading team and the swimming team, served on the editorial boards of the Harvard Lampoon and The Harvard Monthly, was president of the Harvard Glee Club, and founded the Harvard Radcliffe Dramatic Club (then simply the Dramatic Club). In 1910 he held a position in the Hasty Pudding Theatricals, and also wrote music and lyrics for their show Diana's Debut. Reed failed to make the football and crew teams, but excelled in swimming and water polo. He was also made "Ivy orator and poet" in his senior year.

Reed attended meetings of the Socialist Club, over which his friend Walter Lippmann presided, but never joined. The group introduced legislation into the state legislature, attacked the university for failing to pay its servants living wages, and petitioned the administration to establish a course on socialism. Reed later recalled:

All this made no ostensible difference in the look of Harvard society, and probably the club-men and the athletes, who represented us to the world, never even heard of it. But it made me, and many others, realize that there was something going on in the dull outside world more thrilling than college activities, and turned our attention to the writings of men like H. G. Wells and Graham Wallas, wrenching us away from the Oscar Wildian dilettantism which had possessed undergraduate litterateurs for generations.

Reed graduated from Harvard College in 1910. That summer he set out to see more of the "dull outside world", visiting England, France, and Spain before returning home to America the following spring. To pay his fare to Europe, Reed worked as a common laborer on a cattle boat. His travels were encouraged by his favorite professor, Charles Townsend Copeland ("Copey"), who told him he must "see life" if he wanted to successfully write about it.

== Career ==
=== Journalist ===
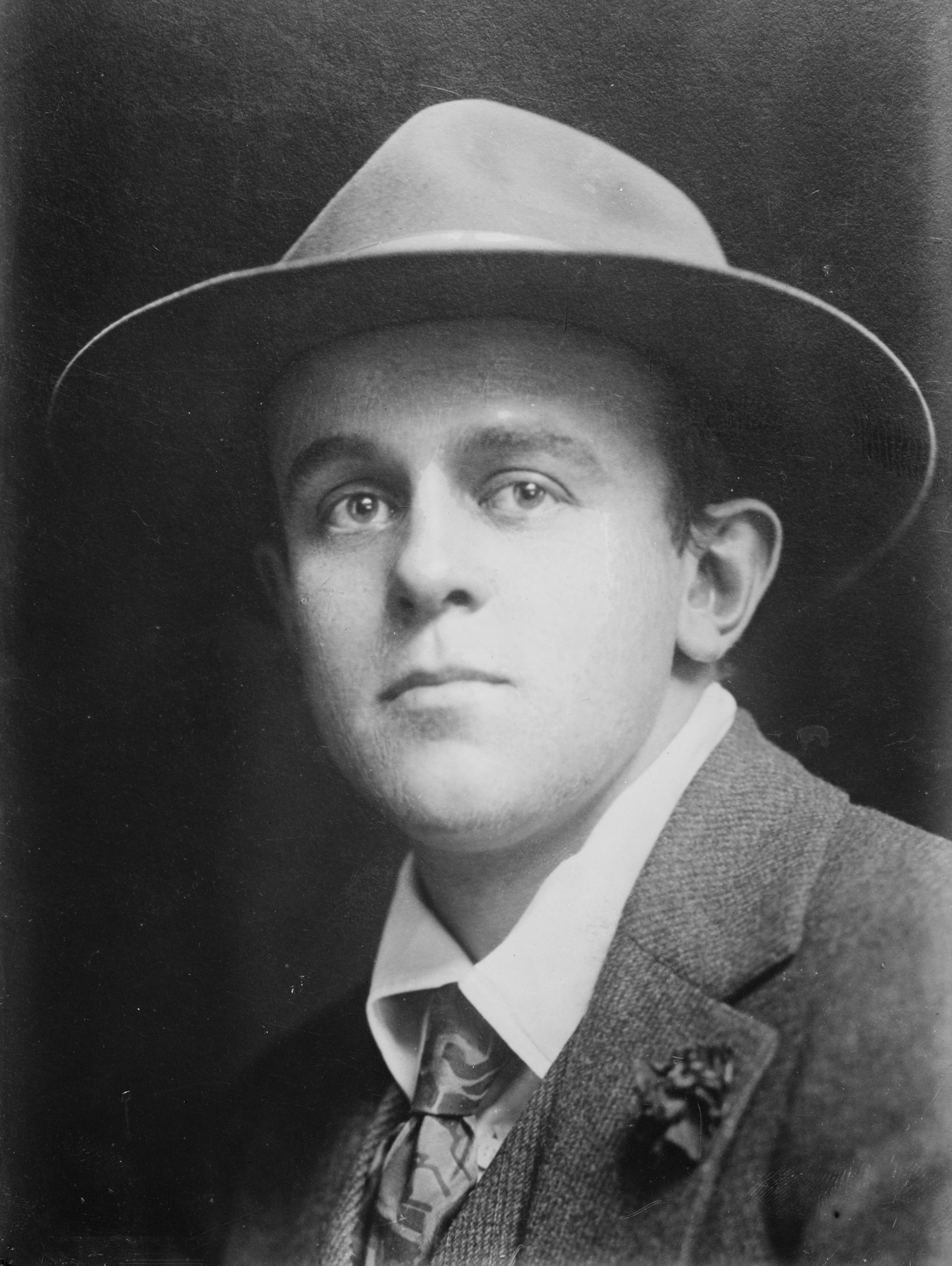
A native of Oregon, Reed made New York City the base of his operations.

Reed had determined to become a journalist and set out to make his mark in New York. Reed made use of a valuable contact from Harvard, Lincoln Steffens, who was establishing a reputation as a muckraker. Steffens quickly appreciated Reed's skills and intellect and landed his young admirer an entry-level position on The American Magazine, where Reed read manuscripts, corrected proofs, and helped with the composition. Reed supplemented his salary by taking an additional job as the business manager of a new short-lived quarterly magazine, Landscape Architecture.

Reed made his home in Greenwich Village, a burgeoning hub of poets, writers, activists, and artists. He came to love New York, relentlessly exploring it and writing poems about it. His formal jobs on the magazines paid the rent, but it was as a freelance journalist that Reed sought to establish himself. He collected rejection slips, circulating an essay and short stories about his six months in Europe, eventually breaking through in the Saturday Evening Post. Within a year, Reed had other work accepted by Collier's, The Forum, and The Century Magazine. One of his poems was set to music by composer Arthur Foote, another by Marion Bauer. The editors at The American came to see him as a contributor and began to publish his work.

Reed's serious interest in social problems was first aroused about this time by Steffens and Ida Tarbell. He moved beyond them to a more radical political position than theirs. In 1913, he joined the staff of The Masses, edited by Max Eastman. Reed contributed more than 50 articles, reviews, and shorter pieces to this socialist publication.

The first of Reed's many arrests came in Paterson, New Jersey, in 1913, for attempting to speak on behalf of strikers in the New Jersey silk mills. The harsh treatment meted out by the authorities to the strikers and the short jail term he served further radicalized Reed. He allied with the general socialist union, the Industrial Workers of the World. His account of his experiences was published in June as an article, "War in Paterson". During the same year, following a suggestion made by IWW leader Bill Haywood, Reed put on "The Pageant of the Paterson Strike" in Madison Square Garden as a benefit for the strikers.

In the autumn of 1913, Reed was sent to Mexico by the Metropolitan Magazine to report on the Mexican Revolution. He shared the perils of Pancho Villa's army for four months and was with Villa's Constitutional (Constitutionalist) Army (whose "Primer Jefe" political chief was Venustiano Carranza) when it defeated Federal forces at Torreón, opening the way for its advance on Mexico City. Reed adored Villa, but Carranza left him cold.

Reed's reporting on the Villistas in a series of outstanding magazine articles gained him a national reputation as a war correspondent. Reed deeply sympathized with the peons and vehemently opposed American intervention. Reed's reports were collected and published as the book Insurgent Mexico (1914).

On April 30, 1914, Reed arrived in Colorado, scene of the recent Ludlow massacre, which was part of the Colorado Coalfield War between the John D. Rockefeller Jr.-owned Colorado Fuel & Iron Company and United Mine Workers union supporters. There he spent a little more than a week, during which he investigated the events, spoke on behalf of the miners, and wrote an impassioned article on the subject ("The Colorado War", published in July). He came to believe much more deeply in class conflict.

Reed spent summer 1914 in Provincetown, Massachusetts with Mabel Dodge and her son, putting together Insurgent Mexico and interviewing President Wilson on the subject. The resulting report, much watered down at White House insistence, was not a success.

=== War correspondent ===
On August 14, 1914, shortly after Germany declared war on France, Reed set sail for neutral Italy, on assignment for the Metropolitan. He met his lover Mabel Dodge in Naples, and the pair made their way to Paris. Reed believed the war was the result of imperialist commercial rivalries and felt little sympathy for any of the parties.

In an unsigned piece titled "The Traders' War", published in the September 1914 issue of The Masses, Reed wrote:

The real War, of which this sudden outburst of death and destruction is only an incident, began long ago. It has been raging for tens of years, but its battles have been so little advertised that they have been hardly noted. It is a clash of Traders...

What has democracy to do in alliance with Nicholas, the Tsar? Is it Liberalism which is marching from the Petersburg of Father Gapon, from the Odessa of the pogroms?...

No. There is a falling out among commercial rivals....

We, who are Socialists, must hope—we may even expect—that out of this horror of bloodshed and dire destruction will come far-reaching social changes—and a long step forward towards our goal of Peace among Men.

But we must not be duped by this editorial buncombe about Liberalism going forth to Holy War against Tyranny.

This is not Our War.

In France, Reed was frustrated by wartime censorship and the difficulty of reaching the front. Reed and Dodge went to London, and Dodge soon left for New York, to Reed's relief. The rest of 1914 he spent drinking with French prostitutes and pursuing an affair with a German woman. The pair went to Berlin in early December. While there, Reed interviewed Karl Liebknecht, one of the few socialists in Germany to vote against war credits. Reed was deeply disappointed by the general collapse in working-class solidarity promised by the Second International, and by its replacement with militarism and nationalism.

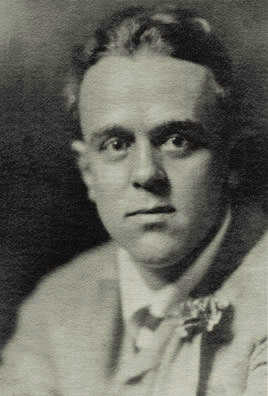
Reed c. 1917

He returned to New York in December and wrote more about the war. In 1915, he traveled to Central Europe, accompanied by Boardman Robinson, a Canadian artist and frequent Masses contributor. Traveling from Thessaloniki, they saw scenes of profound devastation in Serbia (including a bombed-out Belgrade), also going through Bulgaria and Romania. They passed through the Jewish Pale of Settlement in Bessarabia. In Chełm, they were arrested and incarcerated for several weeks. At risk of being shot for espionage, they were saved by the American ambassador.

Traveling to Russia, Reed was outraged to learn that the American ambassador in Petrograd was inclined to believe they were spies. Reed and Robinson were rearrested when they tried to slip into Romania. This time the British ambassador (Robinson being a British subject) finally secured permission for them to leave, but not until after all their papers were seized in Kiev. In Bucharest, the duo spent time piecing together more of their journey. At one point Reed traveled to Constantinople in hopes of seeing action at Gallipoli. From these experiences he wrote the book, The War in Eastern Europe, published in April 1916.

After returning to New York, Reed visited his mother in Portland. There he met and fell in love with Louise Bryant, who joined him on the East Coast in January 1916. Though happily involved, both also had affairs with others in accordance with their bohemian circle and ideas about sexual liberation. Early in 1916, Reed met the young playwright Eugene O'Neill. Beginning that May, the three rented a cottage in Provincetown, Massachusetts, a summer destination on Cape Cod for many artists and writers from Greenwich Village. Not long after, Bryant and O'Neill began a romance.

That summer Reed covered the presidential nominating conventions. He endorsed Woodrow Wilson, believing that he would make good on his promise to keep America out of the war. In November 1916 he married Bryant in Peekskill, New York. The same year, he underwent an operation at Johns Hopkins Hospital to remove a kidney. He was hospitalized until mid-December. The operation rendered him ineligible for conscription and saved him from registering as a conscientious objector, as had been his intention. During 1916 he privately published Tamburlaine and Other Verses, in an edition of 500 copies.

As the country raced towards war, Reed was marginalized: his relationship with the Metropolitan was over. He pawned his late father's watch and sold his Cape Cod cottage to the birth control activist and sex educator Margaret Sanger.

When Wilson asked for a declaration of war on April 2, 1917, Reed shouted at a hastily convened meeting of the People's Council in Washington: "This is not my war, and I will not support it. This is not my war, and I will have nothing to do with it." In July and August, Reed continued to write vehement articles against the war for The Masses, which the United States Post Office Department refused to mail, and for Seven Arts. Due to antiwar articles by Reed and Randolph Bourne, the arts magazine lost its financial backing and ceased publication. Reed was stunned by the nation's pro-war fervor, and his career lay in ruins.

=== Witness to the Russian Revolution ===
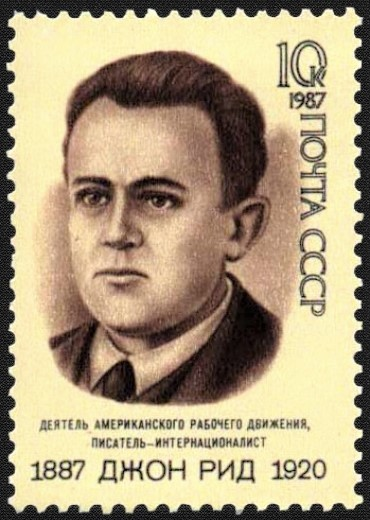
1987 Soviet stamp reading, "Worker of the American labor movement, internationalist writer, John Reed"

On August 17, 1917, Reed and Bryant set sail from New York to Europe, having first provided the State Department with legally sworn assurances that neither would represent the Socialist Party at a forthcoming conference in Stockholm. The pair were going as working journalists to report on the sensational developments taking place in the fledgling republic of Russia. Traveling by way of Finland, the pair arrived in the capital city of Petrograd immediately after the failed military coup of monarchist General Lavr Kornilov. This was an attempt to topple the Provisional Government of Alexander Kerensky by force of arms. Reed and Bryant found the Russian economy in shambles. Several of the subject nations of the old empire, such as Finland and Ukraine, had gained autonomy and were seeking separate military accommodations with Germany.

Reed and Bryant were in Petrograd for the October Revolution, in which the Bolsheviks, headed by Vladimir Lenin, toppled the Kerensky government; the Bolsheviks believed this was the first blow of a worldwide socialist revolution.

Food shortages made the situation dire in the capital, and social disorder reigned. Reed later recalled:

The last month of the Kerensky regime was marked first by the falling off of the bread supply from 2 pounds a day to 1 pound, to half a pound, to a quarter of a pound, and, the final week, no bread at all. Holdups and crime increased to such an extent that you could hardly walk down the streets. The papers were full of it. Not only had the government broken down, but the municipal government had absolutely broken down. The city militia was quite disorganized and up in the air, and the street-cleaning apparatus and all that sort of thing had broken down—milk and everything of that sort.

A mood for radical change was in the air. The Bolsheviks, seeking an all-socialist government and immediate end to Russian participation in the war, sought the transfer of power from Kerensky to a Congress of Soviets, a gathering of elected workers' and soldiers' deputies to be convened in October. The Kerensky government considered this a kind of coup, and moved to shut down the Bolshevik press. It issued warrants of arrest for the Soviet leaders and prepared to transfer the troops of the Petrograd garrison, believed to be unreliable, back to the front. A Military Revolutionary Committee of the Soviets, dominated by the Bolshevik Party, determined to seize power on behalf of the future Congress of Soviets. At 11 pm on the evening of November 7, 1917, it captured the Winter Palace, the seat of Kerensky's government. Reed and Bryant were present during the fall of the Winter Palace, the symbolic event that started the Bolshevik Revolution.

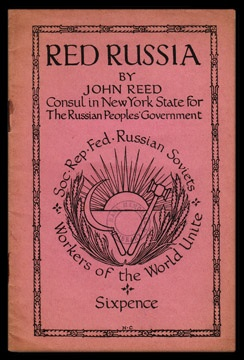
The cover of this 1919 British pamphlet emphasizes Reed's short-lived status as Soviet consul.

Reed was an enthusiastic supporter of the new revolutionary socialist government. He went to work for the new People's Commissariat for Foreign Affairs, translating decrees and news of the new government into English. "I also collaborated in the gathering of material and data and distributing of papers to go into the German trenches," Reed later recalled.

Reed was close to the inner circle of the new government. He met Leon Trotsky and was introduced to Lenin during a break of the Constituent Assembly on January 18, 1918. By December, his funds were nearly exhausted, and he took a job with American Raymond Robins of the International Red Cross. Robins wanted to set up a newspaper promoting American interests; Reed complied. But in the dummy issue he prepared, he included a warning beneath the masthead: "This paper is devoted to promoting the interests of American capital."

The dissolution of the Constituent Assembly left Reed unmoved. Two days later, armed with a rifle, he joined a patrol of Red Guards prepared to defend the Foreign Office from counter-revolutionary attack. Reed attended the opening of the Third Congress of Soviets, where he gave a short speech promising to bring the news of the revolution to America, saying he hoped it would "call forth an answer from America's oppressed and exploited masses." American journalist Edgar Sisson told Reed that he was being used by the Bolsheviks for their propaganda, a rebuke he accepted.

In January, Trotsky, responding to Reed's concern about the safety of his substantial archive, offered Reed the post of Soviet Consul in New York. As the United States did not recognize the Bolshevik government, Reed's credentials would almost certainly have been rejected and he would have faced prison (which would have given the Bolsheviks some propaganda material). Most Americans in Petrograd considered Reed's appointment a massive blunder. Businessman Alexander Gumberg met with Lenin, showing him a prospectus in which Reed called for massive American capital support for Russia and for setting up a newspaper to express the American viewpoint on the negotiations at Brest-Litovsk. Lenin found the proposal unsavory and withdrew Reed's nomination. Learning of Gumberg's intervention, Reed always denigrated him afterward.

Reed and Bryant wrote and published books about their Russian experiences. Bryant's Six Red Months in Russia appeared first, but Reed's 10 Days That Shook the World (1919) garnered more notice.

Bryant returned to the United States in January 1918, but Reed did not reach New York City until April 28. On his way back, Reed traveled from Russia to Finland; he did not have a visa or passport while crossing to Finland. In Turku harbor, when Reed was boarding a ship on his way to Stockholm, Finnish police arrested him; he was held at Kakola prison in Turku until he was released. From Finland, Reed traveled to Kristiania, Norway via Stockholm.

Because he remained under indictment in the Masses case, federal authorities immediately met Reed when his ship reached New York, holding him on board for more than eight hours while they searched his belongings. Reed's papers, the material from which he intended to write his book, were seized. He was released upon his own recognizance after his attorney, Morris Hillquit, promised to make him available at the Federal Building the next day. His papers were not returned to him until November.

=== Radical political activist ===
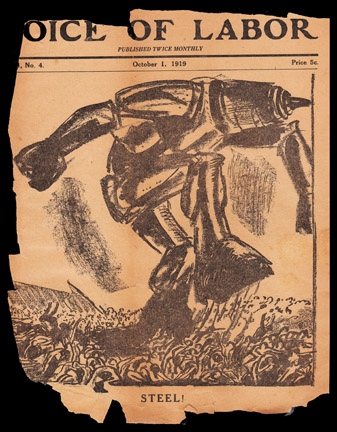
Cover of Reed's Voice of Labor, October 1919

Back in America, Reed and Bryant defended the Bolsheviks and opposed the American intervention. Incensed at Russia's departure from the war against Germany, the public gave Reed a generally cold reception. While he was in Russia, his articles in The Masses, particularly one headlined "Knit a straight-jacket for your soldier boy", had been instrumental in the government gaining an indictment for sedition against the magazine (antiwar agitation was considered sedition and treason).

The first Masses trial ended in a hung jury the day before Reed reached New York. The defendants, including him, were to be retried. He immediately posted $2,000 bail on April 29. The second Masses trial also ended in a hung jury.

In Philadelphia, Reed stood outside a closed hall on May 31, and harangued a crowd of 1,000 about the case and the war until police dragged him away. He was arrested for inciting a riot, and posted $5,000 bail. Reed became more aggressively political, intolerant, and self-destructive. On September 14, he was arrested for the third time since returning from Russia, charged with violating the Sedition Act and freed on $5,000 bail. This was a day after possibly the largest demonstration for Bolshevik Russia was held in the United States (in the Bronx). Reed had passionately defended the revolution, which he seemed to think was coming to America as well. He tried to prevent Allied intervention in Russia, arguing that the Russians were contributing to the war effort by checking German ambitions in Ukraine and Japanese designs on Siberia, but this argument came to naught.

On February 21–22, 1919, Bryant was fiercely grilled before a Senate committee exploring Bolshevik propaganda activities in the US, but emerged resilient. Reed followed her. According to Homberger, his testimony was "savagely distorted" by the press. Later that day Reed went to Philadelphia to stand trial for his May speech; despite a hostile judge, press, and patriotic speech by the prosecutor, Reed's lawyer, David Wallerstein, convinced the jury the case was about free speech, and he was acquitted. Returning to New York, Reed continued speaking widely and participating in the various twists of socialist politics that year. He served as editor of The New York Communist, the weekly newspaper issued by the Left Wing Section of Greater New York.

Affiliated with the Left Wing of the Socialist Party, Reed with the other radicals was expelled from the National Socialist Convention in Chicago on August 30, 1919. The radicals split into two bitterly hostile groups, forming the Communist Labor Party of America (Reed's group, which he helped create) and, the next day, the Communist Party of America. Reed was the international delegate of the former, wrote its manifesto and platform, edited its paper, The Voice of Labor, and was denounced as "Jack the Liar" in the Communist Party organ, The Communist. Reed's writings of 1919 displayed doubts about Western-style democracy and defended the dictatorship of the proletariat. He believed this was a necessary step that would prefigure the true democracy "based upon equality and the liberty of the individual."

=== Comintern functionary ===
Indicted for sedition and hoping to secure Communist International (Comintern) backing for the CLP, Reed fled the US with a forged passport in early October 1919 on a Scandinavian frigate; he worked his way to Bergen, Norway as a stoker. Given shore leave, he disappeared to Kristiania, crossed into Sweden on October 22, passed through Finland with Ivar Lassy's help, and made his way to Moscow by train. In the cold winter of 1919–1920, he traveled in the region around Moscow, observing factories, communes, and villages. He filled notebooks with his writing and had an affair with a Russian woman.

Reed's feelings about the revolution became ambivalent. Activist Emma Goldman had recently arrived aboard the Buford, among hundreds of aliens deported by the United States under the Sedition Act. She was especially concerned about the Cheka. Reed told her that the enemies of the revolution deserved their fate, but suggested that she see Angelica Balabanoff, a critic of the current situation. He wanted Goldman to hear the other side.

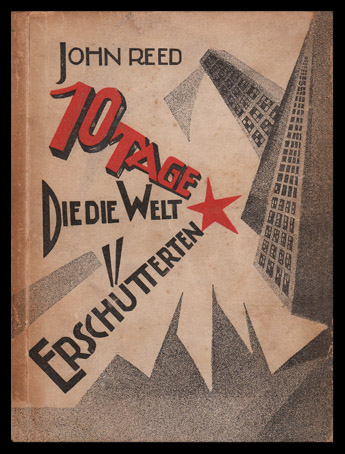
German edition of 10 Days That Shook The World, published by the Comintern in Hamburg in 1922.

Though facing the threat of arrest in Illinois, Reed tried to return to the United States in February 1920. At that time, the Soviets organized a convention to establish a United Communist Party of America. Reed attempted to leave Russia through Latvia, but his train never arrived, forcing him to hitch a ride in the boxcar of an eastbound military train to Petrograd. In March, he crossed into Helsinki, where he had radical friends, including Hella Wuolijoki, the future politician and member of parliament. With their help, he was hidden in the hold of a freighter.

On 13 March, Finnish Customs officials found Reed in a coal bunker on the ship. He was taken to the police station, where he maintained that he was seaman "Jim Gormley". Eventually, the jewels, photographs, letters, and fake documents he had in his possession forced him to reveal his true identity. Although beaten several times and threatened with torture, he refused to surrender the names of his local contacts. Because of his silence, he could not be tried for treason. He was charged and convicted of smuggling and having jewels in his possession (102 small diamonds worth $14,000, which were confiscated).

The US Secretary of State was satisfied with Reed's arrest and pressured the Finnish authorities for his papers. American authorities, however, remained indifferent to Reed's fate. Although Reed paid the fine for smuggling, he was still detained. His physical condition and state of mind deteriorated rapidly. He suffered from depression and insomnia, wrote alarming letters to Bryant, and on May 18 threatened a hunger strike. He was finally released in early June, and sailed for Tallinn, Estonia, on the 5th. Two days later, he traveled to Petrograd, recuperating from malnutrition and scurvy caused by having been fed dried fish almost exclusively. His spirits were high.

At the end of June, Reed traveled to Moscow. After he discussed with Bryant the possibility of her joining him, she gained passage on a Swedish tramp steamer and arrived in Gothenburg on August 10. At the same time, Reed attended the Second Comintern Congress. Although his mood was as jovial and boisterous as ever, his physical appearance had deteriorated.

During this congress, Reed bitterly objected to the deference other revolutionaries showed to the Russians. The latter believed the tide of revolutionary fervor was ebbing, and that the Communist Party needed to work within the existing institutions—a policy Reed felt would be disastrous. He was contemptuous of the bullying tactics displayed during the congress by Karl Radek and Grigory Zinoviev, who ordered Reed to attend the Congress of the Peoples of the East to be held at Baku on August 15.

The journey to Baku was a long one, five days by train through a countryside that was devastated by civil war and typhus. Reed was reluctant to go. He asked for permission to travel later, as he wanted to meet Bryant in Petrograd after she arrived from Murmansk. Zinoviev insisted that Reed take the official train: "the Comintern has made a decision. Obey." Reed, needing Soviet goodwill and unprepared for a final break with the Comintern, made the trip with reluctance. Years after abandoning communism himself, his friend Benjamin Gitlow asserted that Reed became bitterly disillusioned with the communist movement because of his treatment by Zinoviev.

During his time in Baku, Reed received a telegram announcing Bryant's arrival in Moscow. He followed her there, arriving on September 15, and was able to tell her of the events of the preceding eight months. He appeared older and his clothes were in tatters. While in Moscow, he took Bryant to meet Lenin, Trotsky, Lev Kamenev, and other leading Bolsheviks, and also to visit Moscow's ballet and art galleries.

== Death ==
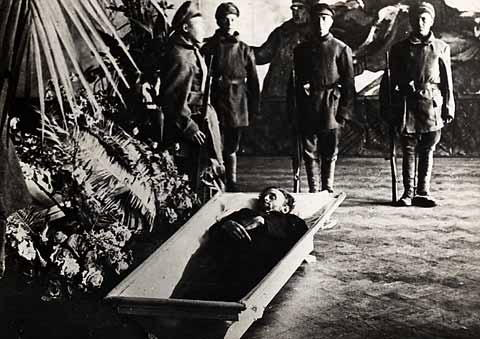
Reed's body lying in state in Moscow, 1920

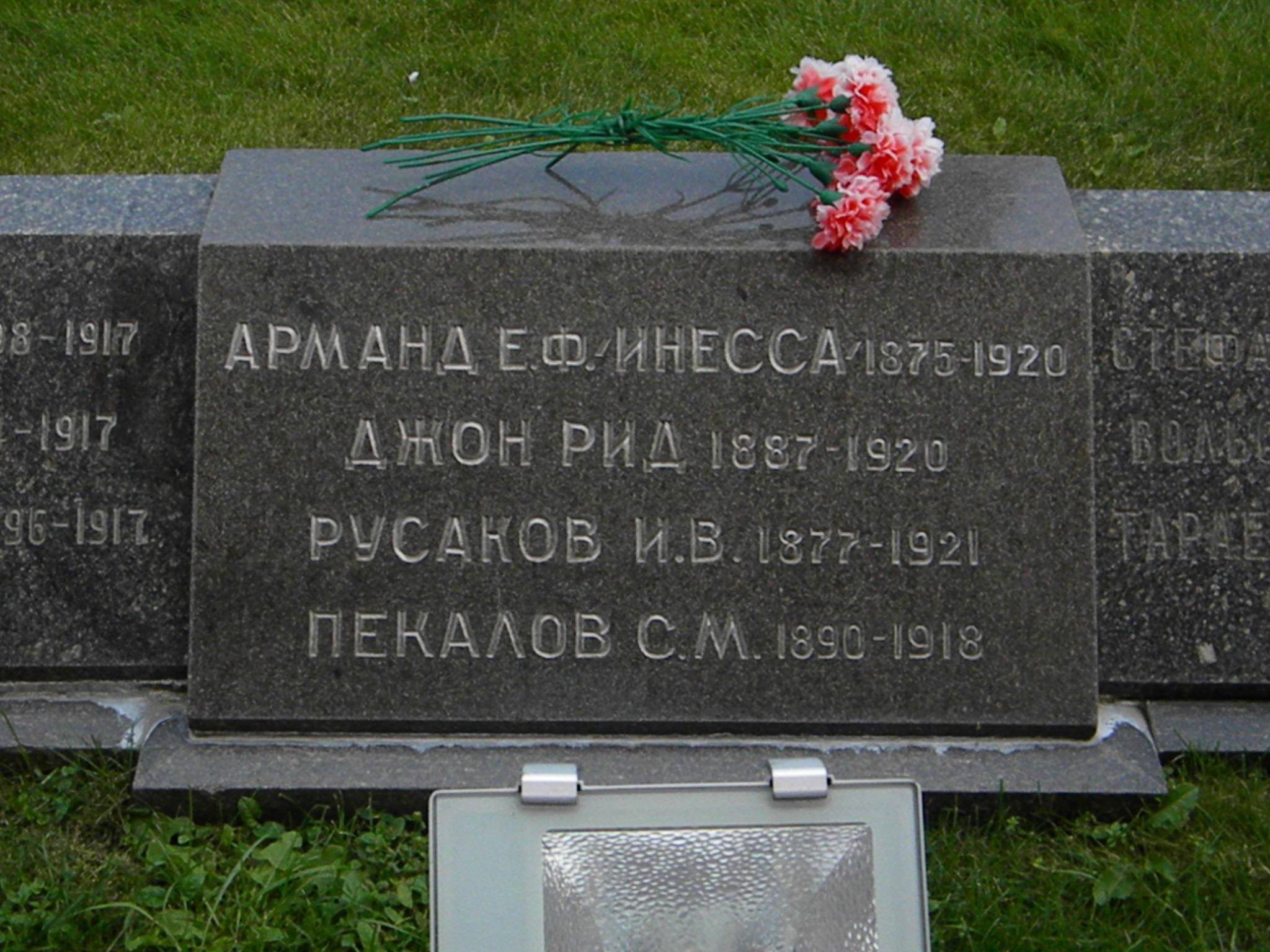
Red Square Mass Grave No. 5, with inscriptions for Inessa Armand, John Reed, Ivan Rusakov, and Semyon Pekalov.

Reed was determined to return to the United States but fell ill on September 25. At first thought to have influenza, he was hospitalized five days later and diagnosed with spotted typhus. Bryant spent all her time with him, but there were no medicines to be obtained because of the Allied blockade. Reed's mind started to wander; eventually he lost the use of the right side of his body and could no longer speak. His wife was holding his hand when he died in Moscow on October 17, 1920. After a hero's funeral, Reed's body was buried in Mass Grave No. 5 at the Kremlin Wall Necropolis next to Inessa Armand. Only three Americans have received this honor; the others are C. E. Ruthenberg, the founder of the Communist Party USA; and Bill Haywood, a founding member and leader of the Industrial Workers of the World.

== Legacy ==
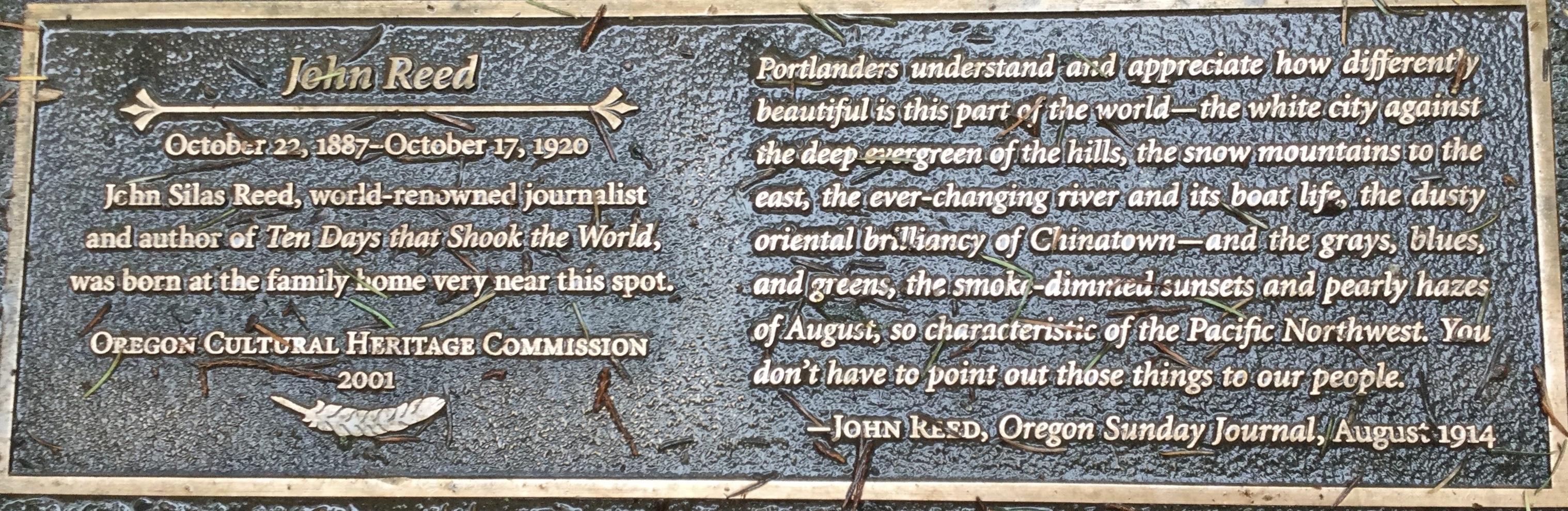
A plaque honoring John Silas Reed in Washington Park in Portland.

Reed's interpretation in popular culture has varied. Some, such as biographer Robert A. Rosenstone, have called him a romantic, while Upton Sinclair derided him as a "playboy of the revolution". For the communist movement to which he belonged, Reed became a symbol of the international nature of the October Revolution, a martyr buried at the Kremlin wall amid solemn fanfare, his name to be uttered reverently as a member of the radical pantheon. The Harvard Lampoon later memorialized Reed in a stained glass window in their building with a hammer and sickle.

=== Representation in other media ===
- Soviet director Sergei Eisenstein's influential 1927 silent film October: Ten Days That Shook the World was based on Reed's book.
- John Dos Passos included a highly stylized, brief biography of Reed in his 1932 novel/history work 1919, the second part of his U.S.A. trilogy.
- The 1958 Soviet film In October Days (Russian: В дни Октября), directed by Sergei Vasilyev, depicted Reed and Bryant.
- Actor and director Warren Beatty made the film Reds (1981), based on Reed's life. Beatty starred as Reed, Diane Keaton as Louise Bryant and Jack Nicholson as Eugene O'Neill. The movie won three Academy Awards and was nominated for nine others.
- Two films are based on Reed's accounts of the Mexican Revolution, one with two parts released a year apart. Mexican director Paul Leduc made Reed: Insurgent Mexico (1973). A Mexican–Soviet-Italian co-production released Red Bells (1982) and Red Bells II (1983), both directed by Sergei Bondarchuk, with Franco Nero as Reed.

== Bibliography ==
- Diana's Debut. Lyrics by J. S. Reed, music by Walter S. Langsham. Privately printed, Cambridge 1910
- Sangar: The Mad Recreant Knight of the West. Dedicated to Lincoln Steffens. Frederick C. Bursch, Hillacre Riverside, CT 1913
- The Day in Bohemia, of Life Among the Artists. Privately printed Riverside, CT 1913
- Everymagazine, An Immortality Play. Words by John Reed, music by Bill Daly. Privately printed, New York, 1913
- Insurgent Mexico. D. Appleton & Co., New York 1914
- The War in Eastern Europe. Charles Scribner's Sons, New York 1916
- Freedom: A Prison Play. 1916
- Tamburlaine and Other Verses. Frederick C. Bursch, Hillacre Riverside, CT 1917
- The Sisson Documents. Liberator Publishing Co., New York 1918
- Ten Days that Shook the World. Boni & Liveright, New York 1919
- Red Russia: The Triumph of the Bolsheviki. Workers' Socialist Federation, London 1919. – pamphlet collecting journalism from The Liberator
- Red Russia: Book II. Workers' Socialist Federation
- The Structure of the Soviet State. Liberator Publishing Co., New York 1918
- Daughter of the Revolution and Other Stories. Floyd Dell, editor. Vanguard Press, New York 1927
- The Education of John Reed: Selected Writings. John Stuart, editor. International Publishers, New York 1955
- Adventures of a Young Man: Short Stories from Life. Seven Seas, Berlin 1966. City Lights, San Francisco 1975
- Collected Poems. Corliss Lamont, editor. Lawrence Hill & Co., Westport, Conn. 1985
- Homberger, Eric; Biggart, John, eds. (1992). John Reed and the Russian Revolution. doi:10.1007/978-1-349-21836-3. ISBN 978-1-349-21838-7.
- Shaking the World: John Reed's Revolutionary Journalism. John Newsinger, editor. Bookmarks, London 1998

== See also ==
- Sen Katayama, the Japanese American buried in the Kremlin Wall
- Norman Bethune, a Canadian physician who supported the Chinese Eighth Route Army during the Second Sino-Japanese War

== Citations ==
=== Works cited ===
- Hicks, Granville; Stuart, John (1936). John Reed: The Making of a Revolutionary. New York: Macmillan.
- Homberger, Eric (1990). John Reed. Manchester University Press. ISBN 978-0-7190-2194-7.
