= The War in Eastern Europe =

Book by John Reed

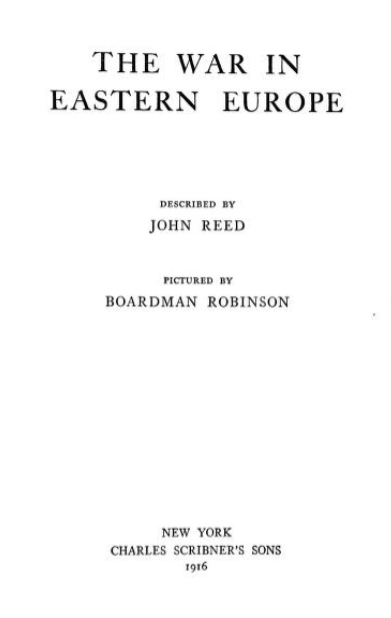
- Title page for The War in Eastern Europe (1916)
- Author: John Reed
- Illustrator: Boardman Robinson
- Language: English
- Genre: World War I Personal narratives
- Publisher: Charles Scribner's Sons
- Publication date: April 1916

The War in Eastern Europe is a book that describes John Reed's second trip after the first World War broke out.
