= Sergey Zorin =

Soviet politician (1890–1937)

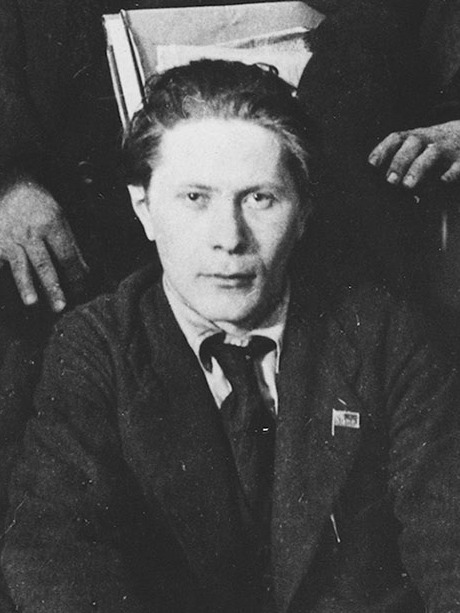
- Sergey Zorin, by Isaak Brodsky (1920)
- Born: 1890; Yelizavetgrad, Russian Empire
- Died: 10 September 1937 (aged 46–47); Suzdal, RSFSR, Soviet Union
- Occupation: Mayor

Sergey Semyonovich Zorin (Russian: Сергей Семёнович Зорин, born Sergey Gumberg; 1890 – 10 September 1937), was a Ukrainian politician who served as First Secretary of the Leningrad City Committee of the Russian Communist Party (Bolsheviks) (roughly equivalent to the position of mayor) from November 1919 and February 1921. In that capacity, he hosted the 2nd World Congress of the Comintern.

== Life ==
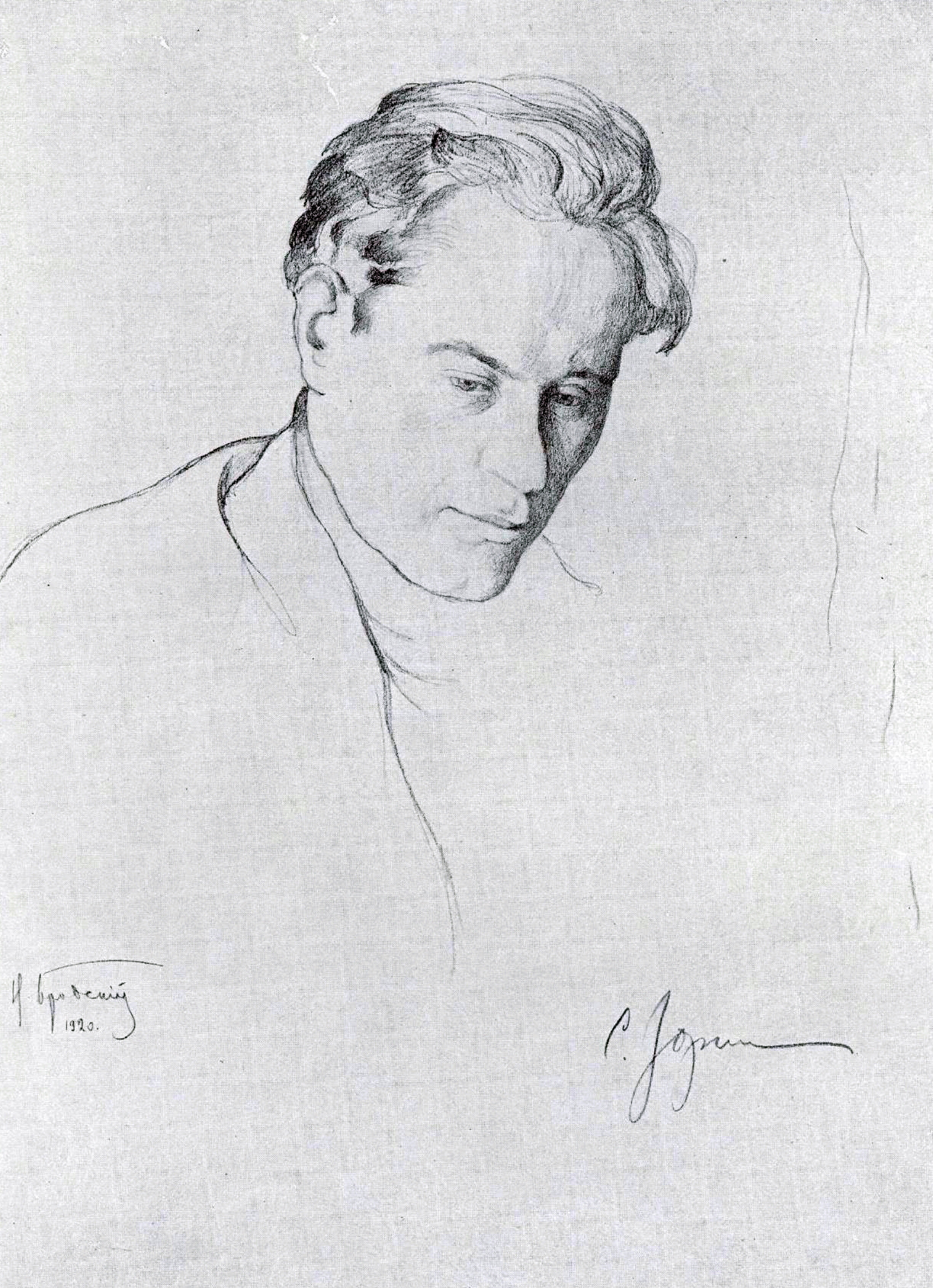
Portrait by Isaak Brodsky

Sergey Semyonovich Gumberg was born in Ukraine. His father was a rabbi in Elizavetgrad and his brother, Alexander Gumberg emigrated to the United States in 1902.

Sergey in 1911 moved to New York where he became active in the Socialist Party of America. He supported himself as an unskilled labourer before returning in March 1917 with Trotsky aboard the SS Kristianiafjord.

He was married to Lisa Zorin, with whom he hosted Emma Goldman during her stay in Russia from January 17, 1920 to December 1921.

Zorin aligned himself with the Left Opposition. He travelled to Ivanova with Alexander Voronsky in 1927, which was used as a pretext for Voronsky's expulsion from the Communist Party.

He was arrested on 1 January 1935, and sentenced to 5 years' imprisonment on 26 March that year in the Monastery of Saint Euthymius, then a prison in Suzdal. He was shot on 10 September 1937.
