= Rifka Angel =

Russian-American artist

Rifka Angel (1899–1988) was a Russian-American artist, one of the first encaustic painters in the United States. Angel is known for her use of color and naïve style.

== Life ==
Born to Jewish parents in Kalvarija, Russian Empire (now Lithuania), Rifka Angel (née Angelovitch) came to the United States in 1914 to join her father, a recent immigrant. Angel's first husband, an art student, introduced her to John Sloan, Ernest Fiene, Emil Ganso, and Alfred Maurer. Ganso suggested that she try to paint watercolors. Angel showed some of her works to Sloan and the latter helped to exhibit her watercolors.

Rifka Angel studied briefly at the Art Students League of New York with Boardman Robinson and later in Vkhutemas (Moscow, USSR) with David Shterenberg. After her return to the United States, Angel married her second husband and moved to Chicago in 1929, where their daughter, Blossom Margaret, was born in 1930. The artist began to exhibit regularly: one-person shows in 1930 and 1931 at the Knoedler Gallery, Chicago and participation in numerous group shows in other locations. In 1934, her painting was selected to represent Chicago in the MoMA's "Painting and Sculpture from 16 American Cities" exhibition.

In the mid-late 1930s, Angel lived in New York; 1936–1939 she participated in the Federal Art Project. 1940–1946 the artist spent in Hawaii and the Midwest. Since 1946 and until her last days Angel lived and worked in New York.
