= Alexander Gumberg =

Alexander Gumberg (June 26, 1888 [n.s.] – May 30, 1939) was a translator and businessman born in Kropyvnytskyi (then Elizavetgrad), part of today's Ukraine. He was a Russian citizen of ethnic Jewish origins who emigrated to the United States in 1903 and went on to become an important link between the Soviet regime and the USA following the Bolshevik seizure of power in 1917 as the translator and personal assistant of Raymond Robins of the American Red Cross. Although he was not a Bolshevik himself, his brother Sergei Gumberg–Zorin was.

Gumberg died May 30, 1939, in Norwalk, Connecticut, reportedly of a heart attack.
