= Iskhak Akhmerov =

Soviet security officer

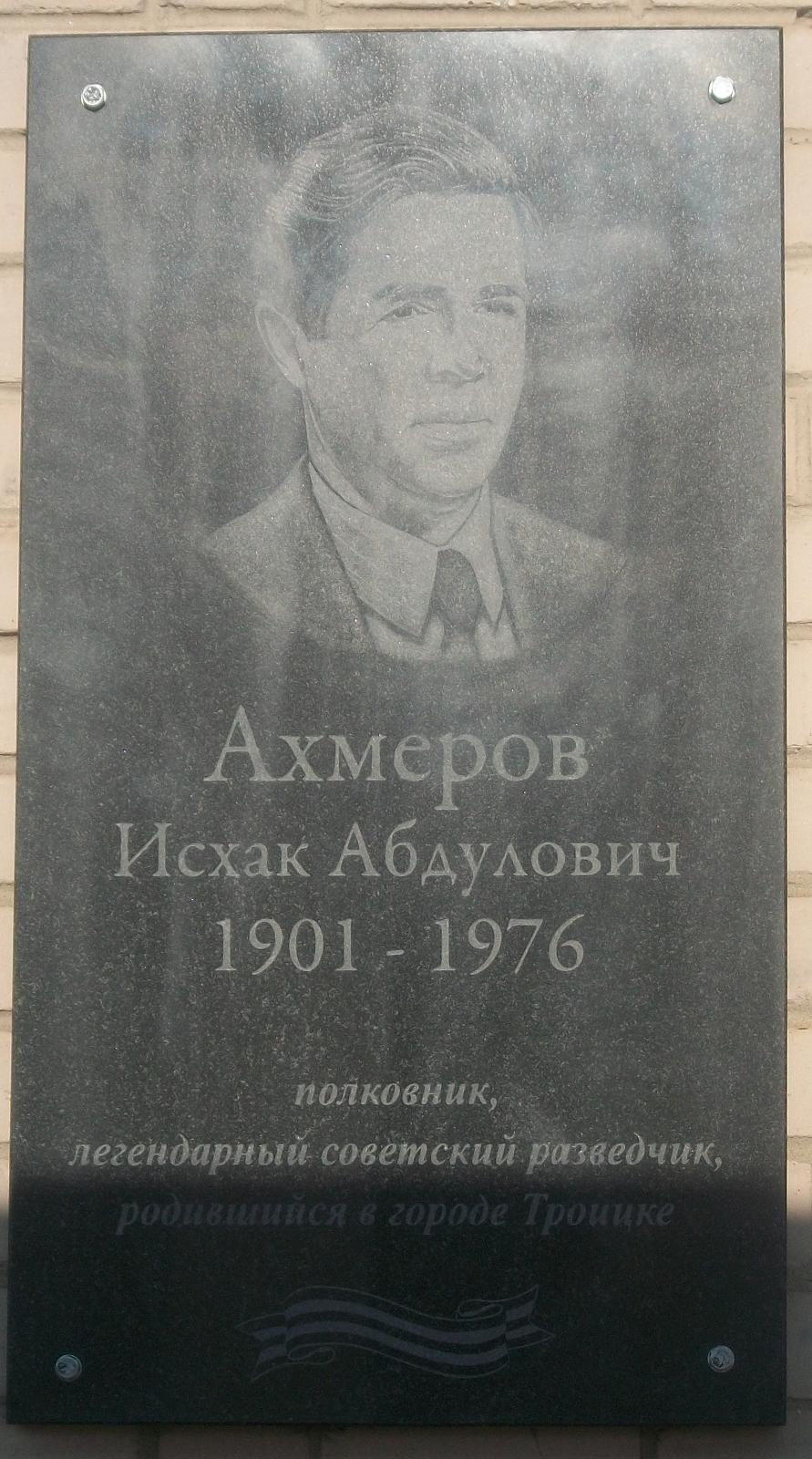
- Ishkak Akhmerov (undated)
- Born: Iskhak Abdulovich Akhmerov; April 7, 1901; Troitsk, Russian Empire
- Died: July 18, 1976 (aged 75); Moscow, USSR
- Education: First State University
- Spouse: Helen Lowry (AKA "Elza Akhmerova")
- Awards: Order of the Red Banner, Order of the Badge of Honor, badge of Honored Chekist
- Espionage activity
- Allegiance: USSR
- Service branch: OGPU/NKVD (KGB)
- Service years: 1930–1976
- Codename: William Grienke
- Codename: Michael Green
- Codename: Michael Adamec (Mayor and Albert in Venona)
- Codename: Walter Grinke (cited by Hede Massing)
- Codename: Bill and Bill Grinke (cited by Hede Massing)

Iskhak Abdulovich Akhmerov (Russian: Исха́к Абду́лович Ахме́ров, Tatar: Исхак Габдулла улы Әхмәров, romanized: İsxaq Ğabdulla ulı Əxmərov) (1901–1976) was a highly decorated OGPU/NKVD (KGB) Soviet security officer, best known to historians for his role in KGB operations in the United States 1942–1945. His name appears in the Venona decryptions over fifty times, often as signatory, and on his return to the Soviet Union in 1945/46, he rose to deputy chief of the KGB's 'illegal' intelligence section.

== Career ==
=== Background ===
Akhmerov was born in Troitsk, located in modern Chelyabinsk Oblast, and came from a Tatar background.

He joined the Russian Communist Party (Bolsheviks) in 1919, and attended the Communist University of the Toilers of the East and the First State University, where he graduated from the School of International Relations in 1930.

=== OGPU/NKVD ===
Akhmerov joined the OGPU/NKVD in 1930 and participated in the suppression of anti-Soviet movements in the USSR's Bukhara Republic between 1930 and 1931.

In 1932, Akhmerov transferred to the foreign intelligence division ("INO") of the NKVD and served as a 'legal' intelligence officer under diplomatic cover in Turkey.

In 1934, he transferred to China, where he served as an "illegal" field officer.

In 1935, he entered the United States with false identity papers. He recruited agents in the U.S. Department of State, U.S. Treasury, and U.S. intelligence services. In 1939, he was transferred back to the Soviet Union. By 1942, Akhmerov had become chief illegal resident in the United States during World War II. American agents he ran for the Soviets include Laurence Duggan, Mary Price, and Michael Straight (the last knew Akhmerov as "Michael Green"). Places he likely lived during that time include New York City and Baltimore.

According to Pavel Sudoplatov, Akhmerov ran one of five spy rings targeting the United States for atomic bomb secrets. The Akhmerov led ring targeted United States Communist Party members for the Kremlin's needs. (Note: According to Sudaplatov, another spy ring was based in Amtorg in New York City, another in the Soviet Embassy in the United States at Washington, D.C., another based in the Soviet Consulate General in San Francisco, and the fourth was based out of Mexico City and ran by Vasilevsky.)

In 1945, Akhmerov returned again to the Soviet Union to become deputy chief of the KGB's 'illegal' intelligence section (отдел нелегальной разведки). He attained the rank of colonel.

== Aliases ==
Akhmerov is known to have used the cover names "William Grienke", "Michael Green", "Michael Adamec", and several others while in the United States. His code names in the Venona project decrypts of Soviet intelligence messages are MAYOR and ALBERT.

Hede Massing describes a Soviet rezident in the United States named "Bill Grinke," "Bill," and "Walter Grinke," whom she describes as a "pedestrian" man, looking about 40 years old, who took her on from Valentin Markin at the end of 1934. When Massing reported her encounters with Noel Field, she was reporting to "Bill": she had met Field through Daily Worker journalist Marguerite Young. By "May or June 1935," another rezident named "Fred" had taken over from "Bill," at which point she began to "develop" Field. In January or February 1937, just before Ignace Reiss defected from the Soviet underground, Massing received an assignment to spy on Ludwig Lore, and "Bill" resumed her management.

Scholars John Earl Haynes and Harvey Klehr report that the FBI considered Elizabeth Bentley's "Bill" to be Akhmerov.

Scholar Raymond W. Raymond stated that "Walter Grinke" was known to Whittaker Chambers and Elizabeth Bentley as "Bill" – and that he worked for Amtorg.

== Personal and death ==
Akhmerov spoke Turkish, English and French.

He married Helen Lowry (AKA "Elza Akhmerova"), a niece of the CPUSA General Secretary Earl Browder and who also worked for Soviet intelligence. She was also a "full partner" in his espionage.

He died in 1976.

== Awards ==
Akhmerov received the Order of the Red Banner twice, the Order of the Badge of Honor, and the badge of Honored Chekist.

== Legacy ==
On April 7, 2011, a memorial plaque was unveiled in honor of the 110th anniversary of Akhmerov's birth.

On April 16, 2015, a monument for Akhmerov was unveiled at the Scarlet Field in Chelyabinsk.

A monument to him and his wife was created in Tatarstan By the artist Rim Akchurin that features the Brooklyn Bridge, symbolizing his espionage work in New York, as well as the kremlins of Moscow and Kazan.

== Venona ==
As chief of KGB in the US during WWII, Akhmerov's name appears on many decrypted Venona documents, as does his wife. During WWII, he served as one of three major contacts for comrade Vasily Zarubin. He also ran the Perlo group of Victor Perlo, which had reported previously to Jacob Golos and Elizabeth Bentley. Cables also mention the Silvermaster group under Nathan Gregory Silvermaster.
