= Amtorg Trading Corporation =

Soviet trade representation

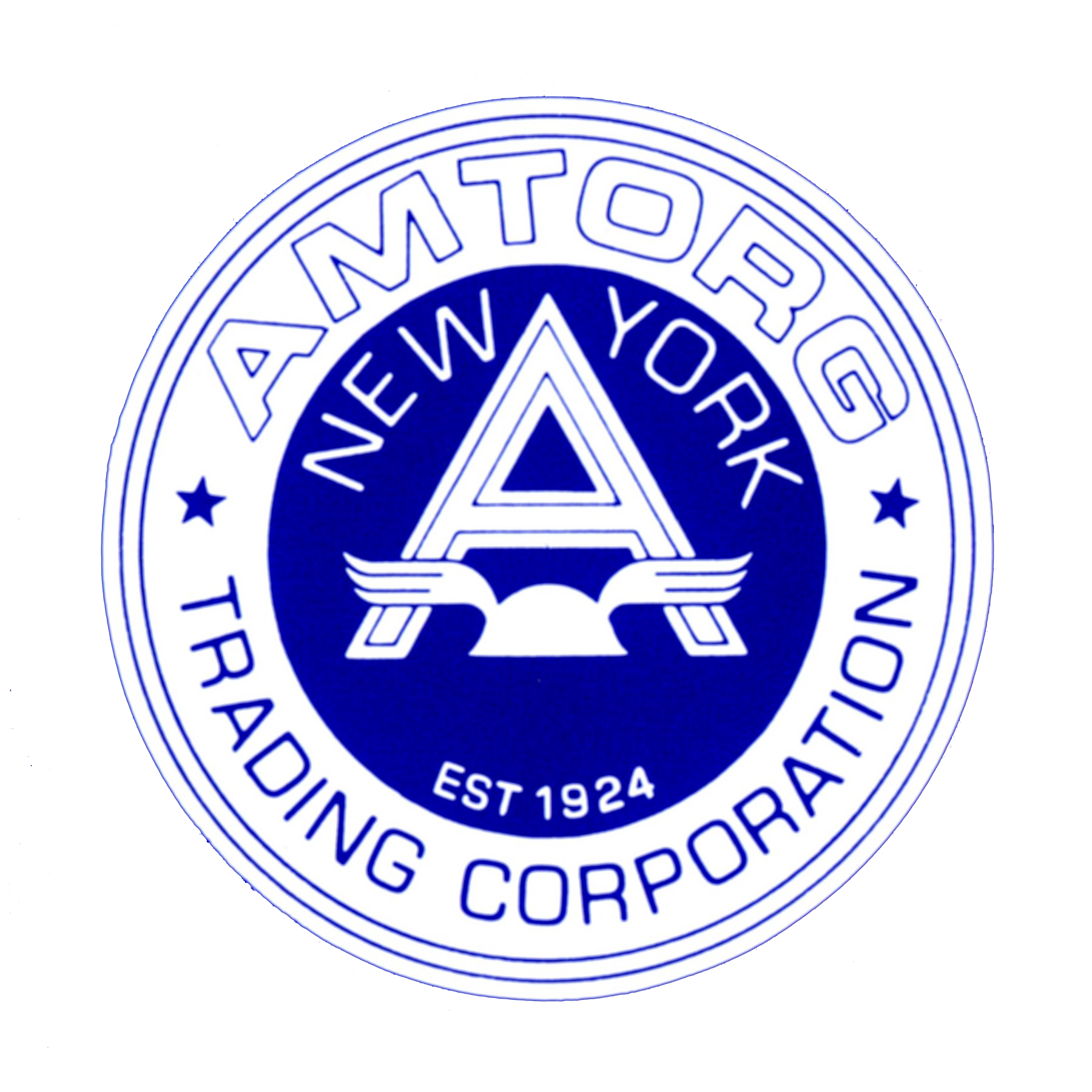

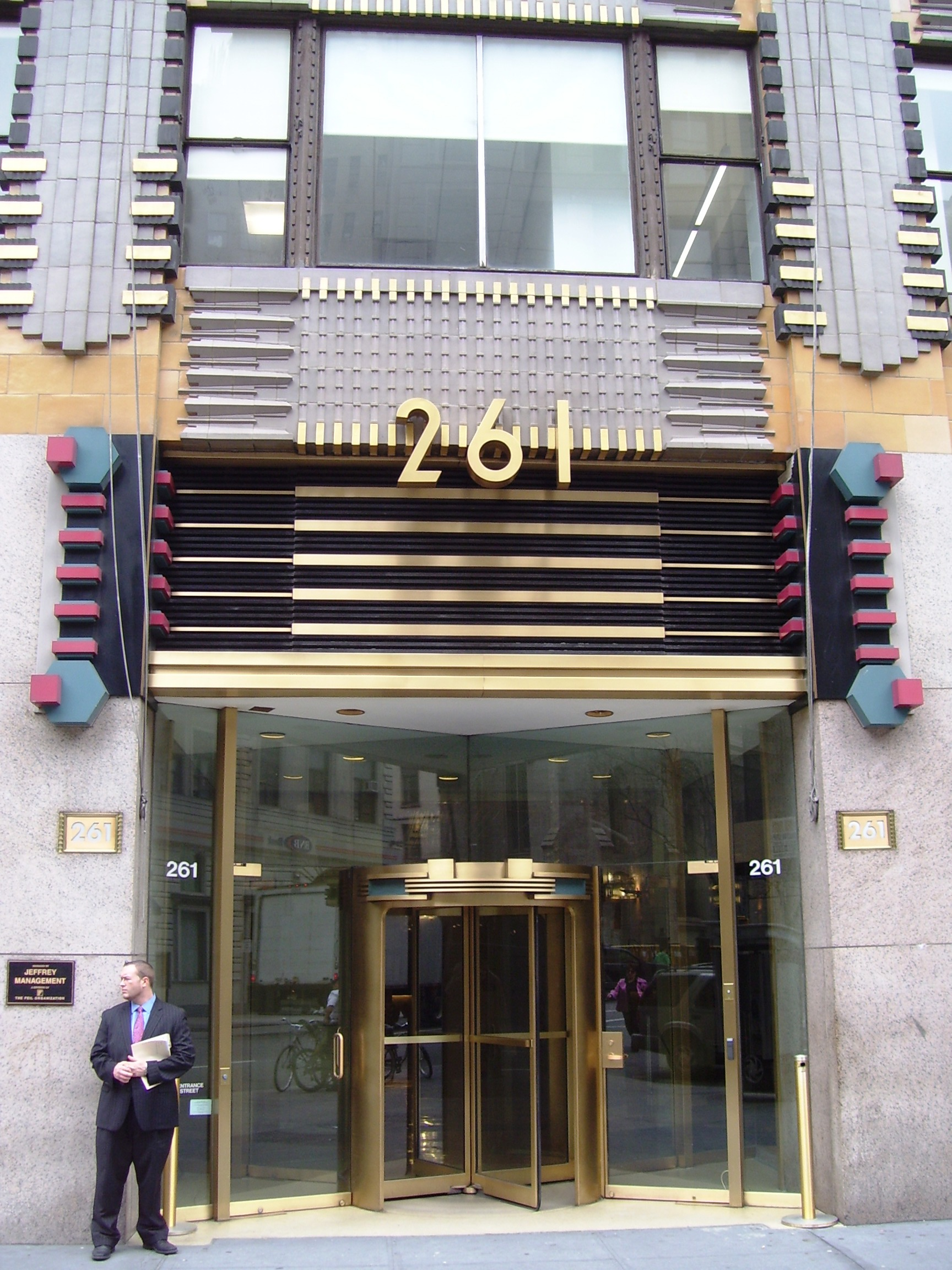
- Entrance to building 261 Fifth Avenue in New York City, where Amtorg was headquartered from 1929 to 1941
- Type: Corporation
- Industry: International trade
- Founded: May 27, 1924; 102 years ago in New York City, US
- Defunct: June 24, 1998
- Fate: Dissolution (law)
- Headquarters: New York City, United States
- Areas served: United States; Soviet Union
- Owner: Soviet Union

Amtorg Trading Corporation, also known as Amtorg (short for Amerikanskaya Torgovlya, Russian: Амторг), was the first trade representation of the Soviet Union in the United States, established in New York in 1924 by merging Armand Hammer's Allied American Corporation (Alamerico) with Products Exchange Corporation (Prodexco) and Arcos-America Inc. (the U.S. branch of All Russian Co-operative Society, ARCOS, also known as "Russia House" or "Soviet House" in Great Britain).

== History ==
Formally a semi-private joint-stock company and American corporation, Amtorg occupied a unique position in the market as the single purchaser for a communist state. Even though it did not officially represent the Soviet government, it was controlled by the People's Commissariat for Foreign Trade and, prior to the establishment of diplomatic relations between the US and the USSR in 1933, served as a de facto trade delegation and a quasi-embassy.

Amtorg handled almost all exports from the USSR, comprising mostly lumber, furs, flax, bristles, and caviar, and all imports of raw materials and machinery for Soviet industry and agriculture. It also provided American companies with information about trade opportunities in the USSR and supplied Soviet industries with technical news and information about American companies. The first headquarters were first located in Manhattan, at 165 Broadway. After 1929, it was located at 261 Fifth Avenue, with several branch offices, including, at different times, Chicago, Detroit, Los Angeles, San Francisco, and Seattle.

From 1927 to 1930, under the direction of Saul Bron and Pyotr Bogdanov, Amtorg expanded into a major commercial enterprise, with more than 100 employees. During this formative period, Amtorg was very careful to clear any legal hurdles through the leading New York law firm of Simpson Thacher & Bartlett. The main financial consultant and banker for Amtorg at that time was Chase National Bank.

Amtorg was especially useful for the USSR in negotiating contracts with major American companies such as Ford Motor Company, General Electric, International Harvester, Albert Kahn, Inc., Hugh L. Cooper, Arthur G. McKee (fr.), Freyn Engineering, DuPont de Nemours, Radio Corporation of America, and more than a hundred other companies during the first five-year plan, taking advantage of the desperate condition of the American economy during the Great Depression. In turn, American businesses, concerned about keeping their factories in operation, were eager to tap into vast Soviet markets despite continuing warnings by the U.S. Department of State that, due to the lack of diplomatic representation in the USSR., the U.S. government was unable to provide security to Americans conducting business there, and any companies transacting such business "must do so at their own risk."

In May 1930 Amtorg was investigated by the Hamilton Fish Committee on communist activities in the United States of the House of Representatives on charges of distributing communist propaganda. Even though some propaganda efforts indeed must have taken place, the Fish Committee agreed that the main evidence, the so-called "Whalen documents," was bogus. It was found that there was no sufficient competent legal evidence to prove a connection of Amtorg with subversive activities. Ironically, Amtorg would become a more important player in "subversive activities" after 1930 as it became a center not so much for communist propaganda as for industrial espionage.

According to some sources, prior to the establishment of diplomatic relations between the two countries in 1933, Amtorg served as a front for GRU/OGPU (Soviet intelligence service) operations in the US. However, Russian historian Prof. M. Yu. Mukhin (Institute of Russian History, Academy of Science of Russian Federation) asserts that during that period, Amtorg was too important for the Soviets as the only Soviet trade agency in the US, and its main focus was on obtaining credit and negotiating trade and technical-aid contracts, and that systematic intelligence gathering by the Soviets in the USA actually began after President Franklin D. Roosevelt recognized the Soviets in 1933, allowing them a permanent embassy in Washington, D.C.

There was an agreement between Nikola Tesla and Amtorg, as highlighted in declassified FBI files on Tesla. Contained within the extract Tesla agreed to supply plans, specifications, and complete information on a method and apparatus for producing very small particles in a tube open to air, for increasing the charge of the particles to the full voltage of the high-potential terminal, and for projecting the particles to a distances of a hundred miles or more. The maximum speed of the particles was specified as not less than 350 miles per second. The receipt of $25,000 fee for this disclosure was acknowledged by Nikola Tesla and by A. Bartanian of the Amtorg Trading Corporation.

During World War II, Amtorg handled the flow of military supplies to the Soviet Union, including armaments, raw materials, food, and uniforms, under the Lend-Lease program.

According to Pavel Sudoplatov, one of five spy rings targeting the United States for atomic bomb secrets was based in Amtorg in New York City. (Note: According to Sudaplatov, another spy ring was based in the Soviet Embassy in the United States at Washington, D.C., another based in the Soviet Consulate General in San Francisco, another was based out of Mexico City and ran by Vasilevsky, and the fourth was the Akhmerov led ring which targeted United States Communist Party members for the Kremlin's needs.)

During the Cold War years, the scope of Amtorg's enterprise was more limited, but it continued to conduct its business at 49 West 37th Street, in New York City, maintaining a skeleton staff. As an arm of the Soviet state, Amtorg, at that time located at 355 Lexington Avenue in New York City, was targeted in two bombing attempts, in 1971 and 1976, by members of the Jewish Armed Resistance, an extremist group affiliated with the Jewish Defense League.

Surrounded by continuing controversy, Amtorg survived the Cold War but did not survive the collapse of the Soviet Union, quietly disappearing in 1998. Its last address was on the 86th floor of the World Trade Center in New York City.

== Presidents of Amtorg ==
- Isay Khurgin (1924–1925), died under suspicious circumstances in a boating accident in upstate New York.
- Aleksei Vasil'evich Prigarin (1925–1926)
- Saul Bron (1927–1930), executed during the Great Purge in 1938
- Pyotr Bogdanov (1930–1934), executed during the Great Purge in 1938
- Ivan Vasilyevich Boev (1934–1936), executed during the Great Purge in 1938.
- David Aronovich Rozov (1936–1938), executed 28 Oct 1941, Barbysh
- Konstantin Lukashev (1939–1944)
- Mikhail Maksimovich Gusev (1944–1948) — identified in declassified Venona decrypts as Amtorg president under the cover name SVAT ("Matchmaker"); The New York Times reported his recall to Moscow in November 1946, and by 1949 A. V. Zakharov had succeeded him as president.
- Aleksey V. Zakharov (1948–1949)
- ???
- Nikolay Smelyakov (1958-1959)
- Sergey Malov (1963–1967)
- Vlas Nikiforovich Nichkov (1967–1972)
- Vladimir Bessmertny (1972–1977)
- Yuriy A. Kislenko (1978–1983)
- Yuri Mashkin (1989–1993)

== Employees of Amtorg ==
- Grace Lumpkin
- Esther Shemitz
- Hede Massing (Soviet spy)
- Valentin Markin (Soviet rezident)
- Walter Grinke (Soviet rezident and known to Whittaker Chambers and Elizabeth Bentley as "Bill")
- Nicholas Dozenberg (Soviet spy)
- Valentine Burtan (Soviet spy)
- Boris Bykov (Soviet rezident)
- Manfred Stern (Soviet rezident)
- Morris Cohen

== See also ==
- Foreign Trade of the Soviet Union
- Economy of the Soviet Union
- Soviet Government Purchasing Commission in the U.S.
- Soviet Bureau (NYC)
- ARCOS (London)

== External sources ==
- Richard B. Spence, "Death in the Adirondacks: Amtorg, Intrigue, and the Dubious Demise of Isaiya Khurgin and Efraim Sklyansky, August 1925," American Communist History, vol. 14, no. 2 (Aug. 2015), pp. 135–158.
- "Amtorg's Spree," TIME (February 19, 1940)
- "AMTORG President Returns to Russia to 'Resign' His Post," New York Times (November 16, 1946)
- "The Never-Ending Wrong," Atlantic Monthly (June 1977) by Katherine Anne Porter
- "Interview with Cecil Philips," PBS Red Files (1999)
- "Amtorg," PBS Red Files (1999)
- "Lend-Lease: The Oil Factor," Oil of Russia (2005)
- "Soviet Amtorg Trading Corp," Electric History (undated)
- NYT search 'Amtorg'
- Melnikova-Raich, Sonia (2010). "The Soviet Problem with Two 'Unknowns': How an American Architect and a Soviet Negotiator Jump-Started the Industrialization of Russia, Part I: Albert Kahn". IA, The Journal of the Society for Industrial Archeology. 36 (2): 57–80. ISSN 0160-1040. JSTOR 41933723.; Melnikova-Raich, Sonia (2011). "The Soviet Problem with Two 'Unknowns': How an American Architect and a Soviet Negotiator Jump-Started the Industrialization of Russia, Part II: Saul Bron". IA, The Journal of the Society for Industrial Archeology. 37 (1/2): 5–28. ISSN 0160-1040. JSTOR 23757906. (abstract)
- Foreign Relations of the United States, 1949, Eastern Europe; The Soviet Union, Volume V
