= Samuel Krafsur =

American journalist

Samuel Simon Krafsur
- Born: January 10, 1913; Boston, Massachusetts
- Died: June 1, 1983 (aged 70); St. Petersburg, Florida
- Education: Northeastern University
- Known for: Communist Party of America; Abraham Lincoln Brigade
- Military Career
- Allegiance: Spanish Republic
- Branch: International Brigades
- Unit: The "Abraham Lincoln" XV International Brigade
- Conflicts: Spanish Civil War

Samuel Simon Krafsur (January 10, 1913 – June 1983) was a Boston-born journalist who worked for the Soviet news agency TASS during World War II. He was also known as Bill Krafsur.

== Biography ==
Krafsur was mentioned in the Venona intercepts under the codename IDE. He was used by the NKVD during the war as a source of information and for recruiting journalists as informants and agents, and is referred to in the NSA archives as a "KGB agent"^{1}.

In the 1930s Krafsur joined the Communist Party of America. He attended Northeastern University for a year. He lived at 68 Phillips Street in Boston before going to Spain to fight with the Abraham Lincoln Brigade during the Spanish Civil War, where he was wounded in 1937.

In 1938 Krafsur was a member of the editorial staff of "The Volunteers for Liberty" a newspaper which was an, "organ of the Veterans of the Abraham Lincoln Brigade" organization out of 125 West 45 Street in New York City. In April 1938 he was in charge of finding veterans to tell their war stories to be made into radio plays written by Irwin Shaw.

He began working for TASS in 1941 after being recruited by the Soviet agent Vladimir Pravdin. He became the assistant to the manager Laurence Todd at the Washington sub-bureau. Krafsur was considered an important asset to the NKVD because of the many contacts he had with other newsmen. He was the deputy TASS bureau chief in Washington, D.C., and the FBI spent a lot of time and effort trying to identify who he was under his codename IDE.

In May 1944, he was described in a NKVD cable from New York to Moscow as, "absolutely devoted to the USSR." He provided at least twenty leads of people for possible recruitment including Joseph Berger, a personal aide to the chairman of the Democratic National Committee, and I. F. Stone.

In 1949, Laurence Todd was relieved of his managing duties and instead given the title of senior correspondent. In this same year Krafsur left TASS and was later called before the House Committee on Un-American Activities where he chose not to cooperate. Later he worked in a toy store.

In the early 1960s he married the ex-wife of the secretary-treasurer of the Mine, Mill, and Smelters Union. He died, at the age of seventy, in St. Petersburg, Florida in 1983 under the name "Samuel Krafsur".

== Note ==
- ^1 National Security Agency Archives , National Cryptological Museum, Custodian of documents for the Army Signals Intelligence Corp

== Sources ==
- John Earl Haynes; Harvey Klehr (2000). Venona: Decoding Soviet Espionage in America. Yale University Press. pp. 242–244, 248. ISBN 978-0-300-12987-8.
- Nigel West (2013). MORTAL CRIMES – The Greatest Theft in History: The Soviet Penetration of the Manhattan Project. Enigma Books. ISBN 978-1-929631-29-2.
- Social Security Death Index, USA.
