= Massing (surname) =

Massing is a surname. Notable people with the surname include:

- Benjamin Massing (1962-2017), Cameroonian footballer
- Hede Massing (1900-1981), Austrian actress
- Michael Massing (21st century), American essayist
- Paul Massing (1902-1979), German sociologist
- Rune Massing (born 1980), Dutch badminton player
