= Gosproektstroi =

Gosproektstroi (Russian: Госпроектстрой, IPA: [ˌɡosprɐˌɛktˈstroj]; 1930–1932) was the State Design and Construction Bureau in Moscow, Soviet Union (Union of Soviet Socialist Republics). This organization was set up in 1930 following an agreement between Saul G. Bron, President of Amtorg Trading Corporation, on behalf of the Superior Soviet of the People's Economy (VSNKh) of the USSR, and Albert Kahn, the leading American industrial architect from Detroit, Michigan, for his firm to become consulting architects for all industrial construction in the Soviet Union.

Albert Kahn Associates agreed to establish an office with its architects and engineers in Moscow, to train Soviet architects and engineers, as well as supervise design of industrial facilities under the nation's first five-year plan.

Moritz Kahn, an engineer and one of the three Kahn brothers in Kahn Associates, was selected to set up this office. He said:

"In a short time I shall proceed to Moscow with a staff of twenty-five specialist assistants. We shall then help the Soviet Government to organize a designing bureau, which will comprise about forty-five hundred architectural and engineering designers, selected principally from Soviet Russia, but also from America and other foreign countries. The bureau will be directed by the head of the Building Commission of the Supreme Economic Council."

George Scrymgeour, another American from Albert Kahn Associates, was appointed as head of Gosproektstroi and also sat on the National Technical Soviet. The Kahn company was ultimately responsible for supervising 3,000 designers across the Soviet Union in Dnipropetrovsk, Kharkov, Kiev, Leningrad, Novosibirsk, Odessa and Sverdlovsk, all controlled from Moscow. They trained some 4000 specialists and had a budget of 417 million rubles.

State planning permitted standardization of building construction: "all factory buildings for any one type of construction can be built on standardized principles. The result will be a great saving in time and in cost in the preparation of plans and the cost of buildings," as Moritz Kahn said. He believed that the Soviet building code permitted a "saving of millions of dollars per annum because of the ultra-conservative character of that code."
