= Massing (disambiguation) =

Massing is an architectural term.

Massing may also refer to:

- Massing (surname)
- Massing, Germany, municipality in Rottal-Inn, Bavaria, Germany
