= The Book of Saladin =

1998 novel by Tariq Ali

- Author: Tariq Ali
- Publisher: Verso
- Publication date: 1998
- Media type: Print
- Pages: 367 pp
- ISBN: 978-1-85984-834-0
- Preceded by: Fear of Mirrors
- Followed by: Snogging Ken

The Book of Saladin is a historical novel by Pakistani-born British writer Tariq Ali, first published in 1998. The second in Ali’s Islam Quintet, the narrative purports to be the memoir of the 12th-century Muslim leader Saladin, or Salah al-Din, who famously captured Jerusalem from the Crusaders in 1187.

== Synopsis ==
Written as part memoir by Saladin and part biography by Jewish scribe Ibn Yakub, who is given permission to interview the great man’s wife and close associates, the novel tells the story of Salah al-Din, a Kurdish warrior who became a hero of the Muslim world due to his heroics against the Crusaders and was made Sultan of Egypt and Syria as a reward. Parallels are drawn between the Egypt and Syria of the Middle Ages and the Middle East of the present day, with all of the disagreements and strife so familiar today.

== Reviews ==
- https://www.kirkusreviews.com/book-reviews/tariq-ali/the-book-of-saladin/
- https://www.goodreads.com/book/show/184304.The_Book_of_Saladin
- http://www.historicalnovels.info/Book-of-Saladin.html
