= Der Gegner =

German arts magazine, 1919–1922

Der Gegner ("The Opponent") was a German arts magazine published between April 1919 and 27 September 1922. It was edited by Julian Gumperz, and Karl Otten. It was published in Halle by Franz Joest Verlag. Wieland Herzfelde replaced Otten on the editorial board in 1920.

== Featured writers ==
- Raoul Hausmann
- Ludwig Rubiner
- Thea Schnittke
- Hermann Schüller
- Karl August Wittfogel
