= Ignace Reiss =

Soviet spy (1899–1937)

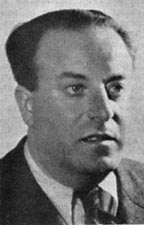
- Ignace Reiss
- Born: Nathan Markovic Poreckij; 1899; Podwołoczyska (Pidvolochysk), then in Galicia, Austria-Hungary
- Died: 4 September 1937 (aged 37 or 38); Lausanne, Switzerland
- Cause of death: Assassination by gunshot
- Education: Faculty of Law, University of Vienna
- Occupation: Spy
- Spouse: Elsa Bernaut (a.k.a. "Else Bernaut" a.k.a. "Elisabeth K. Poretsky" a.k.a. "Elsa Reiss")
- Children: 1 son
- Awards: Order of the Red Banner
- Espionage activity
- Allegiance: Soviet Union
- Service years: 1919–1937
- Codename: Ignace Reiss; Ignatz Reiss; Ignace Poretsky; Ludwik; Ludwig; Hans Eberhardt; Steff Brandt; Walter Scott

Ignace Reiss (1899 – 4 September 1937) – also known as "Ignace Poretsky," "Ignatz Reiss," "Ludwig," "Ludwik", "Hans Eberhardt," "Steff Brandt," Nathan Poreckij, and "Walter Scott (an officer of the U.S. military intelligence)" – was one of the "Great Illegals" or Soviet spies who worked in third party countries where they were not nationals in the late 1920s and 1930s. He was known as a nevozvrashchenec ("unreturnable").

An NKVD team assassinated him on 4 September 1937 near Lausanne, Switzerland, a few weeks after he declared his defection in a letter addressed to Joseph Stalin. He was a lifelong friend of Walter Krivitsky; his assassination influenced the timing and method of Whittaker Chambers's defection a few months later.

== Background ==
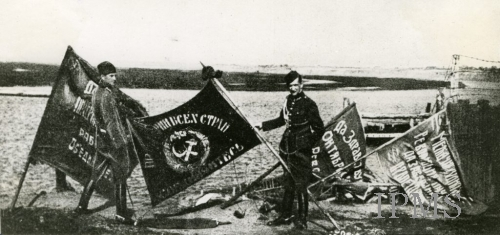
Reiss's brother died in the Polish–Soviet War in 1920 (here, Polish soldiers display captured Soviet battle flags after the Battle of Warsaw)

Reiss was born Nathan Markovich Poreckij in 1899 in Podwołoczyska (today Pidvolochysk), then in Galicia, Austria-Hungary (now Ukraine). He was a Lithuanian Jew

Their father had Nathan and Nathan's elder brother educated in Lwow (now Lviv), the provincial capital. There, he formed lifelong friendships with several other boys, all of whom would become committed Communist spies. These included Kalyniak, Willy Stahl, Berchtold Umansky ("Brun"), his brother Mikhail Umansky ("Misha," later "Ilk"), Fedia (later "Fedin"), and the young Walter Krivitsky (born Samuel Ginsberg).

During World War I, the friends traveled when they could to Vienna, where they gathered around Fedia and his girlfriend Krusia. The name Krusia (also "Kruzia") became a codename between these friends in later years. Reiss also visited Leipzig, Germany, to meet, fatefully, German Socialist Gertrude Schildbach, who would later conspire in his assassination. He earned a degree from the Faculty of Law, University of Vienna.

== Career ==
In 1918, Reiss returned to his hometown, where he worked for the railway. His older brother was killed during the Polish-Soviet War in 1920.

=== Fourth Department: "Ludwig" ===
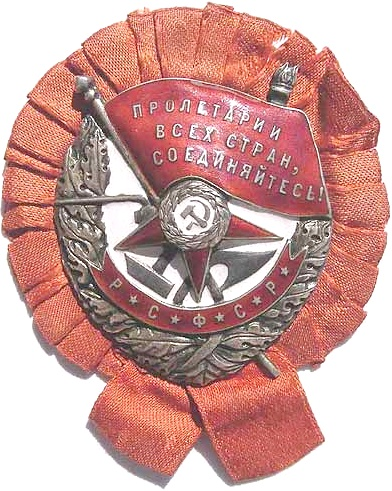
Reiss received the Order of the Red Banner (here, first variant, on red cloth (1918–1924))

In early 1919, Reiss joined the newly formed Polish Communist Party (the Communist Workers' Party of Poland or KPRP), since his hometown had become part of the Second Polish Republic. The KPRP adhered closely to the policies of Rosa Luxemburg. Julian Marchlewski (a.k.a. "Karski") represented the KPRP at the 1st Congress of the Comintern in March 1919.

By the summer of 1919, he had received a summons to Vienna, Austria, where he moved quickly from work with agencies of the newly formed Comintern to "Fourth Department of the General Staff"—which became the Soviet GRU. He then conducted party work in Poland. There he met Joseph Krasny-Rotstadt, a friend of both Rosa Luxemburg (already dead) and (more importantly) of fellow Pole Felix Dzerzhinsky. Having fought in the Bolshevik Revolution, Krasny was already directing propaganda for Eastern Europe. During this time, Reiss published a few articles as "Ludwig" in one of Krasny's publications, called The Civil War.

In early 1920, Reiss was in Moscow, where he met and married his wife, Elisabeth (also "Elsa"). During the Russian-Polish War in 1920, Willy Stahl and he received their first assignment, Lwow, where they distributed illegal Bolshevik literature. By 1921, as he took on the alias "Ludwig" (or "Ludwik" in his wife's memoirs), Reiss had become a Soviet spy, originally for the GPU/OGPU, and later the NKVD. In 1922, he was again working in Lwow, this time with another friend of Fedia and Krusia's from Vienna, Jacob Locker. Elisabeth was in Lwow, too. Reiss was arrested and charged with espionage, which carried a maximum five-year sentence. En route to prison, Reiss escaped his train in Kraków, never to return to Poland.

From 1921 to 1929, Reiss served in Western Europe, particularly Berlin and Vienna. In Berlin, their house guests included Karl Radek and Larissa Reisner, ex-wife of Fedor Raskolnikov (a Naval officer who chronicled the Kronstadt rebellion).

In Vienna, friends included Yuriy Kotsiubynsky, Alexander Schlichter, and Angelica Balabanov. In Amsterdam, Reiss and his wife knew Henriette Roland-Holst, Hildo Krop, Princess Juliana of the Netherlands, "H. C. Pieck" (Henri Pieck), and most importantly "Henricus" or "Henryk Sneevliet" (Henk Sneevliet). During this same period, Richard Sorge brought Hede Massing to Reiss for training.

In 1927, he returned briefly to Moscow, where he received the Order of the Red Banner. From 1929 to 1932, Reiss served in Moscow, where he worked in the Polish section of the Comintern—already sidelined as "foreign" (non-Russian). Among the people whom Reiss and wife knew at that time were Richard Sorge (a.k.a. "Ika"), Sorge's superior, Alexander Borovich, Felix Gorski, Otto Braun, Max Maximov-Friedman, Franz Fischer, Pavlo Ladan, and Theodore Maly. Valentin Markin reported to Reiss in Moscow, who in turn reported to Abram Slutsky.

=== Break with Stalin and assassination (1937) ===
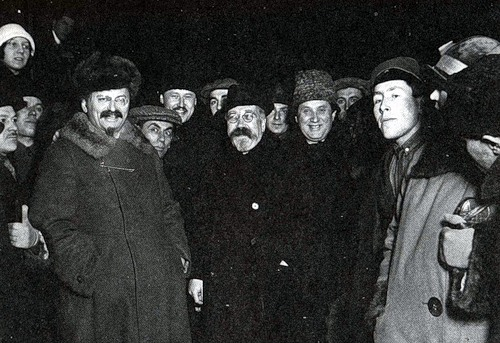
The Great Purge by Joseph Stalin of Bolshevik revolutionaries led Reiss to defect (here, Leon Trotsky, Lev Kamenev and Grigory Zinoviev, all marked either for assassination or execution

From 1932 to 1937, Reiss was stationed in Paris. There, Reiss and his wife met Egon Erwin Kisch, Alexander Rado, Noel Field, Vasily Zarubin, Boris Bazarov, and Yan Karlovich Berzin.

By 1936, their friends were returning to Moscow one after the other, most of whom were shot or disappeared during the Great Purge. Reiss himself received a summons back to Moscow but allowed his wife to travel there in his stead in late 1936, staying into early 1937. In early 1937, Krivitsky was recalled but managed to finagle his way out again on a foreign assignment.

Upon Krivitsky's return, Reiss composed a letter to the Central Committee of the Communist Party of the Soviet Union, addressed to Stalin and dated 17 July 1937. He returned the Order of the Red Banner with his letter, stating that to wear the medal "simultaneously with the hangmen of the best representatives of the Russian worker" was beneath his dignity. He went on to condemn the excesses of Stalin's purges and the actions of Soviet state security services. He also declared "I am joining Trotsky and the Fourth International". While criticizing Stalin and Yezhov, Reiss promised not to reveal any state security secrets.

Reiss then fled with his wife and child to the remote village of Finhaut, Valais canton, Switzerland, to hide. After they had been hiding for a month, Gertrude Schildbach contacted them. Schildbach acted on the instruction of Roland Lyudvigovich Abbiate, alias Francois Rossi, alias Vladimir Pravdin, codename LETCHIK ("Pilot"), a Russian expatriate, citizen of Monaco, and a Soviet NKVD agent. She refused a request by Abbiate to give Reiss a box of chocolates filled with strychnine but agreed to set up a meeting with him. On 4 September, Reiss agreed to meet Schildbach in Lausanne. His wife and son Roman boarded a train for Territet, Vaud canton, Switzerland. Reiss stayed with Schildbach and was then to board a train for Reims, France, to meet Sneevliet (who was to publish Reiss's letter and news of his defection). Then he was to rejoin his family in Territet. He never made it to his train to Reims.

As Reiss's wife relates in her memoirs, she went to Vevey to meet Schildbach again on September 5, but the woman never showed up. On September 6, she saw a small article in a Lausanne newspaper about a dead man with a Czech passport in the name of "Hans Eberhardt" found dead on the night of 4 September on the road from Lausanne to Chamblandes. She later identified the body carrying Eberhardt's passport as that of her husband.

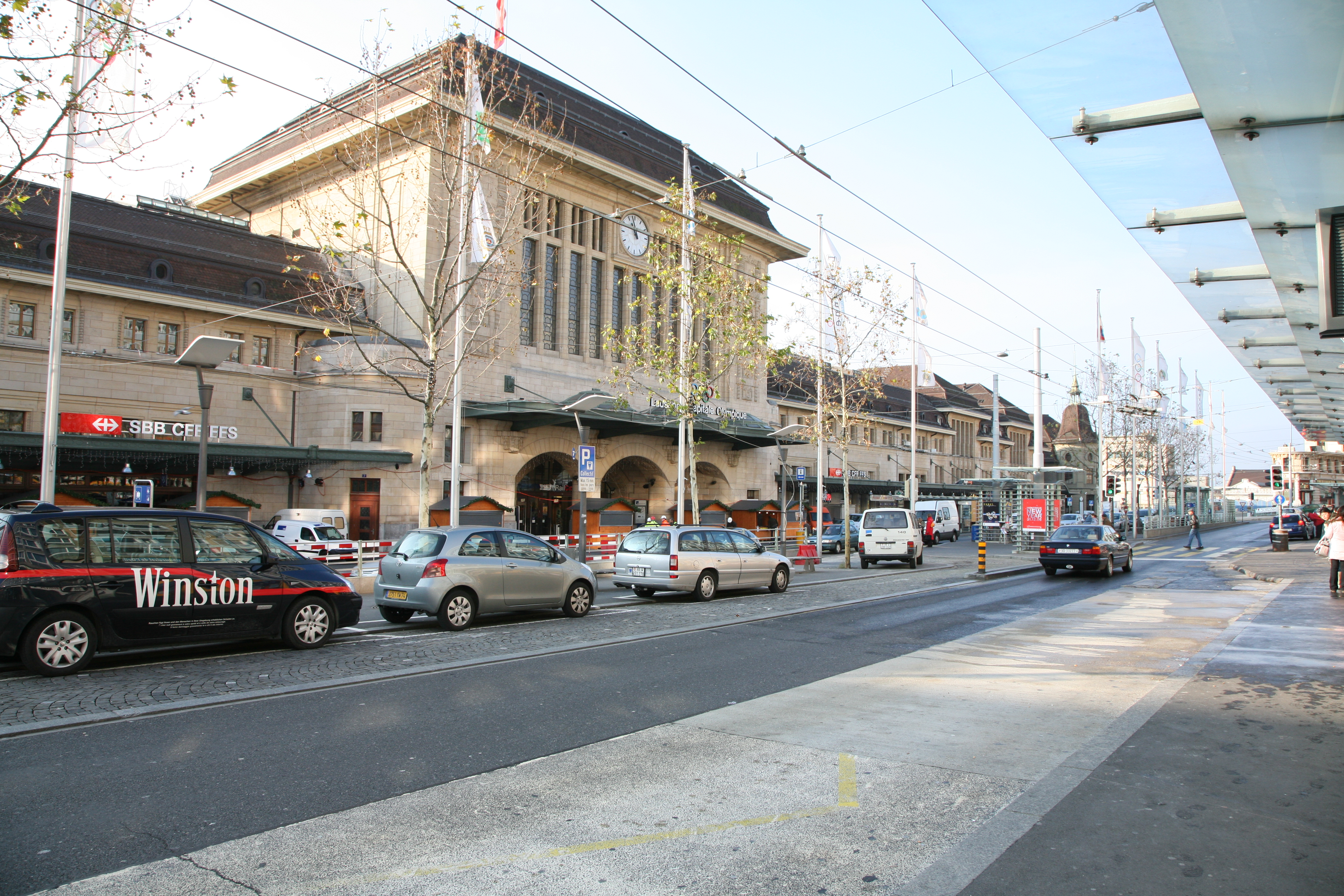
Lausanne railway station, where Reiss met Schildbach, who led him to his death

Reiss, then using the alias "Eberhardt", was lured by Schildbach onto a side road near Lausanne, where Roland Abbiate was waiting for him with a Soviet PPD-34 submachine gun. Realizing what was about to happen, Reiss lunged for Schildbach, grabbing a lock of her hair before Abbiate shot him. Reiss was hit by fifteen bullets from Abbiate's submachine gun, killing him instantly: he was found with five bullets in the head and seven in the body. The two then dumped Reiss's body on the side of the road.

Police investigations revealed that a long strand of grey hair was found clutched in the hand of the dead man. In his pockets were a passport in the name of Hans Eberhardt and a railway ticket for France. An American-brand automobile, abandoned on 6 September at Geneva, was found to contain abandoned clothing, which led to the identification of two men and a woman. One of the men was Roland Abbiate, who had registered on 4 September at the Hotel de la Paix in Lausanne with Schildbach, the two had fled without their baggage and without paying their bill. The woman was none other than Schildbach, of German nationality, a resident of Rome, and in reality a Soviet OGPU agent in Italy. The other man was Etienne-Charles Martignat, born in 1900 at Culhat in the Puy-de-Dôme, living since 1931 at No 18 Avenue de Anatole France, Clichy, Paris. Among the effects left by Schildbach at the hotel was a box of chocolates containing strychnine. Soon thereafter, a deposit in a Swiss bank was made in Gertrude Schildbach's name in the amount of 100,000 Swiss francs (but it is unknown whether Schildbach ever withdrew this money, as she was never seen again). However, as France's left-wing Popular Front Government of the period did not wish to upset diplomatic relations with the Soviet Union and Stalin, no arrests or announcement of the results of the police investigation were made at the time.

In a 1951 French Ministry of Interior study titled A Soviet Counter-espionage Network Abroad: the Reiss Case the French government analyzed the actions of Soviet state security forces involved in Reiss's abduction and assassination. Published on 20 September, the study concluded that "the assassination of Ignace Reiss on 4 September 1937 at Chamblandes near Lausanne, Switzerland, is an excellent example of the observation, surveillance and liquidation of a 'deserter' from the Soviet secret service". While Ignace Reiss could qualify as a victim of Soviet political repressions, he was never officially exonerated by the Soviet government because he was simply "liquidated" and never tried in a court.

== Aftermath ==
On the first anniversary of Reiss's assassination, his wife (as "Elsa Reiss") described their situation:

He would wait no longer, he had made up his mind. And now I tried to dissuade him from being over-impulsive, to talk things over with other comrades. I was justifiably afraid for his life. I pleaded with him not to walk out alone, to make the break along with other comrades but he only said: "One can count on nobody. One must act alone and openly. One cannot trick history, there is no point in delay." He was correct – one is alone.
It was a release for him but also a break with everything that had hitherto counted with him, with his youth, his past, his comrades. Now we were completely alone. In those few weeks Reiss aged very rapidly, his hair became snow-white. He who loved nature and cherished life looked about him with empty eyes. He was surrounded by corpses. His soul was in the cellars of the Lubianka. In his sleep-torn nights he saw an execution or a suicide.

== Personal life ==
Between 1920 and 1922, Reiss married Elsa Bernaut (a.k.a. "Else Bernaut", a.k.a. "Elisabeth K. Poretsky", a.k.a. "Elsa Reiss"; 1898–1976) in Moscow; at times, Reiss used her maiden name as another alias. (In French, her book received the title Les nôtres by "Elisabeth K. Poretski" in the Bibliothèque nationale de Paris and by "Elizaveta Poretskaya" in The Black Book of Communism.) They had one child, a boy named Roman, born around 1926.

== Legacy ==
=== 1952: Witness, by Whittaker Chambers ===
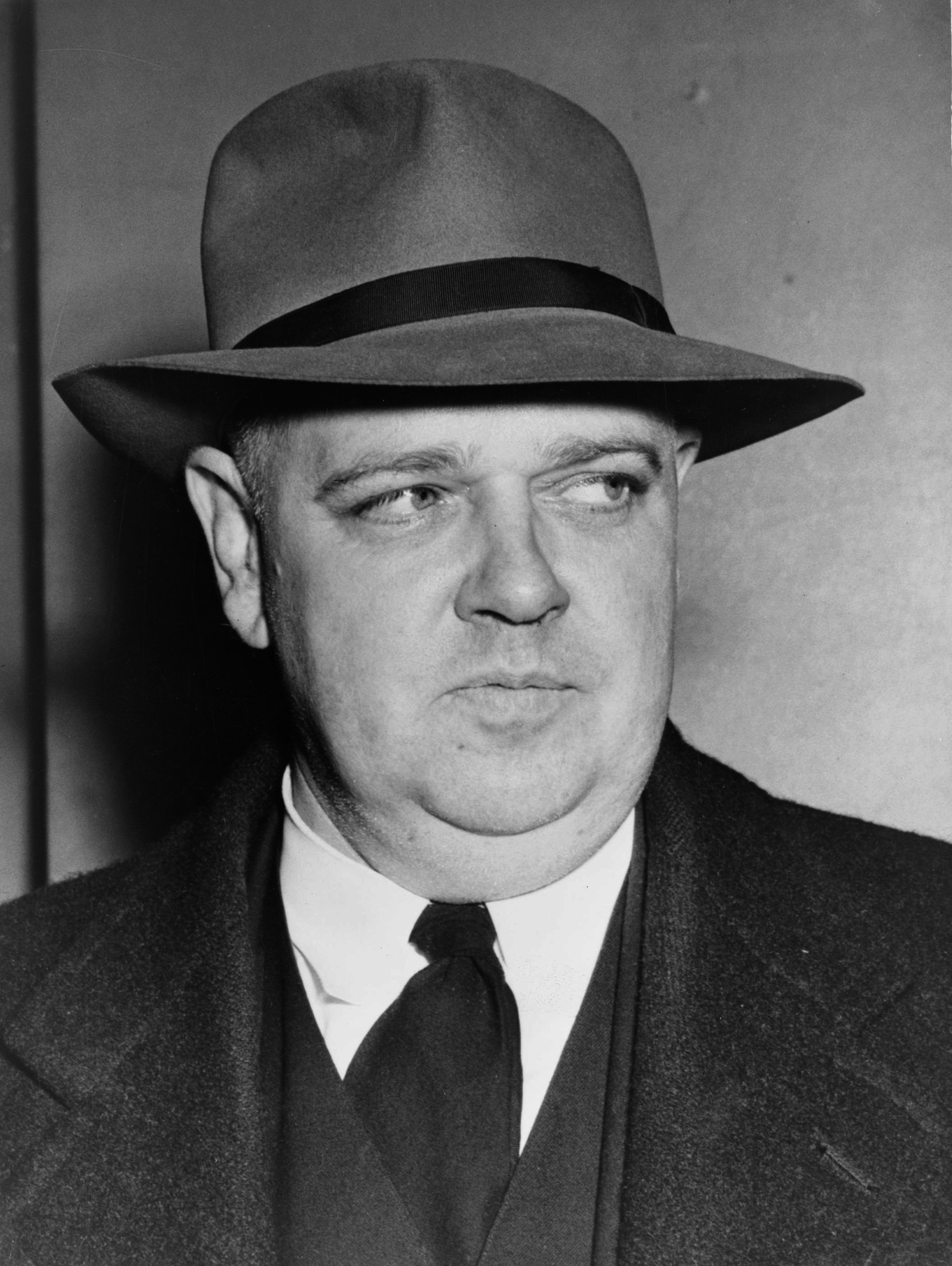
Whittaker Chambers (circa 1948) wrote about Reiss in his 1952 memoir Witness

Reiss appears in the 1952 memoirs of Whittaker Chambers, Witness: his assassination in July 1937 was perhaps the last straw that caused Chambers not only to defect but to make careful preparations when doing so:

Suddenly, revolutionists with a lifetime of devoted activity would pop out, like rabbits from a burrow, with the G.P.U. close on their heels—Barmine from the Soviet legation in Athens, Raskolnikoff from the Soviet legation in Sofia, Krivitsky from Amsterdam, Reiss from Switzerland. Not that Reiss fled. Instead, a brave and a lonely man, he sent his single-handed defiance to Stalin: Murderer of the Kremlin cellars, I herewith return my decorations and resume my freedom of action. But defiance is not enough; cunning is needed to fight cunning. It was foredoomed that sooner or later the door of a G.P.U limousine would swing open and Reiss's body with the bullets in the defiant brain would tumble out—as happened shortly after he deserted. Of the four I have named, only Barmine outran the hunters. Reiss's death moved me deeply.

Compared to Reiss, Chambers considered far more carefully how to elude the Soviets when he defected in April 1938, as described in Witness.

=== 1995: Ignace Reiss, by Daniel Kunzi ===
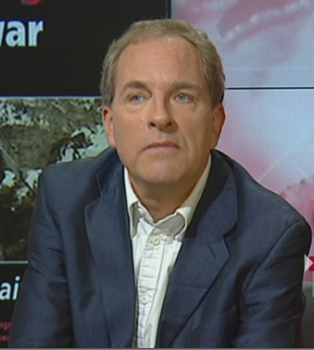
Daniel Kunzi (circa 2015) made a film documentary about Reiss

Swiss filmmaker Daniel Kunzi made a 53-minute documentary film called Ignace Reiss: Vie et mort d'un révolutionnaire about Reiss's life and death, following several years of research. The film includes testimonials, historical footage, a reconstruction of his assassination, all narrated by readings from his wife's memoirs. (Participating in the film are Vanessa Redgrave, who reads from adaptations of Elisabeth Poretsky's memoirs, and Gerard Rosenthal, who recounts his services as lawyer to both Leon Trotsky and Elisabeth Poretsky.)

=== 1998: Fear of Mirrors, by Tariq Ali ===
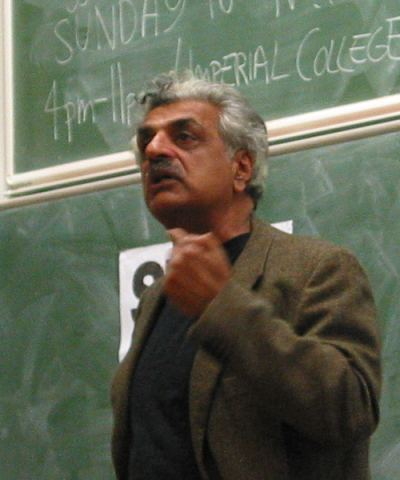
Tariq Ali (circa 2006) wrote a novel about Reiss

"Ludwik" forms the background history of Tariq Ali's 1998 novel Fear of Mirrors, set during German reunification in 1990. Ali was fascinated by the story of Ignace Reiss: "Ludwik became an obsession with me."

== See also ==
- Soviet defectors
- GRU
- NKVD
- Order of the Red Banner
- Great Purge
- Purges of the Communist Party of the Soviet Union
- Capital punishment
- Poison laboratory of the Soviet secret services
- Terrorism in Russia

=== Reiss's inner circle ===
- Walter Krivitsky
- Theodore Maly
- Elisabeth Poretsky
- Mikkhail Umansky ("Misha")
- Bertold Umansky ("Brun," "Ilk")
- Fedia ("Fedin," "Alfred Kraus")
- Willy Stahl

=== Reiss's assassins ===
- Nikolai Yezhov
- Sergey Spigelglas
- Vladimir Pravdin
- Gertrude Schildbach
- Renata Steiner
- Mark Zborowski
- Abram Slutsky

=== Reiss's outer circle ===
- Richard Sorge
- Alexander Ulanovsky
- Victor Serge
- Henri Pieck
- Henk Sneevliet
- Franz Fischer
- Valentin Markin
- Hede Massing
- Noel Field
- Isaiah Oggins
- Whittaker Chambers
- Alexander Gregory Barmine
