= Saul Bron =

Soviet trade representative

- Born: 25 January 1887; Odessa (Ukraine, Russian Empire)
- Died: 21 April 1938; Kommunarka shooting ground, USSR (burial place)
- Cause of death: Executed during Stalin's Great Purge
- Citizenship: USSR
- Spouse: Klara Azarievna Bron (Kholodovskaya) (1885-1945)
- Children: Lev Saulovich Bron; Miriam Saulovna Bron

Saul Grigorievich Bron (Saul G. Bron, S. G. Bron; Russian: Саул Григорьевич Брон), (25 January 1887, Odessa – 21 April 1938, Kommunarka, Butovo) was a Soviet trade representative in United States and Great Britain. He is best known as Chairman of Amtorg Trading Corporation in New York City (1927–1930) and Chairman of the All-Russian Co-operative Society (ARCOS) in London (1930–1931). He became a victim of Stalin's Great Purge and was executed on 21 April 1938. He was posthumously rehabilitated in 1956.

== Early years ==
Saul Grigorievich (Shoil Gershkovich) Bron was born 25 January 1887 in Odessa (Ukraine, Russian Empire), in a Jewish family. He graduated the Odessa gymnasium and began his higher education at the Kiev Institute of Commerce (now Kyiv National Economic University). From 1905 to 1907 he continued his education in Europe, where he studied the grain trade and earned a doctorate in economics from the University of Zurich. After his return to Ukraine, he participated in development of Jewish agricultural colonies in Kherson Gubernia and taught at Novopoltavka Jewish agricultural school.

== Political affiliation ==
As a student at Kiev Commercial Institute Bron was involved in the social-democratic movement, popular among secular Jews in Ukraine as a reaction to anti-Semitism in the Russian Empire. In 1913 became a member of the Jewish Social Democratic Labor Party of Ukraine; in 1918–1919 – socialist-federalist. In 1919 became a member of VKP(b), after the latter merged with the Jewish Communist Party (a split-off of the Jewish Social Democratic Labor Party).

== Professional career ==
In 1921 Bron became a member of the Central Executive Committee of Ukraine. In 1921–1923 he acted as commissioner for foreign trade of Ukrainian SSR and representative of the People's Commissariat of Trade and Industry of the RSFSR at the Council of People's Commissars of Ukraine; he was also a member of the Collegium of the People's Commissariat of Foreign Affairs of Ukraine.

After signing the contract for technical assistance in building the Nizhnii Novgorod (Gorky) Automobile Plant. Dearborn, Mich., 31 May 1929. Left to right, Valery I. Mezhlauk, Vice Chairman VSNKh of the USSR; Henry Ford; Saul G. Bron, President of Amtorg.

After formation of the USSR in 1922, Bron served on the Supreme Economic Council of the RSFSR (VSNKh). In 1924 he began work for the People's Commissariat of Trade and Industry of the RSFSR and was appointed Director of the Russian Bank for Foreign Trade (Roskombank, later Foreign Trade Bank of the USSR). In 1925–1926 he headed the Soviet grain exporting agency, Exportkhleb. (He was successor of the first President of the agency, Leonid Krasin.)

In 1926 Bron began his work for the People's Commissariat of Foreign Trade of the USSR (under A. I. Mikoyan), and in March 1927 was appointed chairman of Amtorg Trading Corporation in New York. Prior to the establishment of diplomatic relations between the U.S. and the USSR in 1933, Amtorg, technically a private corporation, served as a de facto trade delegation and a quasi-embassy of the USSR.

Bron was the third chairman of Amtorg. He replaced A. V. Prigarin (1925–1926) and was replaced by P. A. Bogdanov (1930–1934). Bron was the first president of Amtorg whose command of English enabled him to negotiate without the aid of interpreters (he was also fluent in German and French). His tenure (1927–1930) concurred with the introduction of the first five-year plan, and his role was to contract with major American companies to help build Soviet industrial infrastructure.

On 9 October 1928 and 24 May 1929 Bron signed two contracts with International General Electric (I.G.E.), which became a key element in carrying out the electrification plan of the Soviet Union (GOELRO). In Dearborn, Michigan, he negotiated the US$30m contract with the Ford Motor Company for assistance in building the first Soviet automobile plant (GAZ) near Nizhnii Novgorod (Gorky). This contract was signed on 31 May 1929 by Henry Ford and Peter E. Martin on behalf of the company, by Bron, representing Amtorg, and by V. I. Mezhlauk, representing VSNKh. An additional two-part US$40m contract for construction of the plant was signed with The Austin Company on 23 August and 30 October 1929.

On 8 May 1929 Bron signed an historic contract with the firm of the leading American industrial architect from Detroit, Albert Kahn, to design the first Soviet tractor plant in Stalingrad (now Volgograd). On 9 January 1930 he signed the second contract with Kahn for his firm to become consulting architects for all industrial construction in the Soviet Union. Under these contracts, during 1929–1932, Kahn's firm, at its headquarters in Detroit and the especially created design bureau in Moscow, Gosproektstroi, trained over 4,000 Soviet architects and engineers and designed over 500 plants and factories, including Chelyabinsk Tractor Plant and Uralmash plant in Sverdlovsk.

Among other American firms, commissioned by Bron to provide technical aid to the USSR, were Hugh L. Cooper (construction of the Dneproges Dam), Arthur G. McKee (design and construction of Magnitogorsk Metallurgical Plant), Freyn Engineering (Novokuznetsk Metallurgical Plant), DuPont de Nemours, Radio Corporation of America, and more than a hundred other companies.

In 1930 Bron was transferred to London, where he was appointed chairman of ARCOS and head of the USSR Trade Delegation in Great Britain. During 1930–1931 he negotiated and signed several large contracts with British firms, including Imperial Chemical Industries, Armstrong-Vickers, Associated British Machine Tool Makers, and Metropolitan-Vickers Electrical Company.

On 20 September 1931, on Stalin's initiative, the Politburo recalled Bron back to the USSR. He remained a member of the Collegium of the Commissariat of Foreign Trade and in 1933 was appointed Chairman of the Chamber of Commerce of the USSR. However, in 1935, he was demoted and given a job as a deputy to the head of the State publishing agency OGIZ, Mikhail P. Tomsky.

== Arrest and death ==
Bron was arrested on 25 October 1937. He was falsely accused of being a member of an anti-Soviet terrorist organization; of preparing, together with Tomsky, a terrorist act against Stalin; and of being an agent of British intelligence. After five months in Lubyanka prison, on 21 April 1938 he was tried in a closed session by the troika (the three-member Military Collegium of the Supreme Court of the USSR). He was sentenced to death and was executed the same day.

Bron was buried in a mass grave at Kommunarka shooting ground near Moscow, one of the sites of mass executions during Stalin's Great Terror in the 1930s–1950s. He was posthumously rehabilitated by the Military Collegium of the Supreme Court of the USSR on 25 April 1956.

== Family ==
From 1931 to 1937, Bron and his family resided in Moscow, at 2/20 Serafimovich Street, apt. No. 403, a newly built massive building across the river from the Kremlin, known as Dom pravitel'stva ("Government House"), the residence of the upper echelons of the Soviet hierarchy, described by Yuri Trifonov in his novel, House on the Embankment. After Bron's arrest, his wife, Klara Bron, was arrested too, and the children, son Lev and daughter Miriam, were evicted from the apartment and banished from Moscow.

Klara (Chaya) Azarievna Bron (Kholodovskaia) was born in 1885 in Uman, Kievskaya Gubernia. She worked as a researcher at the Institute of World Economy and World Politics, Moscow. Arrested in 1937 as a "family member of a traitor to the Motherland"; sentenced on 16 May 1938 by Special Council of the NKVD of USSR to 8 years at Akmolinsk labor camp No.17 for wives of "traitors of the Motherland" (ALZhIR) in Kazakhstan. She did not survive her term and died on 25 January 1945. She was rehabilitated in 1956.

== Notable works ==
Bron, Saul G. (1930). Soviet Economic Development and American Business: Results of the first year under five-year plan and further perspectives. H. Liveright. OCLC 587814.

== Main Sources ==
Melnikova-Raich, Sonia. "The Soviet Problem with Two 'Unknowns': How an American Architect and a Soviet Negotiator Jump-Started the Industrialization of Russia. Part I: Albert Kahn". IA, Journal of the Society for Industrial Archeology 36 (2): 57–80 (2010). ISSN 0160-1040. JSTOR 41933723. "Part II: Saul Bron". IA, Journal of the Society for Industrial Archeology 37 (1/2): 5–28 (2011). JSTOR 23757906. (abstract)

Rasstrel'nye spiski: Moskva, 1937–1941: "Kommunarka", Butovo: kniga pamiati zhertv politicheskikh repressii L. S. Eremina, A. B. Roginskii, eds. (2000). M: Memorial – Zven'ia (in Russian). ISBN 9785787000443 OCLC 78216573.

Khaustov V. N. (2011). Lubyanka: The Soviet elite on Stalin's Golgotha: 1937-1938: Stalin's archive: Documents and comments (in Russian). M.: Mezhdunarodnyi fond "Demokratiia". ISBN 9785895110270 OCLC 756897409.

Saul, Norman E. (2008). Historical Dictionary of United States-Russian/Soviet Relations. Scarecrow Press. p. 24. ISBN 9780810855373. OCLC 230802271.
