= Vladimir Pravdin =

KGB officer

Vladimir Sergeevich Pravdin, or Roland Jacques Claude Abbiate, codename LETCHIK ["Pilot"], (July 1, 1905 – August 2, 1962) was a senior NKVD officer and assassin working in Europe during the Great Terror.

He later became a senior Soviet intelligence officer in New York and Washington, DC where he oversaw several important Soviet agents, such as Harry Dexter White, Lauchlin Currie, and Judith Coplon.

== Biography ==
Pravdin was born in London, United Kingdom, on July 1, 1905, as Roland Jacques Claude Abbiate. He had an older sister, Mireille. His father, Louis Abbiate, was a musician from Monaco who had successful stints performing in London and La Scala in Milan. His mother, Marguerite Mandelstamm, was a Russian Jew from St. Petersburg. The family moved to St. Petersburg in 1911 when Abbiate accepted a position as professor in a conservatory in St. Petersburg.

He graduated from a gymnasium in 1919. He moved to Paris along with his parents during the Russian Revolution.

== Career ==
During the 1930s, Pravdin was involved in killings and kidnappings in Europe for the KGB, including the assassination of Ignace Reiss, a GRU officer who defected in 1937. Reiss was caught by the NKVD in Switzerland, where he was killed as an object lesson to potential defectors. Pravdin disappeared after the murder. Later, during World War II, he was a senior Soviet intelligence officer in New York and Washington, DC, where he served as a Soviet diplomat, Vladimir Sergeyvich Pravdin.

Later, in the United States, Pravdin operated under cover as the head of TASS News Agency from 1944 to 1945. Among Pravdin's contacts while serving in the United States were Judith Coplon, Josef Katz, and Josef Berger.

In Washington, Pravdin, posing as a TASS reporter, made the acquaintance of such people as the famous correspondent Walter Lippmann and others. On one occasion, he met with a person with three children to offer money for certain unspecified information and who was code-named by the KGB as BLIN ("bliny" is Russian for "pancake"). In the plain language of the cable decrypt, BLIN was willing to provide information but declined to cooperate with the NKVD because the approach had been clumsy, but left open the possibility of future cooperation.

From scraps of information about BLIN that arose from the brief breaking of the Russian code in the materials the U.S. known as the Venona project, the FBI concluded that BLIN "appears" to be I.F. Stone. However, Stone biographer Myra MacPherson has contended that the FBI was uncertain about whether BLIN was, in fact, Stone. She noted that unlike Stone, BLIN was identified as someone "whose true pro-Soviet sympathies were not known to the public...." The FBI also considered the possibility of Ernest K. Lindley, who better fit the profile of a "very prominent journalist" and/like Stone (and BLIN) had three children. Another cable indicated that BLIN was afraid of contact with Pravdin, lest he draw the attention of J. Edgar Hoover. Stone was already attacking Hoover frequently in 1943, and the FBI was of the view that "Stone is known to the bureau because of his hostile editorial comments made against the FBI as early as 1936."

In 1945, while he was serving as a senior adviser to the American delegation at the founding conference of the United Nations, Assistant Secretary of the U.S. Treasury Harry Dexter White met with Pravdin and answered a series of questions about U.S. negotiating strategy and possible ways for Moscow to defeat or water down American postwar proposals. Pravdin left the United States and returned to the Soviet Union on 11 March 1946.

According to Vasiliy Mitrokhin, the reorganization of Soviet foreign intelligence in 1947 into the Committee of Information (KI) resulted in a reduction in staff. Pravdin was removed from intelligence work without explanation, even though he had been awarded the Order of the Red Star for his work in the United States. His removal from the service was a difficult blow, and he was anxious about the lack of trust shown to him.

In January 1948, he was hired as an editor at a publisher of foreign-language literature. In May 1953, Soviet intelligence briefly invited him back for intelligence work; however, that lasted only two months, and he was again laid off due to staff reductions. After that, he struggled to cope; he suffered from insomnia but was no longer allowed to visit the hospital reserved for Soviet intelligence personnel. His weight fell to 46 kg.

Anatoliy Golitsyn, another Soviet defector in the 1960s, claimed that Pravdin was active in Austria after World War II and often passed as a Frenchman. Golitsyn's claims are not supported by evidence.

== Personal life and death ==
Pravdin's wife, Olga Pravdina, also served in the KGB.

According to Mitrokhin, Pravdin's aged mother still lived in Paris, but he was forbidden from receiving any information from her after his removal from the intelligence service. Soviet officers passed his letters to his mother only occasionally. When he insisted on contacting her, he was arrested. His health and anxiety led him to commit suicide on 2 August 1962.
