= Henri Pieck =

Dutch architect and artist (1895–1972)

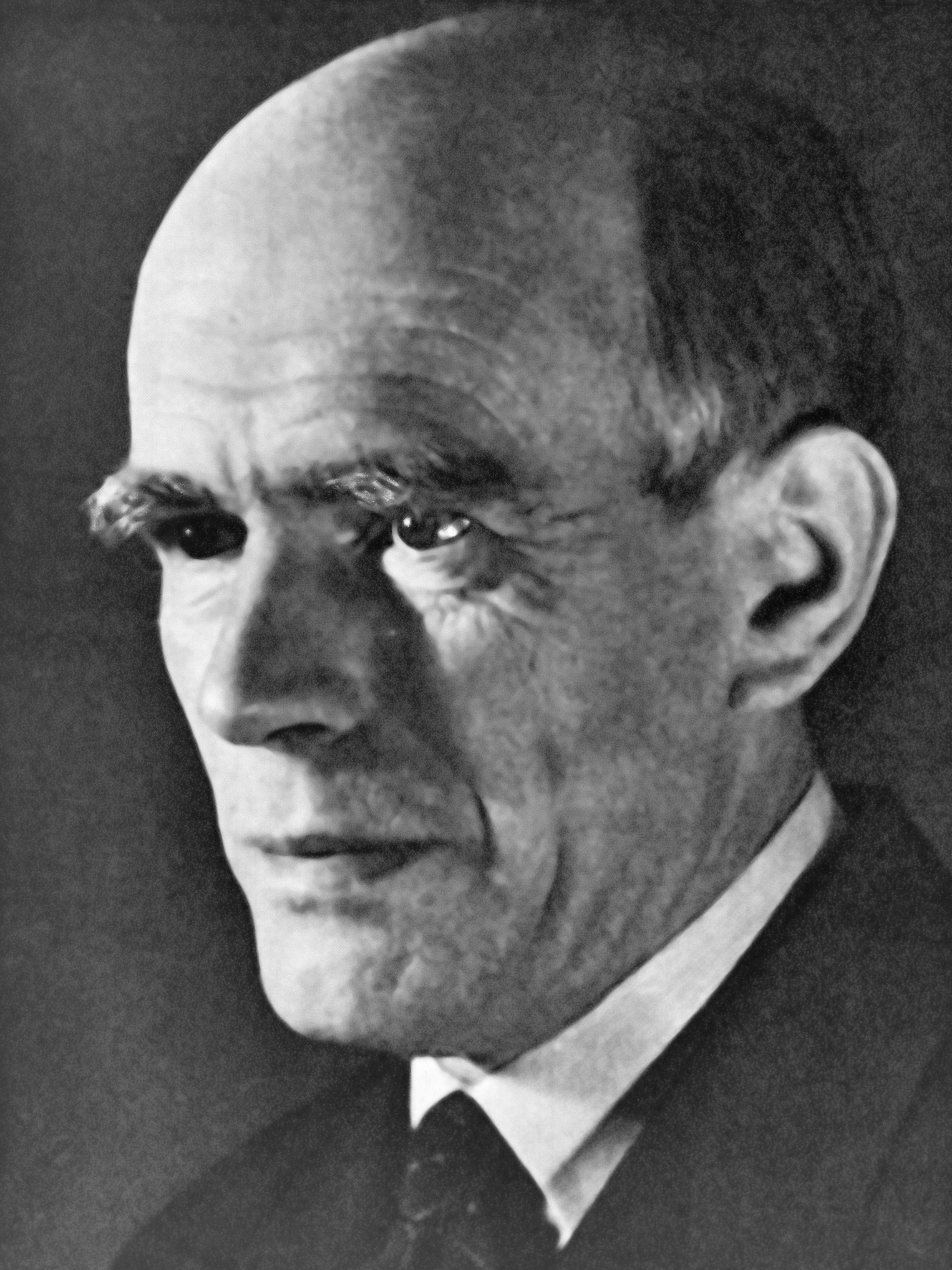
Henri Pieck (1946)̇

Henri Christiaan Pieck (19 April 1895 – 12 January 1972) was a Dutch architect, painter and graphic artist.

Pieck was born in Den Helder. He married twice. On 12 July 1922, he married Geziena van Gelder, with whom he had one son. This union was dissolved on 14 May 1928. His second wife, Bernharda Hugona Johanna van Lier, whom he married on 25 May 1928 in St. Giles, England, bore him two daughters. Pieck was the twin brother of Anton Franciscus Pieck, another Dutch painter and graphic artist. Pieck died in The Hague.

== Political activity ==
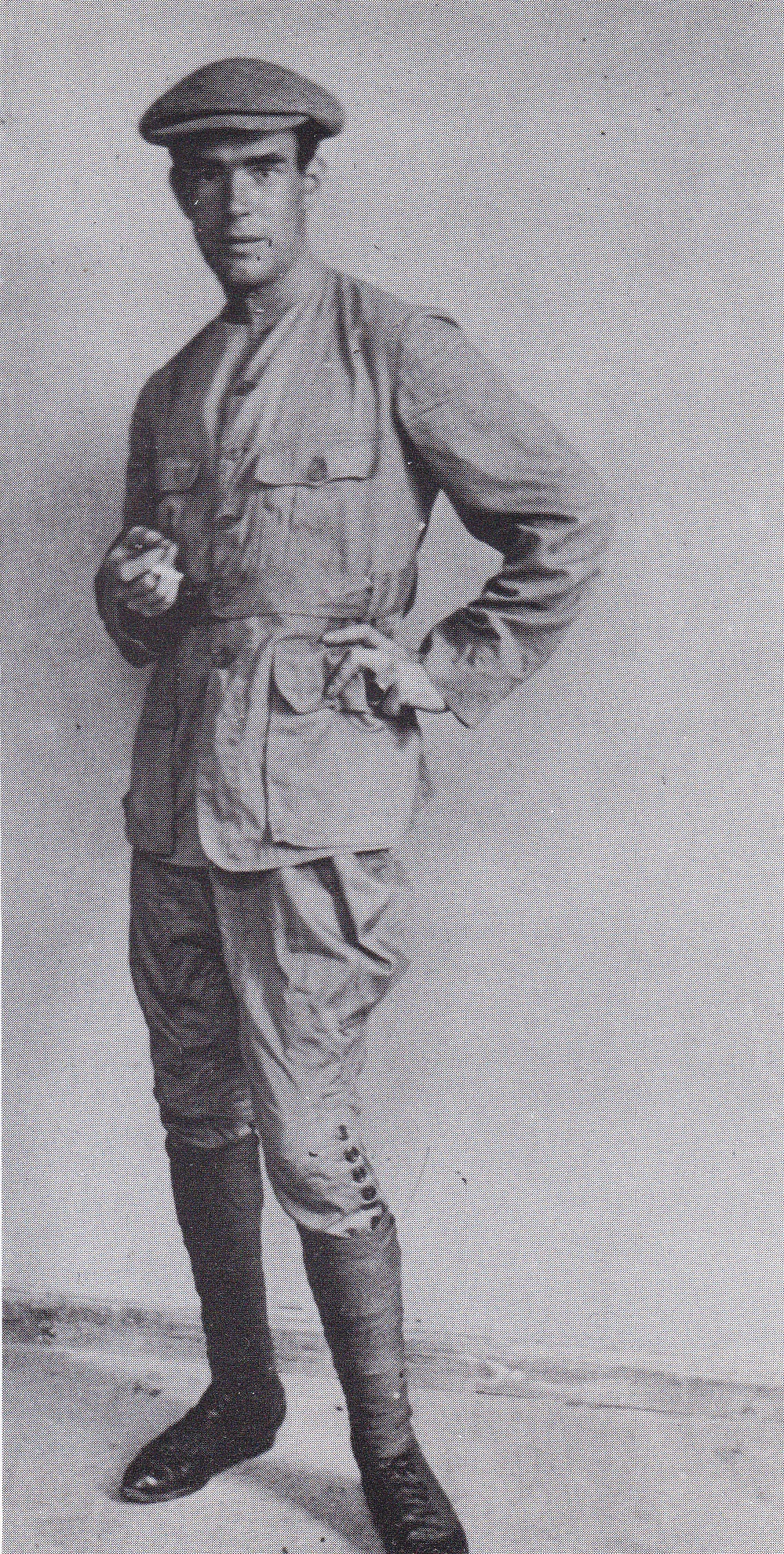
Han Pieck in Egypt (1920)

During the 1930s, Pieck operated as an agent for Soviet intelligence under Ignace Reiss. During this time he cultivated friendship with several British Foreign Office clerks, including Captain John H King, who handed over to Pieck many telegrams, code books and other Foreign Office correspondence.

After being arrested on 9 June 1941 for resistance activities, Pieck spent the rest of World War II in German custody, first in the "Oranjehotel" (a detention center used at the beginning of the war by the Dutch as a POW camp that was later taken over by the Germans), after which he was deported to Buchenwald via the Nazi transit camp in Amersfoort.

Pieck was assigned to the "Never-Never Shipment", sparing him from being killed at Auschwitz because of SS officials' desire to have him produce paintings that they could sell to their acquaintances for high prices.

== Sources ==
- Kogon, Eugen (1950). The Theory and Practice of Hell: The German Concentration Camps and the System Behind Them. New York: Farrar, Straus & Co. p. 88. ISBN 0-425-07761-6.
