= Paul Massing =

German sociologist (1902–1979)

Paul Wilhelm Massing (30 August 1902 – 30 April 1979) was a German sociologist.

== Life and career ==
Born in Grumbach in the Rhine Province, he attended school in Cologne, and later studied economics and social sciences at Frankfurt University, when Franz Neumann was there and at Cologne Handelshochschule (a business college). He graduated in 1926 as a Diplom-Kaufmann (MBA). A year later, he studied for one term at the Sorbonne in Paris and prepared his dissertation on agrarian conditions of France in 19th century and the agrarian program of the French socialist parties. In 1928, he returned to Frankfurt University to study with Wilhelm Gerloff and attained a doctorate with his thesis.

In January 1928, Paul Massing met Julian Gumperz and his wife Hede Gumperz. It was not long before Hede had fallen in love with Massing: "My relationship with Paul grew like something so natural and so completely uncontrollable that it is almost impossible to recall how it started. Its beginning is clouded and veiled, as is, I suppose, the beginning of all great passions; something that should not be probed or searched for, but left complete and untouched as in sacred keeping."

From Frankfurt Massing, followed by his future wife Hede (then, Hede Gumperz), a longtime communist and recently recruited Soviet spy, went to Moscow, where he worked until 1931 at the International Agrarian Institute. When he returned to Germany in 1931, Paul Massing was active with the illegal Antimilitärischer Apparat (AM-Apparat) of the Communist Party of Germany (KPD) in Berlin. He also helped his later wife with her GRU work. In 1933, Massing was arrested by the National Socialists under the Enabling Act. Freed by an amnesty after five-month solitary confinement in Sachsenhausen, Massing wrote his autobiographic novel Schutzhäftling 880, published in 1935 under his pseudonym Karl Billinger, dedicated to all comrades in concentration camps. In the United States, this book was published in part in the New Masses. Massing continued to write about Hitler insisting that Hitler is no Fool!.

After his release, he left Germany for Paris and then the United States, but was sent back to Germany and other European countries from time to time to work for the communist resistance. Time spent in Joseph Stalin's Moscow and barely survived led to the later strong criticism of Soviet communism. In spite of this experience, the couple "continued to render modest assistance" to Soviet intelligence during the years of World War II.

Back in the U.S., the Massings lived in an old farmhouse Quakertown, Pennsylvania. When the FBI questioned Hede Massing about Gerhart Eisler, her first husband from 1919 to 1923, who had been an illegal immigrant and an agent for the Comintern to the U.S. in the 1930s, but was now (from 1941) a legal refugee, both began slowly to confess their Soviet work. Hede's memoir of their life in Communist intelligence, This Deception was published in 1951. It shows the hardships they had had to endure and their strange life working first for the GRU and later, the KGB. Paul Massing later left Hede for sociologist Herta Herzog.

In 1942, Massing worked at the Institute of Social Research at Columbia University in New York. In August 1942, Paul Massing notified NKVD that his friend, Franz Neumann, had recently joined the Office of Strategic Services. Massing reported to Moscow that Neumann had told him that he had produced a study of the Soviet economy for the OSS's Russian Department. In April 1943, Elizabeth Zarubina met with Neumann: "(Zarubina) met for the first time with (Neumann) who promised to pass us all the data coming through his hands. According to (Neumann), he is getting many copies of reports from American ambassadors ... and has access to materials referring to Germany."

From 1948 and for many years, Paul Massing taught political sociology at Rutgers University in New Jersey. His most important work is Rehearsal for Destruction: A Study Of Political Anti-Semitism in Imperial Germany (1950), which was translated into German by Felix Weil and published in 1959 as Vorgeschichte des politischen Antisemitismus ('Prehistory of Political Anti-Semitism') with a preface by Max Horkheimer and Theodor Adorno. In 1977, he returned to Grumbach with Herta Herzog-Massing, but had only two years to live. He is buried at the family plot at Grumbach.

== Bibliography ==
=== As Karl Billinger ===
- All Quiet in Germany (1935) UK title
- Fatherland (1935) (foreword by Lincoln Steffens US title.
- Hitler is No Fool (1939)

=== As Paul W. Massing ===
- Rehearsal for Destruction: A Study of Political Antisemitism in Imperial Germany (1949, 1967)
