= Kitty Harris =

Soviet spy

- Born: Catherine or Katherine Harris; Unknown, perhaps 25 May 1899? London, Ontario
- Died: 6 October 1966; Gorky, Soviet Union
- Citizenship: Canadian; Soviet (1937)
- Organization(s): Industrial Workers of the World, Communist Party of the USA, Communist Party of the USSR, Comintern
- Agent(s): OGPU, NKVD
- Known for: espionage
- Spouse: Earl Browder (unconfirmed)
- Parent(s): Natan Harris, Esther Adamstein Harris
- Relatives: Siblings: Leah, Nancy, Abraham, Alice, Elizabeth, Hyman, Lillian, Tillie, Ida, Jessie

Kitty Harris (died 6 October 1966) was a Canadian-born Soviet secret agent and "long-time special courier of the OGPU-NKVD foreign intelligence during the 1930s and 1940s." Although mentioned by name in Walter Krivitsky’s book I was Stalin’s agent, Harris was identified only in 2001 when her code name "Ada" or "Aida" was found in declassified files from the Venona project. This was a counterintelligence program initiated by the United States Army's Signal Intelligence Service (later the National Security Agency) that ran from February 1, 1943 until October 1, 1980.

== Career ==
Catherine (the earliest spelling is Katherine) Harris was born to a poor Polish Jewish family, probably in London, Ontario, sometime between 1893 and 1902. Her father was a shoemaker from Białystok, in the Grodno Governorate of the Russian Empire (present-day Poland). The family migrated to Winnipeg, Canada in 1904-1905. She began to work, first in a cigar factory, then in a clothing factory as a seamstress in 1912. She joined the Industrial Workers of the World (IWW or "Wobblies") union and was a leader of the 1919 Winnipeg General Strike. Between 1919 and 1923, Harris moved with her family to Chicago.

In Chicago, Harris became secretary of the Amalgamated Clothing Workers local. She joined the Communist Party of the USA by January 1923. In 1925, Harris may have married Earl Browder, a prominent CPUSA functionary and later party leader. Harris transferred to the Communist Party of the USSR in 1927. A year later, she visited Shanghai, China, with Browder: there, he became secretary of the Pan-Pacific Trade Union Secretariat, (part of the Comintern) and she became a courier. She followed Browder to Moscow in 1929, where he reported for "special work". Harris returned to the USA and worked for the American Negro Labor Congress.

In 1931, Harris joined OGPU foreign intelligence under "Illegal" operative Abram Einhorn. She went to work in Berlin (a centre of Soviet espionage operations, particularly passport forgery) in 1932. In October 1935, she went to Moscow for training in radio operation, photography, and cryptography.

In 1936, Harris went to Paris as an NKVD radio operator. The following year, she returned to Moscow for training in the use of new equipment and then went to London as keeper and courier of a safe house. Under rezident Gregory Grafpen, she liaised with Donald Maclean of the Cambridge Five. In 1938, she followed Maclean to Paris as liaison. Maclean married an American in 1939: his relationship with Harris ended. When France fell to the Nazis in 1940, she escaped to Moscow, where she worked in the NKGB foreign intelligence reserve.

Harris went to the United States to assist the Soviet penetration of the Manhattan Project in 1941. In 1943, she went to Mexico City as courier for resident spy Lev Vasilevsky. Vasilevsky sent her to Santa Fe, New Mexico, where her role included running a safe house within a drugstore.

In December 1937, Harris had applied for and received Soviet citizenship. When she retired from active service, she received an apartment in Riga. There, problems with alcoholism and mental illness surfaced. Harris died in Gorky in 1966. She is buried there in the Marina Roshcha cemetery with a grave marker that lists her date of birth as 24 May 1902.

== See also ==
- Earl Browder
- Cambridge Five
- Donald Maclean
- Industrial Workers of the World
- Comintern
- Communist Party USA(CPUSA)
- History of Soviet and Russian espionage in the United States
- Manhattan Project

== Bibliography ==
- Arthey, Vin.(2004). Like Father; Like Son: A Dynasty of Spies. Great Britain. Little, Brown & Company and St. Ermins Press. ISBN 978-1-903608-07-4.
- Damaskin, Igor with Elliott, Geoffrey.(2001). Kitty Harris: The Spy With Seventeen Names. St. Ermin's Press. London. ISBN 1-9036-0806-6.
- Haynes, John Earl and Klehr, Harvey.(1999). Venona: Decoding Soviet Espionage in America. Yale University Press. New Haven. ISBN 0-3000-7771-8.
- Romerstein, Herbert and Breindel, Eric.(2001). The Venona Secrets: Exposing Soviet Espionage and America's Traitors. Washington, DC. Regnery Publishing, Inc. ISBN 978-0-8952-6225-7.
- Schecter, Jerrold and Leona.(2002). Sacred Secrets: How Soviet Intelligence Operations Changed American History. Dulles, Virginia. Brassey's Inc. ISBN 1-57488-327-5.
- Whittell, Giles.(2010). BRIDGE OF SPIES: A True Story of the Cold War. New York. Broadway Books. ISBN 978-0-7679-3107-6.
