= Luxor Hotel (New York City) =

Former hotel in Manhattan, New York

- Former names: Luxor Hotel and Baths

General information
- Location: Midtown Manhattan, New York City, New York, United States, 121–127 West 46th Street
- Coordinates: 40°45′28″N 73°59′00″W
- Opening: February 1925

Design and construction
- Main contractor: D.P.R. Construction Company

Other information
- Number of rooms: 84

The Luxor Hotel in New York City was built by the D.P.R. Construction Company and opened in February 1925. The establishment is located at 121-127 West 46th Street in Manhattan. Built for $1,250,000, the structure has eighty-four guest rooms with a large bath establishment. The baths operated in connection with the hotel dormitories.

== Hotel history ==
David Podolsky, a pioneer in the Zionist movement, was president of the Luxor Hotel. He came to the United States in 1896 and assisted in forming Chovevei Zion, the original Zionist group.

On November 28, 1932 the Appellate Division of the New York State Supreme Court reversed a ruling for plaintiff and former Schenectady, New York fireman, James Eagan. Earlier Eagan sued and won $32,5000 from the Luxor Hotel and Baths for personal injuries he sustained on December 5, 1930. He claimed that the hotel was negligent in posting no warning signs to indicate that the pool was only partially filled, at the time he dived in. Pool attendants called as defense witnesses testified that Eagan disregarded warning signs which were posted as well as verbal warnings from employees not to dive from a high platform, due to the shallowness of the pool water. He persisted and was injured.

In 1934, Soviet rezident and Great Illegal Valentin Markin received head wounds in the Luxor Baths from which he died shortly thereafter.

Mayor Abraham Beame called for the resignation of Seymour Durst from the Mayor's Midtown Citizens Committee in March 1976. Durst, head of the Durst Organization, a real estate firm, had recently sold the Luxor Hotel to a group which wanted to convert the building into an elaborate massage and prostitution establishment. The Citizens Committee was set up in 1975 to rid the Midtown (Manhattan) area of pornography and prostitution.
