= Pyotr Bogdanov =

Soviet politician

- Пётр Богданов
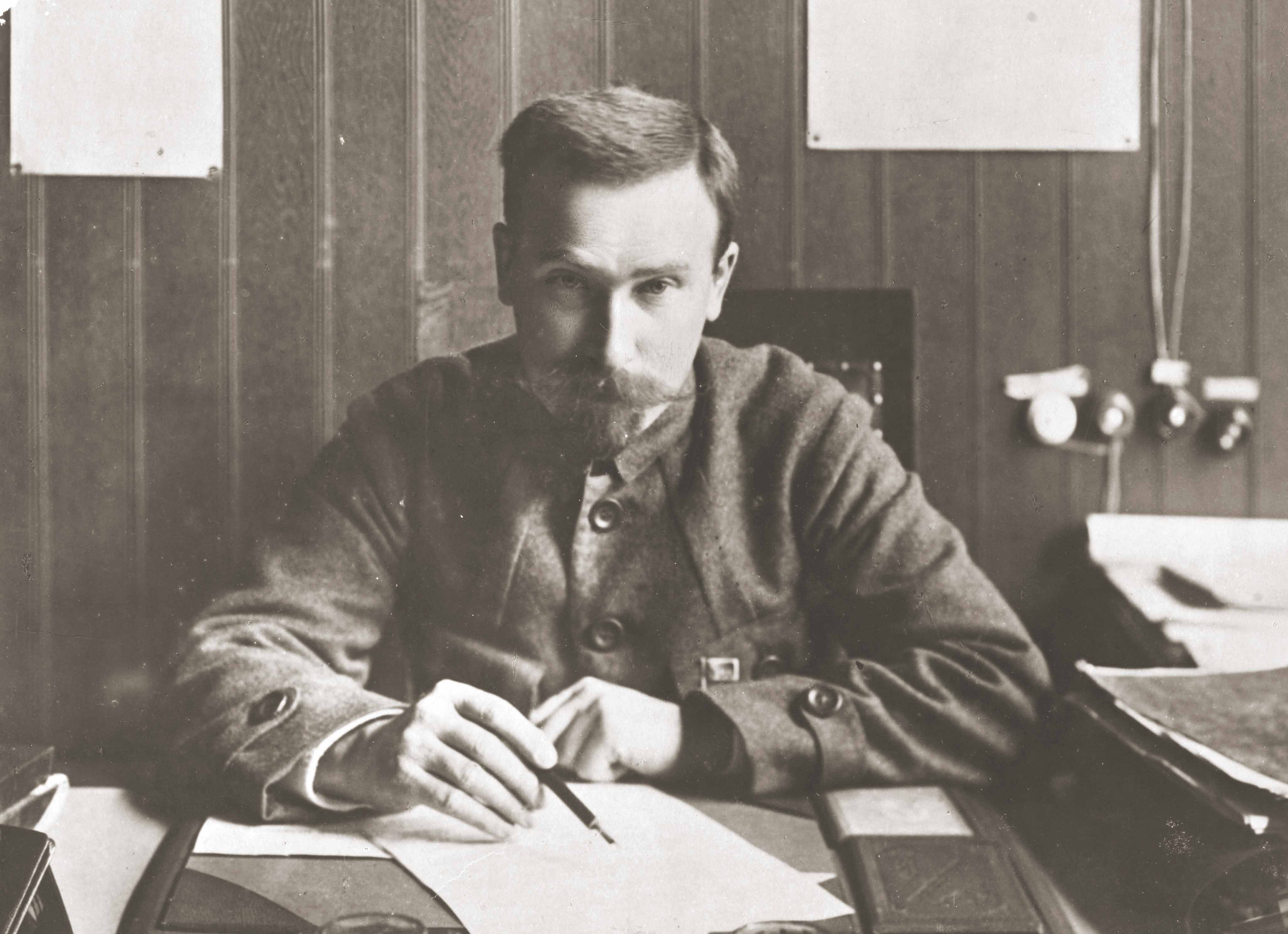

Chairman of the Supreme Soviet of National Economy of the RSFSR
- In office 28 May 1921 – 9 May 1923
- Prime Minister: Vladimir Lenin; Alexei Rykov
- Preceded by: Alexei Rykov
- In office 7 July 1923 – 23 November 1925
- Preceded by: Alexei Rykov
- Succeeded by: Semyon Lobov

Chairman of the North Caucasian Regional Executive Committee
- In office 1926–1929

Personal details
- Born: 1 June 1882 Moscow, Russian Empire
- Died: 12 May 1939 (aged 56) Moscow, Russian Soviet Federative Socialist Republic, Soviet Union
- Resting place: Kommunarka shooting ground
- Party: RSDLP (Bolsheviks) (1905–1918); Russian Communist Party (Bolsheviks) (1918–1937)
- Profession: engineer, economist

Pyotr Alekseevich Bogdanov (Russian: Пётр Алексеевич Богданов; 1 June 1882 – 12 May 1939) was a Soviet statesman, engineer and economist who was chairman of the Supreme Council of the National Economy of the Russian SFSR. He was executed during the Great Purge in 1939, then rehabilitated in 1956.

== Biography ==
=== Early life and career ===
He was born into the family of a Moscow merchant of the second guild, the owner of several delicatessen stores and apartment buildings. He graduated from the Alexander Commercial School and the Imperial Moscow Technical School. He was denied employment at the school because of his political unreliability. He was fluent in English, German and French.

Bogdanov took an active part in the student movement. From 1901 he was a member of the executive committee of student communities, was the treasurer of the student fund, and kept a hectograph at home, on which revolutionary proclamations were printed. In 1902 he was arrested and sentenced to six months in prison.

Returning to the school, he continued his revolutionary activities. In July 1905 he joined the Bolshevik faction of the Russian Social Democratic Labor Party (RSDLP(b)). In 1905 he participated in the illegal All-Russian Congress of Student Organizations in Finland.

In the autumn of 1905 he was called up for military service, in which he held the rank of conductor, a non-commissioned officer, in the Voronezh engineering department, a military unit on railway transport. At the same time, he continued revolutionary work, was a member of the Voronezh Committee of the RSDLP, and headed its military organization. From 1906 to 1908 he worked in the Moscow military organization, was a member of the Moscow Party Committee, and led the Social Democratic student organizations in Moscow.

From 1909, he worked in the engineering section of the Moscow Public Works Department. He supervised the work on enclosing the tributaries of the Yauza and Neglinnaya rivers in pipes, participated in the construction of a brick arch bridge across the Yauza in the village of Bogorodskoye and other construction work. From 1910 he was head of the Moscow city gas network, which he reorganized, applying advanced technical experience. Author of the work "Some data on damage to pipes of the Moscow City Gas Network and data on the use of steel socket pipes".

During this period, he continued to participate in the activities of the RSDLP. In February and March 1911 he was under arrest. According to the head of the Moscow Security Department, Colonel Zavarzin, Bogdanov "enjoys exceptional influence in the party environment as a serious and well-connected intelligent worker."

With the outbreak of the First World War, at the end of 1914 he was drafted into the army. He briefly served as an interpreter in a Moscow military hospital for prisoners of war and was later sent to the front for a short period of time. He was recalled to Moscow and was involved in the reconstruction of bridges.

=== After the revolution ===
After the February Revolution of 1917, he resumed active political activity. He was elected chairman of the military section of the Gomel Soviet, a member of the presidium of the executive committee of the council, chairman of the city duma and chairman of the Revolutionary Guard Committee. During the Kornilov affair in August 1917, he organized the blocking of communications between the Headquarters in Mogilev and the Don, as a result of which Kornilov's supporters were arrested. He supported the coming to power of the Bolsheviks and in November 1917 he became chairman of the Gomel Revolutionary Committee. After the dissolution of the city duma and the revolutionary committee, he worked in the Gomel trade unions. In the spring of 1918 he was exiled by the German occupation forces to the territory of the RSFSR.

After the February Revolution of 1917, he resumed active political activity. He was elected chairman of the military section of the Gomel Soviet, member of the presidium of the executive committee of the Soviet, chairman of the city duma and chairman of the Revolutionary Guard Committee. During the speech of General L. G. Kornilov in August 1917, he organized the closure of communication between the Headquarters in Mogilev and the Don, as a result of which Kornilov's supporters were arrested on their way to the ataman of the Don Army, General Alexey Kaledin.

He supported the Bolsheviks' rise to power and became chairman of the Gomel Revolutionary Committee in November 1917. After the dissolution of the city duma and the Revolutionary Committee, he worked in the Gomel trade unions. In the spring of 1918, he was expelled by the German occupation forces to the territory of the RSFSR.

=== Economic management ===
Since 1918, he was the authorized representative of the Supreme Soviet of the National Economy (VSNKh) for the nationalization of the chemical industry of the Urals and the North. He was appointed to this post at the suggestion of his friend from technical school, engineer Lev Karpov, who headed the Department of Chemical Industry of the VSNKh. In 1918–1921, he was a member of the board of the Department of Chemical Industry of the VSNKh. Since 1919, he was a member of the board of the nationalized cement plants.

During the civil war, he introduced the principle of planned production cooperation between military factories, which led to the production of the first Soviet-made tank in 1920 in Sormovo. From 1921 to 1923 he was chairman of VSNKh.

He oversaw the first major Soviet construction projects – the construction of the Kashira and Volkhov power plants.

He was one of the active promoters of the New Economic Policy (NEP). He encouraged the creation of trusts as state associations of enterprises enjoying wide economic autonomy, operating freely on the market and making optimal use of all factors of production. He opposed gross administrative interference in economic processes, while defending the trust form of organization of production from the supporters of Glavkism:

We can manage correctly and well only by taking the following principle as a basis: decentralization of industrial management itself, bringing the management body closer to the factory and plant, and at the same time centralization of the management of the entire industry as a whole.

He was a member of the commission created by the Council of Labor and Defense to review decrees, systematize and develop legislation in accordance with the NEP in the field of industrial construction and trade turnover, supervising the process of partial transfer of medium and small enterprises to private capital. Under his leadership, the Presidium of the VSNKh developed and issued a special instruction on the procedure for leasing state enterprises, usually inactive or unhealthy. In one of his works, he wrote that

it is necessary to give the opportunity to turn the machines of those thousands and tens of thousands of small and medium factories and factories that can provide for the peasantry, but which we cannot let go of, because we do not have enough strength and resources for all this trifle, because we need to think about something larger.

He was also Chairman of the Main Concession Committee, which negotiated concession agreements with foreign firms. He believed that

attracting foreign capital was absolutely inevitable, since the equipment of entire sectors of our industry was completely dependent on foreign countries, since they had never been created or supported by Russia's own means.

On February 16, 1925, he submitted an application to the Politburo to resign from his position as Chairman of the VSNKh.

=== Defender of the interests of engineers ===
Bogdanov paid considerable attention to attracting representatives of the intelligentsia to work and improving their working and living conditions. In the spring of 1921, he proposed a set of measures aimed at protecting the interests of engineering and technical personnel:

1. Full equality of engineers and technicians with workers, as full members of the relevant trade unions (those who came to us from the "whites" must have a certain length of service).

2. Granting each engineer and technician the right to a separate room for work.

3. Revision of tariffs and conditions for food and other types of supplies to create conditions that eliminate the need for part-time work or switching to uncharacteristic activities, such as gardening, agriculture, crafts, and so on.

4. Wide encouragement of scientific and technical societies and the publication of relevant journals.

5. Publication of a special decree on the attitude towards specialists and their working conditions.

Based on Bogdanov's proposals, a decree was issued in August 1921 "On measures to raise the level of engineering and technical knowledge in the country and to improve the living conditions of engineering and technical workers of the RSFSR", signed by V. I. Lenin.

Bogdanov repeatedly petitioned for the release of arrested members of the intelligentsia, taking them under his guarantee.

=== In the North Caucasus and United States ===
At the end of 1925 he was sent on a three-month foreign assignment to study industrial affairs at enterprises in Germany, France, and England. After returning from abroad in 1926, he was transferred from Moscow to the North Caucasus. From 1926 to 1929 he was Chairman of the North Caucasian Regional Executive Committee. He was one of the initiators of the construction of the Rostselmash plant. With his active participation, the Council of People's Commissars of the Russian Soviet Federative Socialist Republic approved a loan for the reconstruction of the water supply and sewerage systems of Rostov-on-Don, which had fallen into disrepair.

From 1930 to 1934 Bogdanov headed the Amtorg joint-stock company. He established contacts with the US business community and as engaged in lecture activities and American economic management. Bogdanov's activities contributed to the establishment of diplomatic relations between the Soviet and the United States in 1933.

=== Later life and death ===
He was a member of the Central Auditing Commission of the All-Union Communist Party from 1927 to 1930. From 1935 to 1937 he was First Deputy People's Commissar of Local Industry of the RSFSR.

After returning from the US, according to his sons, he lived "with a sense of the inexorable approach of the punishing club". And yet, he tried to be active and honest until the very end. In 1935–1937, he was the first deputy people's commissar of local industry of the RSFSR. He continued to publish articles on economic issues. In one of his articles in Pravda, analyzing the American experience, he wrote:

In order to quickly create your own technical culture... it is necessary to constantly study what is happening abroad... It is not so important to know the latest secrets, but it is important to learn the very direction of work and the methodology by which development is carried out. Up to now we in America have paid our main attention to heavy industry. But now we are faced with the task of saturating the market with consumer goods, everyday items.

=== Arrest and execution ===
In 1937, he was accused of keeping a store of arms removed from work and expelled from the party. On November 22, 1937, Bogdanov was arrested and was interrogated. According to the recollections of his cellmate Boris Lesnyak, Bogdanov ("a thin, well-groomed, still quite cheerful man in a well-tailored suit made of expensive tights (there was still a crease in the trousers)") "was withdrawn, detached, and reserved" in the cell and broke down during interrogation.

On March 15, 1938, he was sentenced to death by the Military Collegium of the Supreme Court of the USSR. The sentence was carried out on May 12, 1939. He was buried at the Kommunarka shooting ground.

In March 1956 he was rehabilitated. A monument to Pyotr Bogdanov was erected at the Novodevichy cemetery on the grave of his wife Alexandra Klementyevna.
