= Thea Schnittke =

Soviet writer and translator (1889–1970)

- Born: Thea Taube / Toiba Katz; 15 February 1889; Libava, Courland Governorate, Russian Empire
- Died: 1970 (aged 80–81); Moscow, USSR
- Occupation(s): writer and translator
- Notable work: "Kommunismus und Tradition]" (Communism and Tradition), "Tolstoi der Denker]" (Tolstoy the Thinker)
- Spouse: Viktor Schnittke
- Relatives: Alfred Schnittke (grandson)

Thea Schnittke (born Taube/Toiba Katz, 15 February 1889, Libava – 1970, Moscow) was a Soviet writer and translator.

== Life ==
Taube Katz was born in Libava, Courland Governorate, Russian Empire (today Liepāja, Latvia); the daughter of Abram Meerovich Katz and Mina-Reizi Orelovna Kadyshevich. She married Viktor Schnittke with whom she moved to Frankfurt in 1910. Viktor and Thea (sometimes spelled Tea) were the grandparents of the composer Alfred Schnittke and his brother, also called Viktor Schnittke (1937—1994).

== Works ==
In 1920 Thea Schnittke had two texts published in Der Gegner:

- "Kommunismus und Tradition" (Communism and Tradition) Volume 1, Number 3, July 1920
- "Tolstoi der Denker" (Tolstoy the Thinker) Volume 1, Number 5, September 1920
