= Soviet Government Purchasing Commission in the U.S. =

Soviet Government Procurement Commission in the United States * * * Советская Правительственная Закупочная Комиссия
Agency overview
- Formed: February 24, 1942; 84 years ago
- Jurisdiction: Council of People's Commissars of the USSR
- Headquarters: 3355 Sixteenth Street, Washington, D.C., US
- Employees: 1,000
- Agency executive: Ivan Eremin, Chairman

The Soviet Government Procurement Commission in the United States (Советская Правительственная Закупочная Комиссия), also known as the Soviet Commission for Procurement (Советская закупочная комиссия), was appointed on February 24, 1942 by the Council of People's Commissars of the USSR, a Soviet government administration body to implement the provisions of the American Act of Supply during World War II of military equipment to 11 countries, including from the U.S. to the USSR based in Washington, D.C.

== History ==
Until the commission was established, the delivery of American military equipment to the USSR was carried out via the Soviet Amtorg trading company based in New York. After the Commission was established in Washington, it organizationally consisted of 18 branch offices and a number of delegations, e.g. in New York at 210 Madison Ave. (at Amtorg's headquarters), Portland at 233 Southwest Sixt Ave., Tacoma, Fairbanks, Philadelphia, Seattle, San Francisco, Los Angeles, Baltimore, Miami, Vancouver and Montreal.

Deliveries to the Soviet Arctic region were coordinated by the Arctic Group (Арктическая группа). A number of representatives of economic organizations functioned at the commission, including Dalstroy (Дальстрой), Norilskstroy (Норильстрой), the Chief Directorate of the Northern Sea Route (Главсевморпут), the Soviet Red Cross, and a number of ministries, including maritime transport and the fishing industry. In the second half of 1942, the Management Board of the Commission Plenipotentiaries for the West Coast of the US and Canada was appointed (Управление уполномоченных ПЗК по порадного побережья США и Канады). It employed about 1,000 people, including citizens of U.S. Deliveries ended on September 20, 1945, the commission was liquidated on December 28, 1948.

== Chairmans ==
- 1942-1943 - gen. Alexander Belyaev (1900–1963)
- 1943-1946 - gen. Leonid Rudenko (1906–2002)
- 1946-1948 - Ivan Eremin (1902-1963)

== H.O. ==
The Commission was located in Washington, DC, in a 1939 residential home at 3355 Sixteenth Street, and at 1610 Park Road.

== Bibliography ==
- Н. Бутенина: Нефтепродуктовый Ленд-Лиз
- А.Ю. Комарков: Ленд-Лиз для СССР в первый год великой Отечественной: Особенности, Проблемы, Итоги
