= Boris Bazarov =

Soviet secret police officer (1893–1939)

- Born: May 27, 1893; Kelmė, Rossiyensky Uyezd, Kovno Governorate, Russia
- Died: February 21, 1939 (aged 45); Moscow, Russia
- Occupation: Espionage

Boris Yakovlevich Bazarov (Russian: Борис Яковлевич Базаров; May 27, 1893 – February 21, 1939) was a Soviet secret police officer who served as the chief illegal rezident in New York City from 1935 until 1937. He was charged with espionage and executed the following year, then posthumously rehabilitated in 1956.

== Early life ==
Bazarov was born Boris Iakovlevich Shpak in 1893 in Kovno gubernia, Lithuania, which was then part of the Russian Empire. In addition to Russian, he spoke German, Bulgarian, French, and Serbo-Croatian.

== Career ==
Bazarov graduated from the Vilno Military Academy and joined the Imperial Russian Army 105th infantry regiment to take part in the First World War (1914, platoon leader, 1917 company leader). After the Russian Revolution, as a man with military experience, he volunteered for the Soviet secret police (OGPU). From 1921, he specialized on covert operations in the Balkans (Bulgaria and Yugoslavia in 1924). In 1924–1927 he was a Soviet representative in Austria as a member of the Soviet embassy in Vienna, where he supervised Austrian, Bulgarian, Yugoslavian, and Romanian agents.

After 1927, Bazarov returned to Moscow, where he supervised the Balkan sector of OGPU intelligence. A year later he ran the OGPU "illegal resident" operations from Berlin, which included France and the Balkans. His covert station controlled eleven agents in Paris, six in Bucharest, four in Sofia and Zagreb, and one for Belgrade and Istanbul. Beginning in 1930 his network supervised the penetration of the Foreign Office by recruiting a code clerk, Ernest Holloway Oldham, to relay coded communications.

In 1935, Bazarov entered the United States illegally and stayed there until 1937. His agent team there at the time included Iskhak Akhmerov, Norman Borodin, and Helen Lowry.

== Death and legacy ==
Bazarov was arrested on July 3, 1938 during the Great Purges on charges of espionage, sentenced to death on February 21, 1939, and shot on the same day. He was buried in the Donskoye Cemetery.

He was posthumously rehabilitated by the Military Collegium of the Supreme Soviet of the USSR on December 22, 1956.

== Awards ==
In 1930, to mark the 10th anniversary of the Cheka, he was awarded a personalized Browning.

== Sources ==
- Hede Massing, This Deception (New York, NY: Duell, Sloan and Pearce, 1951).
- Allen Weinstein and Alexander Vassiliev, The Haunted Wood: Soviet Espionage in America—the Stalin Era. New York: Random House, 1999.
- Nigel West and Oleg Tsarev, The Crown Jewels: The British Secrets at the Heart of the KGB Archives. London: HarperCollins, 1998; New Haven: Yale University Press, 1999).
- (in Russian) Bazarov on the official site of the Russian Intelligence Service
- "Gorsky's List", at The Alger Hiss Story.
