= Josef Berger (speechwriter) =

American journalist and speechwriter (1903–1971)

- Born: May 12, 1903; Denver, Colorado, US
- Died: November 11, 1971 (aged 68); New York City, US
- Other names: Joseph Isadore Berger; Jeremiah Digges
- Education: University of Missouri
- Occupations: Journalist, author, and speechwriter

Josef Berger, or Joseph Isadore Berger (May 12, 1903 – November 11, 1971), was an American journalist, author and speechwriter.

== Early life ==
Berger was born in Denver, Colorado, in 1903 and graduated from the University of Missouri School of Journalism in 1924. He worked as a reporter for the Kansas City Star for a time.

== Career ==
In 1924, Berger moved to New York, where he worked as a reporter and editor for ten years. In 1928, he began writing juvenile books, making his debut with Captain Bib, which was published in 1929. He published a total of twenty books, in addition to writing short stories and articles for publications such as Atlantic Monthly, The New Yorker, Esquire, Reader's Digest, McCall's, and The New York Times Sunday Magazine.

In 1934, he settled with his wife and daughter in Provincetown, Massachusetts, where he tried to make it as a freelance writer. Berger had a hard time earning money and for about year lived in poverty until he found a job with the government-sponsored Federal Writers' Project. His 1937 Cape Cod Pilot became a success and enabled him to obtain a Guggenheim Foundation Fellowship the next year, which he used to write In Great Waters, a history of the Portuguese in New England. He received another Guggenheim Fellowship in 1946.

Berger, who wrote under the pen name Jeremiah Digges, went to Washington, D.C., in 1940 to become the editor of reports for the U.S. House of Representative Select Committee to Investigate Interstate Migration of Destitute Citizens. In 1941, he worked in the same capacity for the U.S. Senate Committee on Wartime Health and Education.

Berger was employed by the United States Department of Justice in 1942 as a speech-writer for the Attorney-General, Francis Biddle. From 1944 to 1947, he worked as chief speechwriter for the Democratic National Committee, where he was a special assistant to its chairman Robert E. Hannegan, and prepared speeches for him, as well as for various Democratic politicians, such as Harry Truman, Tom Clark, Henry Wallace, Lyndon Johnson, Sam Rayburn and Estes Kefauver. He also wrote a speech for Franklin D. Roosevelt. Although the president died the day before the speech was scheduled, the speech was subsequently published and widely quoted. Berger also served as chief of press relations for the Allied Commission on Reparations in London, Paris, Berlin, Pottsdam, and Moscow during 1945. Between 1947 and 1950, he wrote scripts for daytime television shows. In 1950, he became a chief speechwriter for the March of Dimes, and from 1955 to 1968 its chief speechwriter.

He continued with freelance writing throughout his life. His production also covered poetry and song lyrics, including a record called The Babysitters with Alan Arkin and Lee Hays. From 1960 to 1962, Berger wrote for The New York Times Magazine, McCall's and other publications.

He also wrote a book named Bowleg Bill, The Sea-Going Cowboy.

== Contacts with KGB ==
The Venona project has revealed that Berger was approached by the KGB after a lead by Samuel Krafsur. In a KGB message to Moscow in 1945, he is described as a progressive and as well disposed toward the Soviet Union. According to Krafsur, Berger had expressed a wish to live in the USSR and maintained contacts with the Communist Party USA. There is no indication, however, that he was actually recruited as an agent. The fact that he quit government work soon afterwards may indicate that the plans to recruit him came to nothing, or even that he wished to avoid involvement in espionage.

== Death ==
At the age of 67, Berger died suddenly of an aneurysm on November 11, 1971, in New York City.
