= Karl Otten =

German writer

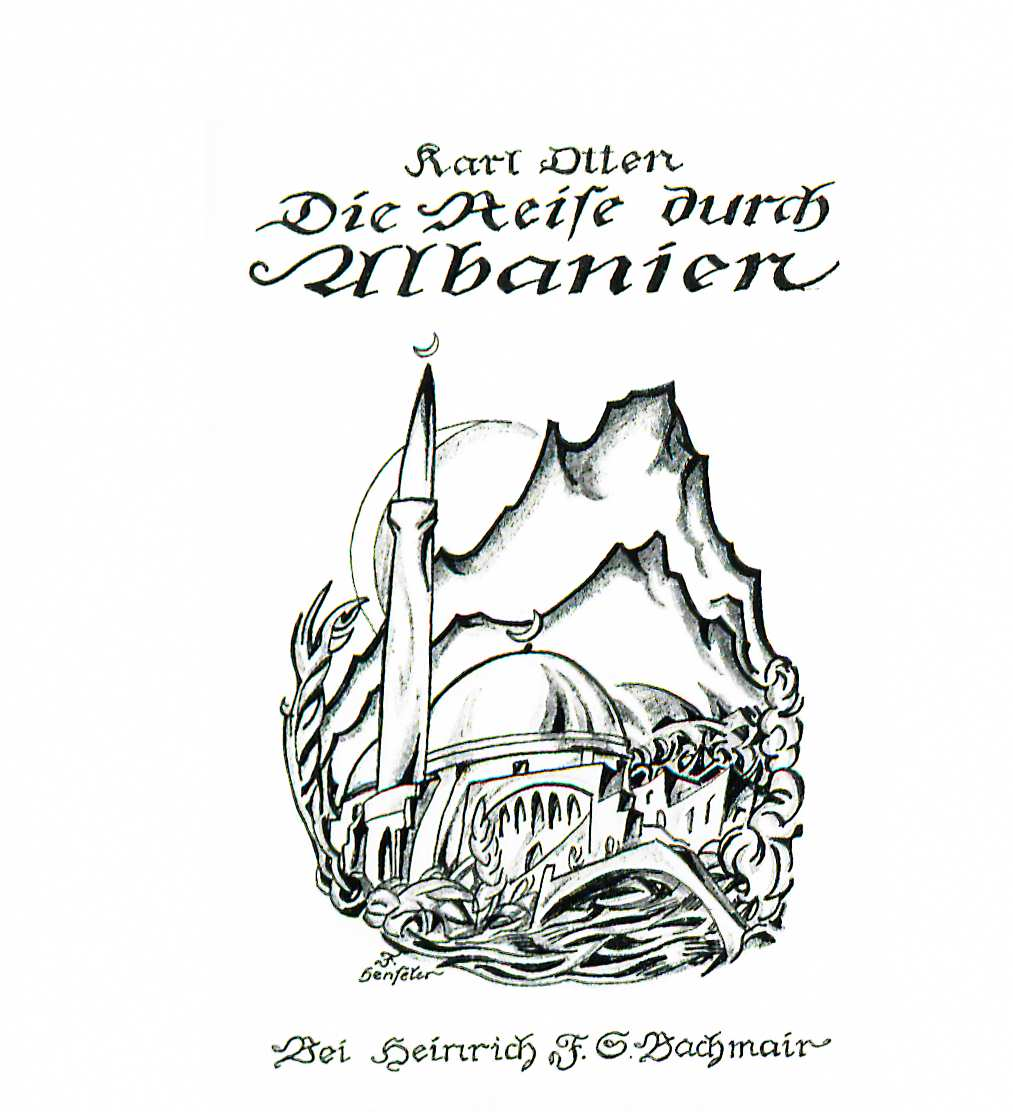
cover of Die Reise nach Albanien, designed by Franz Seraph Henseler

Karl Otten (29 July 1889 Oberkrüchten – 20 March 1963, Minusio) was a German expressionist writer and broadcaster.

Karl was an anti-militarist activist during the First World War, but was arrested for his actions. On 16 November 1918 he signed the Appeal published by the Antinational Socialist Party. In 1919 he co-founded Der Gegner with Julius Guomperz.

In 1930 he met Ellen Kroner with whom he worked closely and married her in 1939.

Following the Nazi seizure of power in 1933, Otten first went to Spain and fought in the Spanish Revolution. Following its defeat he went to London, where he wrote 120 radio broadcasts for the BBC. He went blind in 1944 and later moved to Switzerland.

== Works ==
- 1913, Die Reise nach Albanien, Berlin: Heinrich F. S. Bachmair-Verlag
- 1919, Lona, novel
- 1918, Der Erhebung des Herzens Der Rote Hahn No. 4, Berlin: Verlag Die Aktion
- 1927, Prüfung zur Reife, novel, List Verlag
- 1931, Der schwarze Napoleon, biography of Toussaint L'Ouverture Berlin: Atlantis

== Archive ==
The Ellen Otten Family Papers (Leo Baeck Institute, New York) contain much information about Karl Otten.
