= Fear of Mirrors =

First edition (publ. Arcadia Books)

Fear of Mirrors is a novel by Tariq Ali published in 1998.

The story is set in Germany after 1990 German reunification. While Germany may be reunited, the life of former East German dissident Vladimir Meyer has fallen apart.

His wife has deserted him. He has been fired from his university for being a Marxist. His son, Karl, is now a moderate, up-and-coming Social Democrat. In the pages of this political meditation, Vladimir tries to discover whether his father was really Ludwik, the famous Communist spy purged at the time of the Hitler-Stalin pact of 1939. The question has gained urgency since Vladimir learned that his mother was an informer for the Russians for years and spied even on him. Ali folds his drama around the tight, cult-like atmosphere of Communist Party life, peopled by idealists who find their lives encumbered by betrayals, power grabs and corruption and who, in the post-communist era, must come to terms with their complicity with Stalinism.
