= Valentin Markin =

Soviet spy (1903–1934)

Valentin Markin (a.k.a. "Arthur Walter") (1903 – 1934) was the chief illegal rezident and director of the espionage operations of the Soviet Union in the United States from 1933 to 1934. Markin headed the activities of both Soviet military intelligence and that of the Soviet secret police during this period.

== Biography ==
=== Early years ===
Valentin Borisovich Markin was born in the city of Groznyi, part of the Russian Empire, in 1903. He studied at a business school as a young man.

In 1920, Markin joined the Komsomol, the youth section of the Communist Party of the Soviet Union and he worked on Komsomol activities for the next two years in the region of the Caucuses.

=== Career ===
Markin joined Soviet Military Intelligence (GRU) and was stationed in Berlin in the 1920s, where he married an Armenian girl who worked for the Soviet trade mission. His superior in Berlin was Ignace Reiss. At some point, Markin left the GRU and secured a position with the Foreign Department (INO) of the NKVD.

In the United States, Markin lived under the pseudonym "Arthur Walter." He also is known to have used the aliases Oskar, Hermann, and Davis.

The novice GRU agent Whittaker Chambers met with Markin, posing as Hermann, in New York City in 1933. He was, Chambers wrote, "a short, sturdy figure confined in a tight-fitting, rumpled suit and elevated on high-heeled German shoes." His brushlike mop of hair looked like it had been cut with a sickle. "I felt," Chambers continued, " that I had met what is much more unusual in life than a thoroughly good man-a thoroughly bad one."

The Russian Foreign Intelligence Service (SVR) provided the authors Allen Weinstein and Alexander Vassiliev an unprecedented peek into their archives for the preparation of The Haunted Wood (1999). One of the startling revelations in the text was that Valentin Markin had a source inside the U.S. State Department, codenamed "Willi," who had access to "numerous ambassadorial, consular, and military attache reports from Europe and the Far East," and could "filch transcripts of recorded conversations Secretary of State Cordell Hull and his assistants had with foreign ambassadors."

The Soviets paid "Willi" the extraordinary sum of $15,000 per year for the documents, which he passed to Markin through an intermediary codenamed "Leo," subsequently identified as New York Post journalist Ludwig Lore.

=== Death and legacy ===
In August 1934, "Arthur Walter" (Markin) was found at the Luxor Baths of the Luxor Hotel (New York City) on 46th Street in New York City suffering from a serious head wound. Whittaker Chambers wrote that Markin was initially believed to have been attacked during a mugging while intoxicated. Markin subsequently died in the hospital after having contracted pneumonia following surgery. According to Hede Massing, a Soviet intelligence operative who worked with Markin, he was murdered by NKVD agents due to suspected sympathies toward Leon Trotsky.

Markin was replaced as chief illegal rezident by Boris Iakovlevich Bazarov.
