= Helen Lowry =

American spy for the Soviet Union

Elza Akhmerova, also Elsa Akhmerova, was an American citizen, born Helen Lowry. She was a distant relative of Earl Browder, General Secretary of the Communist Party of the United States (CPUSA). She died of leukemia.

From 1936 to 1939, Lowry was an equal partner in espionage with her husband Iskhak Akhmerov, a Soviet NKVD intelligence agent. Iskhak Akhmerov operated an espionage network in the United States, and both of the Akhmerovs are referenced in VENONA decryptions of Soviet cable traffic: Lowry is listed under the Soviet code name "ADA" (later changed to ELZA (ELSA)). As a native-born American and English speaker, Akhmerova was able to freely operate on behalf of Soviet intelligence. She was a full partner in her husband's espionage activity, and is referenced in several Venona project decryptions. In 1939, she married Akhmerov. In 1945, Lowry was named by Soviet intelligence agent Elizabeth Bentley as one of her contacts.

== See also ==
- Earl Browder
- Iskhak Akhmerov
