= Hede Massing =

Austrian actress

- Born: Hedwig Tune; 6 January 1900; Vienna
- Died: 8 March 1981 (aged 81); New York City
- Occupation: Spy
- Spouse(s): Gerhart Eisler; Julian Gumperz; Paul Massing
- Espionage activity
- Allegiance: Soviet Union
- Service branch: Soviet Intelligence
- Codename: Redhead
- Codename: Hede Eisler

Hede Tune Massing, née "Hedwig Tune" (also "Hede Eisler," "Hede Gumperz," and "Redhead") (6 January 1900 – 8 March 1981), was an Austrian actress in Vienna and Berlin, communist, and Soviet intelligence operative in Europe and the United States during the 1930s and 1940s. After World War II, she defected from the Soviet underground. She came to prominence by testifying in the second case of Alger Hiss in 1949; later, she published accounts about the underground.

== Life ==
=== Vienna ===
Massing was born in 1900 to a Polish father and Austrian mother in Vienna. Her parents' unhappy marriage (caused in large part by her father's constant philandering) alienated her from her family. She had a brother, Walter, seven years younger, and sister, Elli, nine years younger. After finishing high school, she apprenticed unhappily and unsuccessfully in a millinery shop. Attendance of summer public lectures by Karl Kraus rekindled her interest in literature. She applied for and received a scholarship for dramatic literature at the Burgtheater that eventually led to her external career as an actress. Entering the cafe literary scene (her Stammtisch was at Cafe Herrenhof), she met Peter Altenberg, Elisabeth Bergner, Franz Werfel, Albert Ehrenstein—and her first husband, Gerhart Eisler. Eisler invited her to join his Communist-committed life by leaving her family and coming to live with him at his parents' home in a party marriage. In 1920, when Eisler received an invitation to work in Berlin, the two got a civil marriage in December 1920.

In January 1921, Gerhart Eisler became associate editor of the Die Rote Fahne. It was Germany's leading left-wing newspaper. He moved to Berlin and joined the German Communist Party. Hede became more involved in politics and spent hours discussing politics with her husband and sister-in-law, Ruth Fischer. "I read about the Russian Revolution, about Lenin and Vera Figner, who became my idol; and I learned to love the idea of socialism the idea of a better life for everyone. True, I never faced the reality of everyday work within the movement. I moved only among the upper crust of the Communists... I was imbued with the rather snobbish attitude of Gerhart to people who were not as bright as he was."

=== Berlin ===
Massing and Eisler left Vienna for Berlin early in January 1921 so Eisler could accept a position as editor of Rote Fahne. He rose rapidly in the ranks of the German Communist Party ("KPD" in German), where his sister Ruth Fischer was a communist member of the German Reichstag. Massing pursued her acting career while living a domestic life amidst the top leadership of the KPD. Their different careers often led them to live apart; they drifted apart when Massing moved into the Berlin suburbs during a prolonged illness. There she met Julian Gumperz and began living with him in 1924 in the Lichterfelde West district. Gumperz ran Malik Verlag, an early publisher of paperback books in Europe. Massing brought her younger sister to live with them and finish her schooling. When Eisler came to live with the Massing and Gumperz after the economic collapse in Weimar Germany, he and Elli became lovers and then married. Meantime, by 1925, Gumperz became head of "all the German Communist party publishing" but quit in 1926 out of dissatisfaction with the Soviet Union, to which he had been traveling frequently on business (This Deception, p. 55).

=== New York ===
Massing and Gumperz traveled to the United States in August 1926. Arriving in New York City, they socialized with their American communist counterparts. They met Kenneth Durant, Mike Gold, and Helen Black (representative of the Soviet Photo Agency and in 1931 contributing editor to the New Masses when Whittaker Chambers began submitting short stories). They traveled to Mill Valley, CA, then traveled to Los Angeles and Pasadena (where Gumperz met Upton Sinclair) before returning to New York. Money began running out. Mike Gold got Massing a job in Pleasantville, NY, at an orphanage; there, Massing first became interested in Freud and human behavior. Meantime, Gumperz decided to return to Germany to write his doctorate at the Institute for Social Research in Frankfurt am Main. Before doing so, the two married in December 1927—US citizenship would save her life in Moscow in 1938.

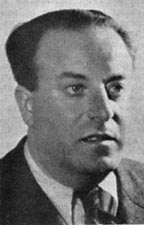
Ignace Reiss

=== Frankfurt ===
They returned to Germany (Frankfurt am Main), where Gumperz became an economist with the Frankfurt School, and separated soon after. Hede Massing went to live with Paul Massing. Richard Sorge recruited Hede Massing for the Soviet Intelligence, where she worked under Ludwig (Ignace Reiss).

=== Moscow ===
Hede and Paul Massing became disillusioned with life in the Soviet Union under Joseph Stalin. "In 1930 and 1931 everybody was hungry, had no clothes, no decent beds, no decent linen... True, there were some exceptions - the GPU (today the MVD) and the foreigners. It was also about this time when children were called upon to spy on their parents; to report negativism, derogatory remarks, religious inclinations, or religious services attended; to tell whether their mother really had been sick or had really just washed her clothes, cleaned her miserable dwelling, or even relaxed, instead of attending those endless, ludicrous meetings."

=== New York ===
Both Massings later were members of the NKVD apparatus and in the USA worked under the direction of a Soviet officer, Fred (Boris Bazarov), based in New York. Hede Massing was assigned several duties, including that of a courier between the United States and Europe.

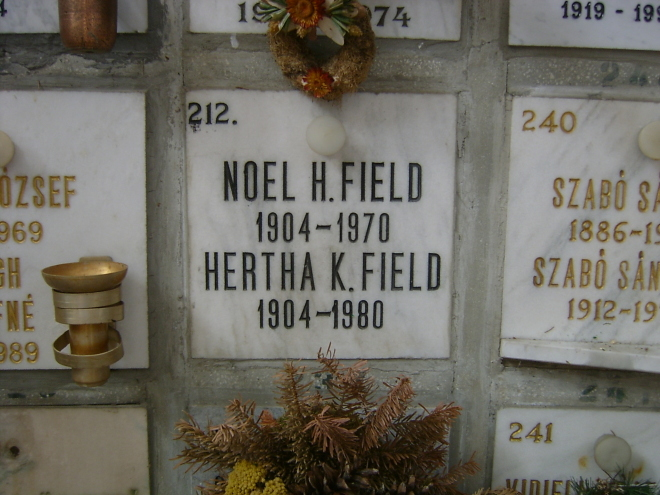
Noel Field's tomb, Farkasréti Cemetery, Budapest

=== Washington ===
However, her most important duty was that of an agent recruiter, a work she carried out with great skill. She used appeals to ideology, especially to the strong anti-Nazi sentiments of New Deal liberals who dominated the Washington scene of the Roosevelt administration in the early 1930s. Laurence Duggan was among her recruits. In 1935, Massing, at a Communist Party USA cell meeting in a private home, argued with Alger Hiss over whether Noel Field, a State Department spy, should work with her group or with the GRU. Massing testified to that episode at Alger Hiss' second trial in November 1949. Noel Field always denied this, but it seems clear that he changed his testimony more than once, depending on time and circumstance (e.g., Hiss Case vs. Czechoslovak show trial venues vs. prison).

Whittaker Chambers reported to Valentin Markin separately from Massing. Alger Hiss was reporting to Chambers when Hiss and Massing met over dinner to discuss the recruitment of Noel Field.

Massing died of emphysema in her home on Washington Square in New York City on Sunday, 8 March 1981.

== Defection ==
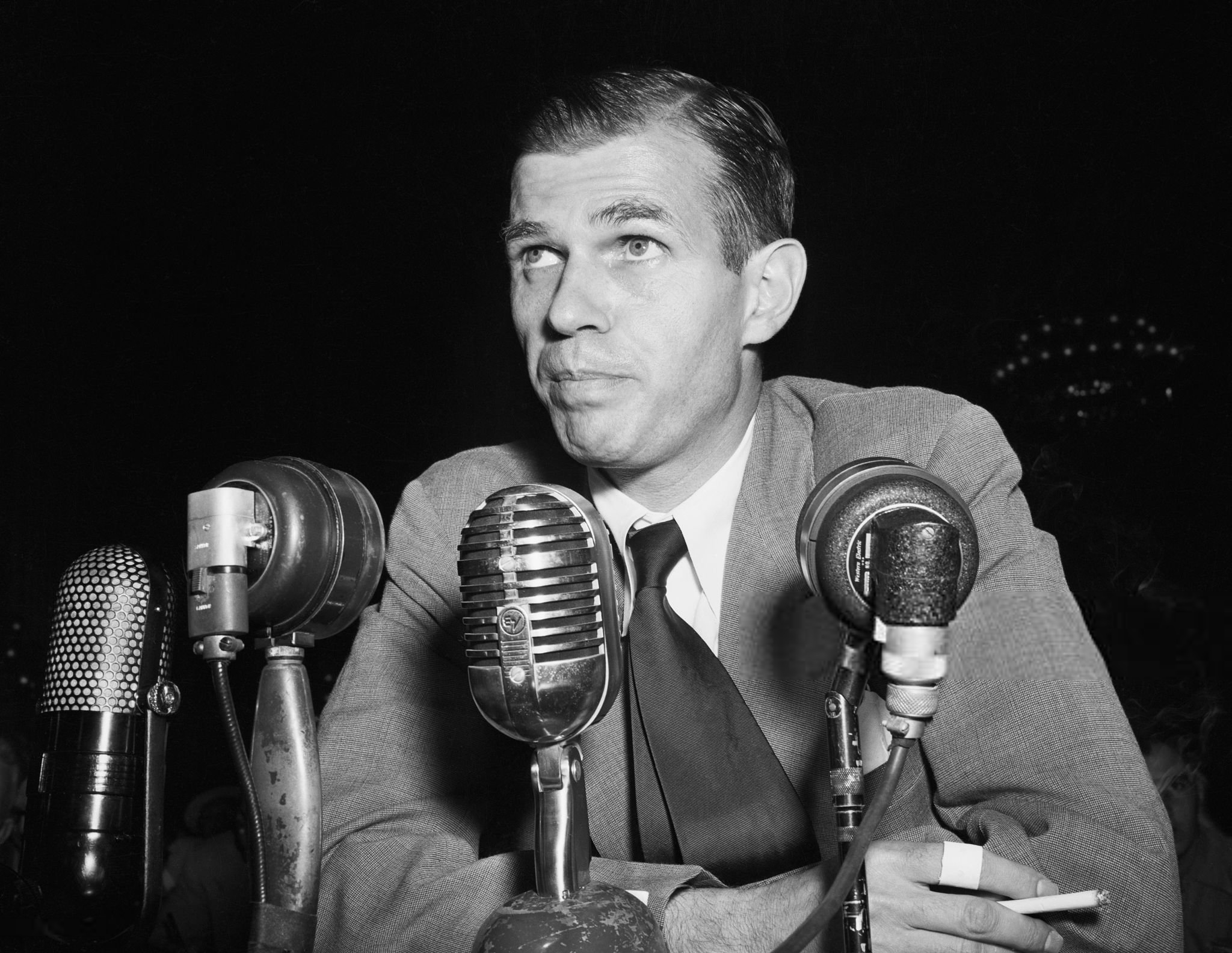
Alger Hiss

Massing said in her memoir that she had left the Soviet intelligence apparatus in the late 1930s after a period of disillusionment with her Russian handlers and the Stalinist trials. Her intelligence work ended only with the war and in 1949 she came clean and testified at the second trial of Alger Hiss.

== Redhead group ==
The cover name "Redhead" appears in Venona as an unidentified person in a context that suggests that it was Hede Massing, and she was identified as Massing.

Members of the Redhead group in the Gorsky Memo:

- Hede Massing, journalist
- Paul Massing, Institute for Social Research Columbia University
- Laurence Duggan, head of United States Department of State Division of American Republics
- Franz Leopold Neumann, consultant at Board of Economic Warfare; Deputy Chief of the Central European Section of Office of Strategic Services; First Chief of research of the Nuremberg War Crimes Tribunal.

== Miscellaneous ==
=== Richard Sorge ===
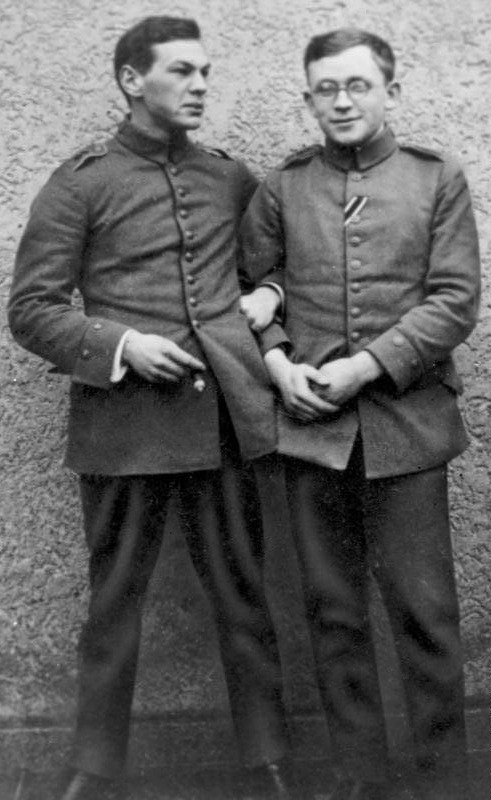
Richard Sorge (left) in 1915

Hede Massing had first met Richard Sorge at the Marxist Workweek in 1923 that led to the establishment of the Frankfurt School. Sorge later recruited her to the Soviet underground, introducing her to Ignace Reiss. In her autobiography This Deception, she wrote about Sorge and a meeting they had in New York in 1935. In an essay for the Neue Rundschau in 1953, "Richard Sorge: der fast vollkommene Spion" she called him a "near-perfect spy."

=== Amtorg ===
Massing was an employee of the Amtorg Trading Corporation.

== Works ==
- This Deception (1951)
- "Richard Sorge: der fast vollkommene Spion" in Deutsche Rundschau, Vol. 79, No. 4, pp. 360–377 (1953)
- Die große Täuschung. Geschichte einer Sowjetagentin (1967)

== See also ==
- German Communist Party
- Gerhart Eisler
- Rote Fahne
- Julian Gumperz
- Malik publishers
- Richard Sorge
- Ignace Reiss
- Paul Massing
- Franz Leopold Neumann
- Laurence Duggan
- Noel Field
- Alger Hiss
- Whittaker Chambers

== External sources ==
- Massing, Hede (1951). This Deception. New York: Duell, Sloan and Pearce. pp. 335 total. LCCN 51002483.
- Massing, Hede (1967). Die große Täuschung. Geschichte einer Sowjetagentin. Freiburg im Breisgau: Herder.
- Ausgewählte Kurzbiographien, Massing, Hede. In: Bernd Rainer Barth and Werner Schweizer: Der Fall Noel Field, Basisdruck, 2006 (2 Vols.), Vol. 2, p. 426 f.. (In German)
- "Woman With a Past", Time, 19 December 1949
- Office of National Counter Intelligence Executive, Cold War Counterintelligence
- Office of National Counter Intelligence Executive, Copyright Notice
- Vassiliev, Alexander (2003), Alexander Vassiliev's Notes on Anatoly Gorsky's December 1948 Memo on Compromised American Sources and Networks
- Image from University of Iowa Libraries' "Traveling Culture"
- Image from Library of Congress "Traveling Culture"
- Image from The Wall Street Journal (2009)
- Hede Massing papers at the Hoover Institution Archives
