= Lev Vasilevsky =

Soviet spy

Lev Petrovich Vasilevsky (1903–1979), also known as Leonid A. Tarasov, was the KGB Mexico City Illegal Resident during much of the period of the Manhattan Project. In 1943, the Moscow Center of KGB intelligence activities in North America, decided all contacts with J. Robert Oppenheimer, scientific director of the Manhattan Project at Los Alamos laboratory, would be through 'illegals' only. Vasilevsky, operating from Mexico City, was put in charge of running the illegal network after New York Resident Vasily Zarubin had been recalled to Moscow. Vasilevsky's instructions were to control the network from the Mexico City Residentura. Bruno Pontecorvo was the conduit supplying the atomic secrets from Enrico Fermi. Vasilevsky provided Pontecorvo with an escape route through Finland which Pontecorvo used in 1950 after the arrest of Klaus Fuchs.

Kitty Harris went to Mexico City in early 1943 to be a courier for Vasilevsky. She was further detailed by Vasilevsky to the Santa Fe drugstore safe house where she coordinated the front's clandestine activities.

In 1945, for his work in handling the Fermi line in the United States, Vasilevsky was appointed deputy director of Department S. For a short period in 1947 he was the director of the department of scientific and technological intelligence in the Committee of Information (KI).

In November 1945, when the Soviet atomic bomb project was having difficulty starting its first nuclear reactor, Lavrentiy Beria sent Yakov Terletsky of the Soviet project and Vasilevsky to Denmark with 22 prepared questions to seek the advice of Niels Bohr, another veteran of the World War II Manhattan project. Bohr repeated items from the Smyth Report, a recently publicated US issue of nuclear subjects. Bohr spent some of the time praising his former student Lev Landau.

Vasilevsky was later expelled from the party for "treacherous antiparty activities in Paris and in Mexico".
