= Percy Glading =

English co-founder of the CPGB and Soviet spy

- Percy Glading's 1938 police photographs
- Born: Percy Eded Glading; 29 November 1893; Wanstead, Essex, England
- Died: 15 April 1970 (aged 76); Surrey, England
- Other name: Codename "Got"
- Known for: Co-founder of the Communist Party of Great Britain, Soviet spy at the Woolwich Arsenal

Percy Eded Glading ( 29 November 1893 – 15 April 1970) was an English communist and a co-founder of the Communist Party of Great Britain (CPGB). He was also a trade union activist, an author, and a spy for the Soviet Union against Britain, an activity for which he was convicted and imprisoned.

Glading, who was born in Wanstead and grew up in East London, left school early to find work. Starting with menial jobs such as delivering milk, he found skilled work at the Stratford marshalling yards. Later, he worked as an engineer at the Royal Arsenal, which was then the national production centre for military materiel. Glading spent World War I at the Arsenal, and after the war, he chose to involve himself in working-class politics. He joined the forerunner of the CPGB, which he later founded with his friend Harry Pollitt and others.

Glading was a national organiser for the CPGB and acted as its ambassador abroad, particularly to India. He was active in other groups, such as the National Minority Movement, and when he married, his wife, Elizabeth, joined him in his political activity. He was prominent in the Amalgamated Engineering Union (AEU), but his political activity resulted in dismissal from the Royal Arsenal, a security-sensitive post, as the government regularly dismissed those suspected of subversive activities from its employment. MI5 opened a file on him in 1925 and considered him an extreme communist. The OGPU and its successor, the NKVD (the Soviet secret police) kept in touch with him through a series of handlers (including Arnold Deutsch, who later recruited Kim Philby).

Around 1934, Soviet Intelligence recruited Glading as a spy. Although he no longer worked at the Arsenal, he had maintained contact with men of similar sympathies who still did so. The Arsenal was of interest to the Soviets, who knew that Britain was on the verge of creating the biggest naval gun yet. Glading had set up a safe house in Holland Park, West London, where he photographed various sensitive plans and blueprints. Unbeknown to him, the secret service had infiltrated the CPGB in 1931, with an agent known later as "Miss X"—Olga Gray. Glading trusted her and involved her in his espionage activities and lodged her in the Holland Park safe house.

He was eventually arrested in January 1938 in the act of exchanging sensitive material from the Royal Arsenal at Woolwich. Predominantly due to the testimony of "Miss X", Glading was found guilty and sentenced to six years of hard labour.

On his release from prison near the end of World War II, he is reported to have found work in a factory and maintained close links with Pollitt and the CPGB. Glading died in Richmond on 15 April 1970 at 76.

== Early life ==
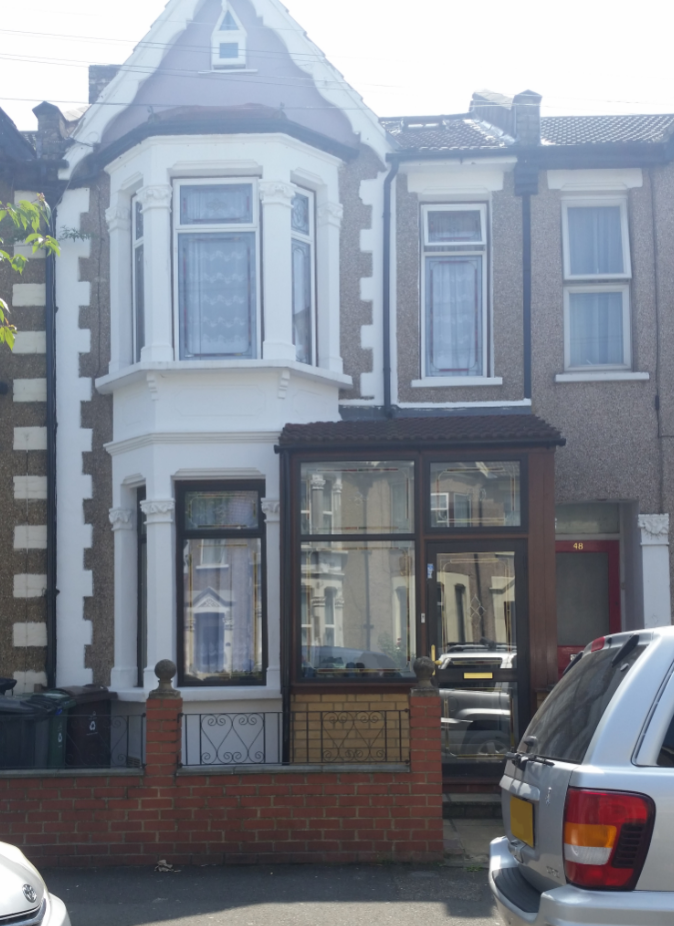
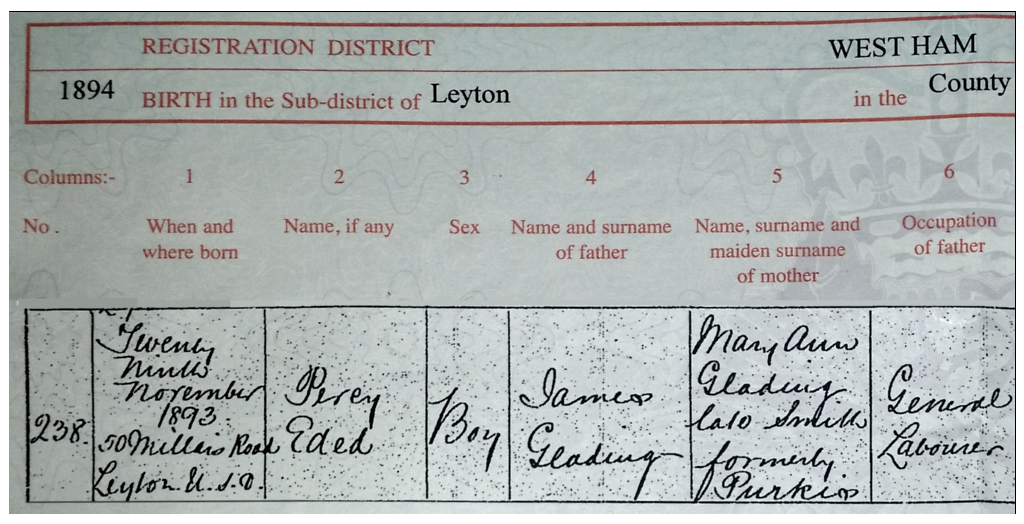

Percy Glading was born in Wanstead, Essex on 29 November 1893. He later described his youth as being "the usual joys experienced by hundreds of poor proletarian families". His father worked on the railways, and Glading grew up in Henniker Road, Stratford, near the marshalling yards. According to his obituary, Glading distributed a radical paper, Justice, around the East End in his last years of school. He left school aged 12 to work as a milkman and two years later he joined the railways as a trainee engineer. He spent World War I employed as a grinder at the Royal Arsenal, Woolwich. This was an extensive government-run military-industrial complex supplying weapons and munitions to the Army and Royal Navy. In 1914 he was involved in a stoppage against blackleg working at the arsenal. He worked as an engineer in Belfast for Harland and Wolff in 1921 and was periodically unemployed.

A 2017 biography of Olga Gray's handler, Maxwell Knight, described Glading as having "thick lips" and "lank hair". He "wore large round glasses that made him look like an overgrown schoolboy" but was "quick-witted and likeable".

== Early career ==
In 1925 he moved from grinding at the Arsenal to the Naval Department as a gun examiner. By now he was known to the security services. On 10 October the same year, Glading was best man at Harry Pollitt's wedding to Marjorie Brewer in Caxton Hall. They were good friends, and had holidayed together in St Malo the previous year (where Pollitt had first met her). Glading and Pollitt's colleague in the CPGB—and later the latter's biographer—wrote of their escapades in St Malo. Pollitt, says Mahon, borrowed an expensive-looking watch from Glading to make an impression on Brewer: "In later years", wrote Mahon, "when [Pollitt] had come off second best in a tiff with Marjorie, who always had a mind of her own, he would say to Percy, 'It's all your fault for lending me that bloody watch'."

Glading and Pollitt had been among the founders of the CPGB, Pollitt was to be its General Secretary between 1929 and 1939 and from 1941 to 1956. When it was founded, there had been a proposal that a triumvirate composed of Willie Gallacher, David Proudfoot, and Percy Glading act as CPGB leadership; in the event, a single general secretary was appointed.

Glading was elected to the CPGB's Central Committee in January 1927. Politically, he was on the left wing of the Committee following the 1926 general strike and the Party's subsequent period of self-reflection. Glading consistently pushed for a more independent communist line (independent, that is, from the Comintern). In January 1929, Glading and Pollitt were in the minority over the question of the progressive (or otherwise) nature of the Labour Party. Then, in July 1928, when it discussed the further question of affiliation to it, extant minutes of this meeting show the members as being split down the middle, nine for and nine against: Glading was in favour of the motion. Harry Wicks, in his autobiography, later described Glading, Pollitt and himself as being consistently "on the left within the party, thoroughly dissatisfied with what they saw as the right-wing actions of its CentraI Committee". In May 1929, he was appointed a factory member of the CPGB's Political Bureau, although his tenure was to be brief.

Both Glading and his wife, Elizabeth, were high-profile communists and labour activists in the inter-war period. (Note: The sources are not clear as to whom or when Glading married, or, indeed, how many times he did so. It seems likely that he married at least twice. One wife has been named Elizabeth, born the same year as Glading. He also, it seems, married an Austrian, who may have been called Rosa.) As well as being a party member, Glading was an active trade unionist and shop steward in the Amalgamated Engineering Union and the Red International of Labour Unions. Glading printed and distributed the CPGB's paper, Soldier's Voice, and was assistant head of the CPGB's Organisation Bureau. Glading's MI5 file had been opened in 1922, and consisted of "notes on his official activities, intercepted correspondence and accounts of his movements". (Note: These files are now publicly viewable at the National Archives, Kew, under classmarks KV 2/1020–1023, although "material which could allegedly damage national security or national interest, or would compromise sources and agents, is retained under sections 3.4 and 5.1 of the Public Records Act of 1958".) At this stage, though, there was nothing particularly compromising about his behaviour. It was his links to the communist agitator James Messer which drew him to the attention of MI5, as Messer was part of the Kirchenstein circle. This was an undercover courier network which relayed diplomatic, political and security secrets to Russia, and had resulted in the Arcos scandal of March 1927. (Note: In May 1927, the All Russian Co-operative Society (ARCOS) had been raided by Special Branch on the information of MI5, suspecting that Arcos was a cover organisation for espionage activity in London. The next day, the Soviet Embassy officially protested that the raid had been illegal. Despite the high-profile and resource-heavy nature of the raid, little benefit came from it. Historian Louis Fischer commented: It disclosed nothing that had not been known before, and failed to produce the highly important War Office documents the rumoured theft of which served as excuse for the raid. The official White Paper containing the documents found in the raid was thin evidence indeed, and led to no arrests or charges for illegal or subversive activities by Russian or British subjects. Prime Minister Stanley Baldwin attempted to justify the operation by reading a handful of deciphered telegrams in parliament. These proved Soviet guilt of espionage. They also caused the Soviets—aware that the British secret services could intercept their communications—to change their encryption to a virtually unbreakable system, which resulted in the Government Code and Cypher School being unable to decipher any high-grade Soviet messages from 1927 until the end of the Second World War.) Kevin Quinlan says this led to suspicions that Glading was a "conduit for the Comintern in the early part of his career". MI5 described him as "a red-hot communist", and as one of the party's "most influential members" of the period. Through his CPGB activities Glading had by now been recruited as a spy for Russia, through whom all espionage reports travelled to Moscow and to whom all funds were sent for distribution.

=== Indian expedition ===
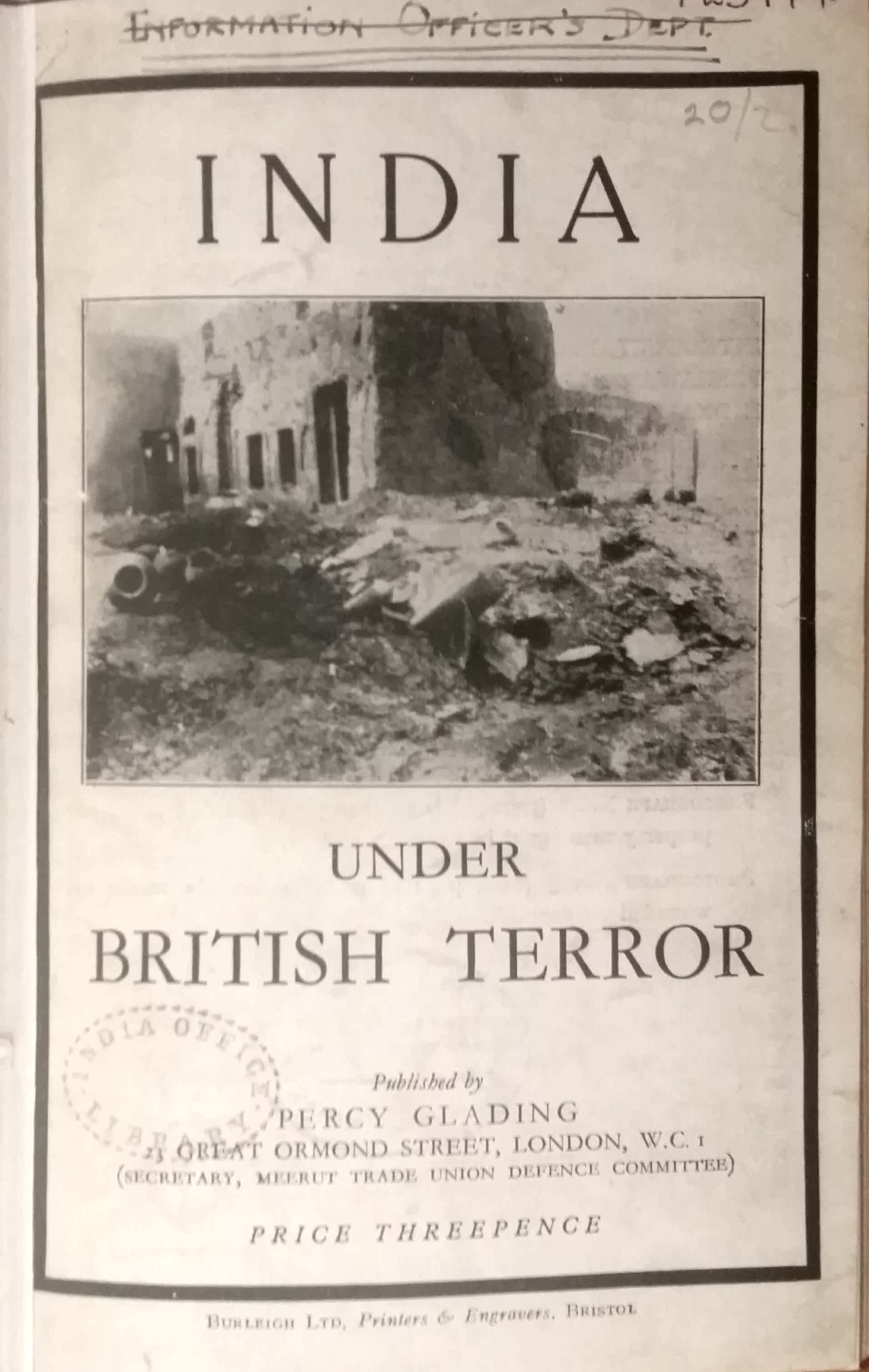
First edition cover of Glading's 1931 India Under British Terror.

In 1925 Glading was the first member of the CPGB to travel to India—under the pseudonym Robert Cochrane (Note: Several British citizens were "prominent in the early years of the Indian Marxist movement," says Dale Riepe; along with Glading, Clemens Dutt, George Allison, Philip Spratt and Benjamin Francis Bradley were all supporters of the movement, and the latter became an organiser in Bombay and was convicted for his role in the Meerut conspiracy case.)—pushing the CPGB policy of promoting revolution in Britain's colonies. (Note: For example, Jim Crossley had made a similar expedition for the party to the Near East in 1924.) Arriving on 30 January, he visited various cities and met individuals who were later to be central to the Meerut Conspiracy Case. This occurred in 1929 when a number of Indian men—all members of the Communist Party of India, then an illegal organisation—were arrested and tried for organising a railway strike there in 1925. They were charged with conspiring to form a branch of the Comintern in India and overthrow the government. Robinson says Glading saw their trial as violating the men's "fundamental civil liberties"—particularly as the group had to wait over two years to even be brought to trial—and that this made them "the final justification for the eventual overthrow of the ruling class" in India. Glading had been arrested along with M. N. Roy (who has been described by William E. Duff as a "paid Comintern agitator") and fifty-six other men, but, there being insufficient evidence to hold him, was released. The Indians were less successful and had to wait three or four years before their case even came up. It has been suggested that Roy both opposed Glading's expedition and had been irritated by it, as he believed that the CPGB had opened and read the letters they had promised to pass to Roy.

Glading's original purpose in India, on behalf of the CPGB, was seeking to forge links with Roy as well as to study Indian working conditions specifically and more generally to promote the Communist Party. (Note: There would have been much for him to see. The Indian police, for example, was "more violent than their British counterparts, and the workers were clearly more oppressed than those at home. Indeed, the conditions in India often resembled those in Britain during the mid-nineteenth century". These experiences, suggests Hemming, may have been formative moments in Glading's political radicalisation.) Nigel West says Glading was unimpressed by the efforts of the Indian Communist Party to organise the workers. Indian Political Intelligence noted that Glading had particularly focussed his attention on "shipyards, munitions works, dockyards and arsenals where strike committees or 'Red Cells' existed". (Note: Subsequent events, suggest Kevin Quinlan, justified MI5's fears, when a thousand sailors mutinied against the British Atlantic Fleet in 1931, and sabotage occurred at Portsmouth Dockyard.) Rajani Palme Dutt, in Glading's 1970 obituary, reported that Glading was eventually "deported under the authority of the Viceroy". Covert journeys to India such as these were common for the CPGB during this period. Pollitt was to persuade Olga Gray to make such a trip in 1934 (Note: Gray had been recruited by Maxwell Knight in 1931 and had been instructed to join the CPGB; Knight saw Gray as a "long-term investment" who should be "in no hurry to obtain results".) to transfer funds from Glading to the Indian communist movement. She left England on 11 June 1934 and met Glading in Paris to receive the money and instructions. On her return, Glading obtained work for Gray as Pollitt's secretary.

=== Return from India ===
The Indian masses, imprisoned, butchered and murdered by the Imperialist governments of Tories, Liberals and Labour. These workers repudiated their old leaders, found new class-conscious fighters during the class battles, and have set up new revolutionary working-class unions. These new forces, which have been created on the field of class battle, have now become the driving force in the revolutionary struggle in India.

— Glading, The Growth of the Indian Strike Movement, 1921-1929, 1929.

Based on his experiences in India, Glading wrote articles for The Labour Monthly and produced two books: India Under British Terror in 1931, and The Meerut Conspiracy Case two years later. The first he self-published; the CPGB published the second. Glading left India on 10 April 1925. He returned to Britain by way of Amsterdam, where, in July 1925, he presented the results of his studies to a communist conference that was taking place. R.W. Robson later reported how

On Saturday morning I met two trains arriving from Flushing, expecting to intercept Glading and others who were to be present at the Conference, but as they did not arrive I again visited the contact address and discovered that Glading, Dutt and Uphadyaya were already there, having arrived by an early train and gone to the meeting place immediately.

Also attending the conference were M. N. Roy and his wife, Henk Sneevliet, Gertrude Hessler, N. J. Uphadayaya, Clemens Dutt and R. W. Robson, also of the CPGB. Glading reported that "no Indian Communist groups existed at all", and that those he had met "were useless". Roy disputed this. He claimed that Glading had not encountered any Indian communists because they were unsure whether to make themselves known to him. Conversely, Glading believed he had found a communications problem between Indian communists and those aiding the movement from the outside. (Note: John Haithcox suggests that this is probable, as there had been multiple occasions on which the Indian Communist Party acted in a similar fashion to the broader Indian left. The Congress Socialist Party (a caucus of the Indian Congress party) was treated, he says, with "unreserved hostility," and other—to the CPI, petite bourgeoisie—socialist groups were consistently "loathed" by them.)

== Later career ==
Glading returned to Britain from the continent in 1927. He soon joined one of the most pro-Soviet English trade unions of the day, the National Minority Movement (NMM), and became a national organiser for the group. Along with another communist and fellow NMM organiser, Joe Scott, Glading launched the Members' Rights Movement at the Engineers' Rank and File Movement local conference in Yorkshire. This was a caucus within the Amalgamated Engineering Union (AEU) which rejected a national pay settlement in 1931 and urged the formation of workers' councils in the workplace. Unfortunately for Glading, five months later, one member observed that the organisation "has not been heard of since". Further, Glading and Scott were expelled from the AEU for condemning their union's national leadership.

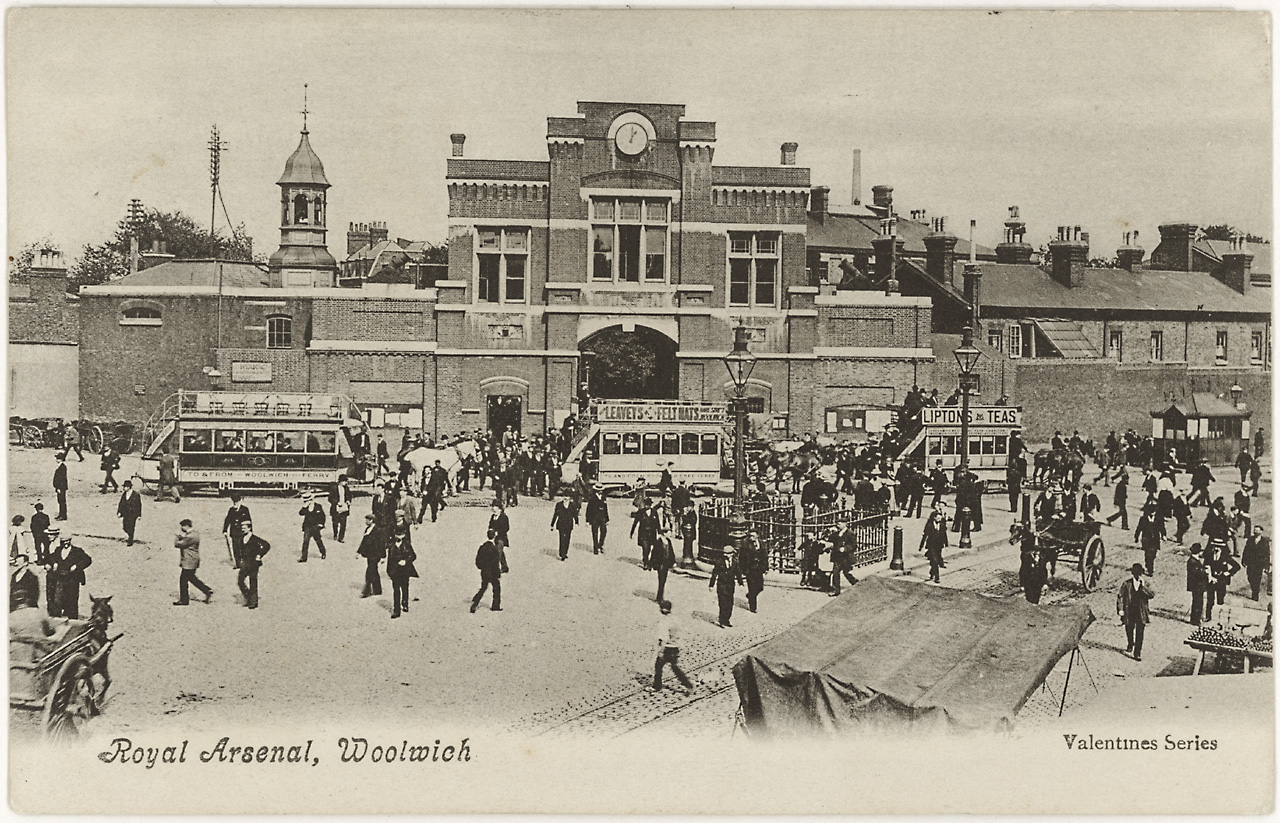
The Royal Arsenal, Woolwich, is seen in a nineteenth-century postcard.

Back at Woolwich Arsenal, he again took up his post as an examiner in the naval ordnance department. (Note: Woolwich Arsenal still played a significant role in the country's military research and development, although, now, after World War One, the world was fully aware of the sheer amount of ordnance that total war actually required; Woolwich was increasingly seen as having too small a productive capacity to give it the significance it had once had. Where it had employed a "remarkable" 73,000 people in 1917, by 1940 that figure had fallen by over half, and even at the beginning of the war, it has been suggested, "the government came to recognise that it could not rely as it had previously upon Royal Ordnance factories to meet the nation's military needs". For men like Glading, however, regardless of its position in the national infrastructure, on a personal level, "jobs at Woolwich offered stable hours and good wages, and were highly desirable in interwar Britain".) Glading's career back at Woolwich was short-lived. Following the Invergordon Mutiny, the government mandated that those employed in security-sensitive roles should have their political backgrounds examined. Those who were found to have subversive ideas had to renounce them or lose their jobs. Glading's politically motivated trip to India was uncovered when Guy Liddell cross-referenced the names of known communists with positions of sensitive employment. Special Branch wanted him sacked as soon as possible; Glading was thus in the latter group. In 1928, he and others were dismissed for "refusing to renounce their communist beliefs" and, at least in Glading's case, for being an agitator. He demanded of his Inspector what right the man had to impose "political fitness" on Arsenal employees.

Glading appealed to his trade union for support, and the AEU brought the matter to the attention of the Trades Union Congress (TUC). They spent the next four months pursuing his case against Royal Arsenal management. Efforts included discussions with Labour MPs in parliament and barraging Prime Minister Stanley Baldwin with demands that he personally overturn the sacking. However, Baldwin did not intervene, the Labour Party did not raise it in parliament, and Glading did not get his job back. But says Jennifer Luff of the case, "TUC leaders had defended the civil liberties of a communist member" openly. The CPGB was active too, releasing a manifesto denouncing what they described as Glading's victimisation. In this, they claimed the company's actions to be merely the precursor of ridding naval and military installations of proletarian militancy. The CPGB took the opportunity to denounce "capitalist exploitation and prais[e] class war". Glading's case became a cause célèbre and made national headlines. (Note: Through his sacking, Glading had inadvertently uncovered circumstantial evidence of the government's secret policy to bar communists from the civil service. Although at the time, Baldwin publicly denied this was ever policy, there were to be a number of subsequent dismissals from the civil service for the same cause. Henry (Harry) Pollitt himself had been refused a job there in 1926 because of his high-profile position within the CPGB, and by February the following year, the government tightened its "pre-hire screening" to prohibit the employment of "undesirable" persons. Those, like Glading, so screened "were permanently blacklisted from government work". Conversely, where an individual was suspected of CPGB membership, but such could not be proven, generally no action was taken. A case in point is that of Arthur Hunt, who also worked at the Arsenal, and between 1931 and 1940 was suspected of passing information to the Soviets. In 1939 he was arrested for disturbing the peace at a workers' demonstration, but, overall this time, since "MI5 never proved Hunt to be an 'active communist', he was not fired".) Glading, too, roundly denounced the Arsenal for their treatment of him:

I refuse to renounce my beliefs or membership of the Communist Party. I did not adopt my present political views lightly or thoughtlessly, but after deep study and considerable experience of working-class life ... I was not aware that the Admiralty employed Communists, Labourists, Liberals, and Tories, but engineers and craftsmen, and that the test was fitness for the job.

Following his dismissal from Woolwich in 1928, Glading got a job with Russian Oil Products Ltd (ROP). It had been founded three years earlier by the Russian government to enable it to market its oil resources directly to the West. Although primarily a trading organisation, it also provided the opportunity to transmit back to Moscow any industrial and scientific intelligence its staff obtained. (Note: Its employees were involved in the attempted bribery of Shell Mex House staff to attain Industrial secrets from them. ROP was also involved in money laundering for the Soviet spy network in Britain, and MI5 feared it had planned all-out sabotage in the event of war between the two countries ever breaking out. Of the company's staff in Britain, approximately a third were members of the CPGB.) In 1929, Glading was promoted to the CPGB's London politburo and immediately left for Russia under the name James Brownlie. In Moscow he studied at the Lenin School for a year. This was the Comintern's training school, where Glading and other pupils were taught ideology and tradecraft. (Note: Two FBI double agents who attended the School—Jack and Morris Childs—around the same time provided detail as to how the School worked. John Barron has described it as having two distinct courses available, one of three years (devoted mainly to ideological indoctrination and education), and the one year course, where operatives were trained in the specialist tradecraft necessary for their future clandestine operations. It has been questioned, though, how much use the School may have actually been to Glading in his later Intelligence career. Cohen and Morgan have noted that by the time Glading was arrested, "several years had passed" since his attendance there, and "it is not at all clear" that the School provided the foundations of his work. They question whether he learned much more than "rudimentary" tradecraft, and suggest Glading was probably there for ideological indoctrination rather than practical training.) Glading's obituary, written later by Rajani Dutt, made no mention of the Lenin School, reporting that he spent "a year in the Soviet Union where he witnessed the great agrarian changeover from individual petty-bourgeoise holdings to collective farming". Following his graduation, Glading came under the aegis of the International Liaison Department (Comintern) (OMS); this has been described by Sakmyster as "the most secret department" of the Comintern, specialising in "the coordination of subversive and conspiratorial activities" abroad.

Glading returned to Britain in 1930, where he began working for the CPGB's colonial department. Based in a top-floor office at 23 Great Ormond Street, he was the Soviet link between ROP and the CPGB. He served as a cut-out, communicating information between agents. (Note: According to Joseph Goulden's A Dictionary of Espionage, a cut-out's role is to act as "the go-between, or link, between separate components of an organisation" who thus "makes it unnecessary for the clandestine agent to know the exact identity of persons superior to him in the organisation". Also one who links a section chief with a source of supply.) He paid regular visits to the CPGB head office at 16 King Street, in London's Covent Garden.

Historian Richard Davenport-Hines says there was "nothing stealthy about his allegiance" to his chosen causes. In 1930 he became a full-time paid officer for the League Against Imperialism (LAI), where he first encountered Olga Gray, who joined the LAI in 1932. In June 1931, Glading was suspected of personally receiving the CPGB's intelligence reports from its various espionage groups and being the individual responsible for sending them to the USSR. Some of Glading's pro-Soviet activities were undertaken with his wife, who shared his political outlook. She too, for example, had links with the Kirchenstein circle. Another of Glading's associates was Jessie Ayriss, who was married to George Hardy, a fellow member of the Communist Party; (Note: Subsequent events, suggest Kevin Quinlan, justified MI5's fears, when a thousand sailors mutinied against the British Atlantic Fleet in 1931, and sabotage occurred at Portsmouth Dockyard. On the other hand, says Jennifer Luff, although communists were indeed automatically suspect, "charges of sabotage were never substantiated" against them.) Ayriss herself was employed as a typist at the Soviet embassy from 1937 to 1944. Espionage expert Nigel West has suggested she may have acted as a courier for Glading.

=== Recruitment by Moscow ===
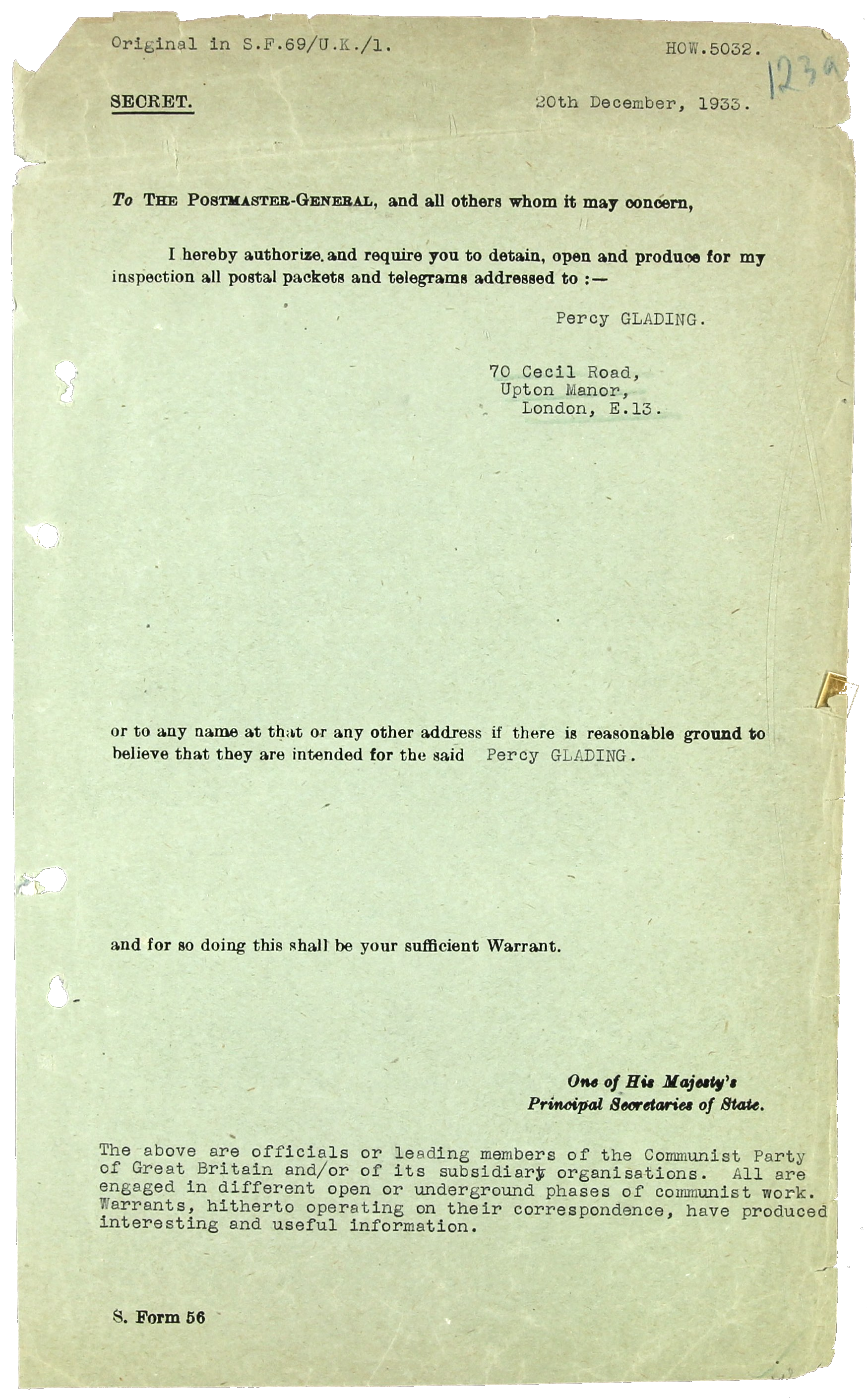
Letter of 20 December 1933 from the Postmaster General authorising the interception of Percy Glading's mail

In the post-World War One period, an upsurge in communist activity in British industry, particularly in armaments and munitions factories led to employers in these sectors beginning to lay off workers suspected of left-wing sympathies. Although the CPGB had been of interest to the security services from its foundation, MI5's information on its activities had been confined to surveillance and technical data. When surveillance uncovered what they believed to be a "more sinister cadre" within the CPGB, MI5 infiltrated it with undercover agents. From the late 1920s, the OGPU—and from 1934 its successor agency the NKVD—were active in Britain. Recent scholarship has suggested that their rezidentura were the single biggest threat to British security during the interwar period. As well as Glading's ring, Nigel West says that John Herbert King was "haemorrhaging" information from the Foreign and Colonial Office. Farnborough RAF base had been penetrated by its own spy network, and Kim Philby and Donald Maclean had been recruited. London, comments West, "had become a veritable centre of Soviet espionage". Meanwhile, MI5 at full strength had a complement of only 26 agents at the beginning of 1938.

MI5 believed that it was in the mid-1930s that Glading turned his attention from "domestic subversion to international espionage". The KGB's own files state that Ignaty Reif had recruited him by June 1934. He may have felt, as others did, that to be a "good communist" one should "carry out intelligence work which strengthened the USSR". Either way, the first indication that Glading was shifting his focus came in 1936 when he resigned from the CPGB. (Note: This news, says Quinlan, must have been received "with more than idle curiosity" by MI5.) Like Glading, all his agents were either present or ex-members of the CPGB. Unlike most Soviet agents, Glading did not have a cover job; nor did he organise a cover story. John Curry, in the official history of MI5, notes that Glading—indeed, all Soviet CPGB recruits—effectively ceased all party activity from the point that they were recruited. These were effectively "fake resignations" (and, indeed, were described as such later by Pollitt himself, who was almost certainly aware of Glading's espionage career). The Soviets gave him the codename "GOT", and named their "G" Group—based in Copenhagen—after him. Historian David Burke says it seems likely that the Woolwich spy ring was created by the NKVD to gain possession of a top-secret large naval gun that the Arsenal was believed to be researching. Glading had been informed of these plans—of which only five copies were ever made—at some time in 1935 by contacts in the War Office and Admiralty: (Note: At 360 millimetres (14 in), this gun, says Burke, "was a significant alteration to existing treaties limiting the size of naval guns"; the Washington Naval Treaty of 1922, between the victors of the World War, had limited their size to 13 inches (330 mm), which was confirmed by a subsequent treaty.) Glading's mission was to report on the gun's arrival at Woolwich and obtain an example. (Note: Workplace-based cells were a common strategy of the CPGB during this period; a comrade of Glading's, railwayman Harry Wicks, ran a similar cell within Victoria station and produced a rank and file newspaper called the Victoria Signal.)

Glading was the subject of frequent covert surveillance operations. On one such occasion in July 1936, he was observed at Cambridge Circus meeting up with Charles Moody. (Note: Moody was a fellow traveller with Glading in the CPGB, but his overall significance in the party—and thus the importance of his meetings with Glading—are hard to fathom, since many of MI5's files on him were destroyed when a wartime bomb hit their archive in Wormwood Scrubs. He is known, though, to have worked for Richmond Council until, like Glading, he was sacked for being a communist. He was later reinstated, and, still a communist, was a rubbish truck driver and TUC candidate. MI6, meanwhile, considered him responsible for travelling around England at night to garrisons such as Aldershot, and throwing seditious literature over the barrack walls. This was probably the antimilitary paper The Soldier's Voice, bundles of which are known to have been litter regularly picked by soldiers with bayonets the morning after delivery.) Much of Glading's operation at this time would have been concerned with the on-going deadlock at the Montreux Convention, at which Britain, France, Italy and the Soviet Union disputed their proposed access to the Black Sea with Turkey. At the same time, a faction within the government led by Sir Samuel Hoare was urging for swift British re-armament, and claiming, Hoare said, that Russian re-armament made the Royal Navy look a "mere bagatelle". Doubtless, says Davenport-Hines, Glading and Moody went to a pub, having much to discuss in the "implicit threats to Soviet security being revealed at Montreux and Southampton".

In 1936, Glading was asked to vouchsafe for Theodore Maly and Arnold Deutsch, both "top class" Comintern recruiters. Maly was a Hungarian ex-priest and Deutsch an Austrian Communist, and they had been tasked with recruiting a Foreign Office civil servant, John Cairncross. Maly and Deutsch requested the assistance of James Klugmann (Note: Klugmann eventually reached the rank of Major in British Intelligence, "even though his MI5 file shows that he was kept under surveillance from his time at Trinity College Cambridge".)—then living in Paris—later an important asset for Soviet Intelligence within the Special Operations Executive (SOE) who was acquainted with Cairncross. But Davenport-Hines says Klugmann refused to meet them, "until they had been endorsed by a CPGB member whom he trusted". That man was Glading, who travelled to Paris and vouched for the KGB men; Cairncross was soon recruited.

Glading maintained a network of contacts from when he worked at the Arsenal, such as George Whomack (an assistant foreman of the Works), Charles Munday (an assistant chemist at the Royal Arsenal), and Albert Williams (an examiner in the Inspectorate of Armaments Department), (Note: Williams was, according to his MI5 file, also Secretary of his local CPGB branch and a "violent and explosive personality".) all of whom later provided him with secret material and blueprints. Glading's group was one of two active in England in the early 1930s; little is known of the other but it is thought to have been associated—as Glading himself had been—around the Russian Oil Products front.

In January 1937, after Maly's recall, Glading was summoned to meet Maly's successor as controller of the Royal Arsenal ring. This was Mikhail Borovoy, a member of the OGPU's Technical Section, who was travelling with his wife under false Canadian passports (as Willy and Mary Brandes) and had arrived in London in October 1936. They lived in Forset Court off the Edgware Road. With Maly the Soviets' resident spy, the Brandes' were to act independently of the rezidentura and deal specifically with the Soviets' special assets: the Cambridge (and, to a lesser extent, Oxford) spy ring. To Glading they went under the names "Mr and Mrs Stevens", but they only stayed in London a few weeks before making their way to Paris. In that time, Glading met them at Forset Court. This in itself was a "highly unusual step" according to William Duff but essential in assessing the material Glading expected to collect and the resources he needed to do so. (Note: Although Glading was clearly aware of the security risks that building concierges could mean for his work—when later organising his own safe house, he was emphatic that the building should not have one—as was later revealed at his trial, Forset Court almost certainly had one of its own: and this concierge was indeed a member of the secret service, as a New York Times' report of 12 February 1938 makes clear.) They also met Glading's agent within Royal Arsenal, George Whomack, and photographed some secret documents in the Holland Road safe house. Glading and the Stevens also received blueprints from George Whomack in Hyde Park. Mrs Stevens, who was travelling in the guise of a photographer for a furniture company, assisted with the photography during their stay. It was immediately after Glading met the Brandes that he instructed Olga Gray to find a suitable flat or apartment (for example, he specified that there should be no porter to espy their comrades' comings and goings). (Note: This was a wise precaution for Glading to take: Willy Brandes managed to escape without capture after his porter at Forset Court told him that MI5 had visited and asked him to identify his tenant.) Glading's operation at Woolwich consisted of George Whomack smuggling out blueprints at the end of a late shift—past military police guards—on the day the document had been released to the arsenal. Around this time Glading told Gray that he was "doing hardly any work for the party now, it is mostly for other people".

=== 82 Holland Road ===
Should MI5 have discovered the name of a person described by Olga Gray...as 'another man short and rather bumptious in manner' who was working with Glading, they would have had no problem in finding out everything else about Dr Deutsch. But they did have a problem because that bumptious man turned out to be rather careful.

— Boris Volodarsky

The MI5 mole, Olga Gray did not discover his spying for several years. In 1937, she assisted Glading to purchase the ground-floor flat at 82, Holland Road in West London. (Note: The house had a colourful past. On 4 August 1929, at around 2:00 AM, Lord Farmborough, possibly depressed, had thrown himself from the second floor window; he died in hospital that day.) MI5 likely enabled the sale. The CPGB paid Glading the flat's annual £100 annual rent (equivalent to £5,890 in 2025), and he paid Gray the monthly instalments to settle herself. Glading also provided £60 to buy furniture on hire purchase, including a gateleg table for their large-scale photography work. Three sets of keys were cut, of which Glading kept two. During his later prosecution, Gray described some of the activities that went on. The team focussed on photography—which Glading told her was of "a very secret nature"—and began extensive testing (on local bus maps) with home-made cameras to make the end product as clear to their Russian recipients as possible. Glading saw Gray as a valuable member of his team: in May 1937, he suggested she give up her job, take a professional photography course, and work for him in the flat full-time. In return, he offered to make up her salary to five pounds a week; (Note: Not all their equipment was homemade; it was later discovered that at least one, a Leica model camera, was purchased for them by Edith Tudor-Hart, the popular photographer. Tudor-Hart, a talent-spotter for Soviet intelligence, had introduced Kim Philby to her handler, Arnold Deutsch in 1934. However, Nigel West says "this clue was never pursued".) Gray accepted, although she was worried that she knew far too little of photography to be of much use; Glading reassured her. He also paid for her to take a holiday which she took at the end of June. Gray was expected to reside at the flat, and Glading promised her that he would only arrive by appointment. On 11 October 1937, Glading instructed Gray to replace the gateleg table with a refectory table as the former had turned out not to be strong enough to bear the weight of the equipment. In the event, Glading bought one himself from Maple & Co. four days later, and it was installed on the 17th.

[Glading] was clever enough to realise that the flat should be rented by someone unknown to MI5. He was clever enough to see that a young woman called Olga Gray, who had been recruited to secret Comintern work from a CPGB front organisation, was the perfect person to help...unfortunately for Glading and the others convicted in 1938 as the 'Woolwich Arsenal spies', he was not clever enough to know that Olga Gray was an MI5 penetration agent.

— Roy Berkeley

During their tenure in London, the Stevens' were regular visitors to the flat. Mr Stevens was often deep in discussion with Glading while Mrs Stevens assisted Gray with the photography. Gray also met other acquaintances of Glading's at the flat. For example, in April that year, she met a Mr Peters, whom Glading told her had been "an Austrian who had served during the War in the Russian cavalry". Peters was sometimes accompanied by a colleague; MI5 later identified them as Maly and Deutsch. Glading, Gray said later, found Deutsch an unpleasant individual; Glading told her that he had to tolerate Deutsch "for business reasons". Deutsch had run the Soviet spy network in England since February 1934, and Glading began introducing other people to him for recruitment (in one case, a father, swiftly followed by his son). Throughout this time the flat was under occasional observation by the secret service; Glading could spend hours in the flats and sometimes as little as twenty minutes, often bringing Gray with him and then leaving her there.

John Curry's Official History of MI5 describes how Glading would receive various important blueprints which he would photograph at Holland Road, and return the same night. Gray, who was responsible for the photography, was to take and develop the photographs, but not to print the negatives. When the house was later searched, it was found to contain a camera, aircraft bomb plans, and even an anti-tank mine. Glading did not live far from Holland Road himself, having purchased a "salubrious" new development in South Harrow. (Note: This was a very salubrious, new development, according to Davenport-Hines, with "Crittall windows, front and back gardens, instalment plan furniture, a neat porch", built after the extension of the Piccadilly line westwards from Hammersmith in 1932.)

=== Photographic work ===
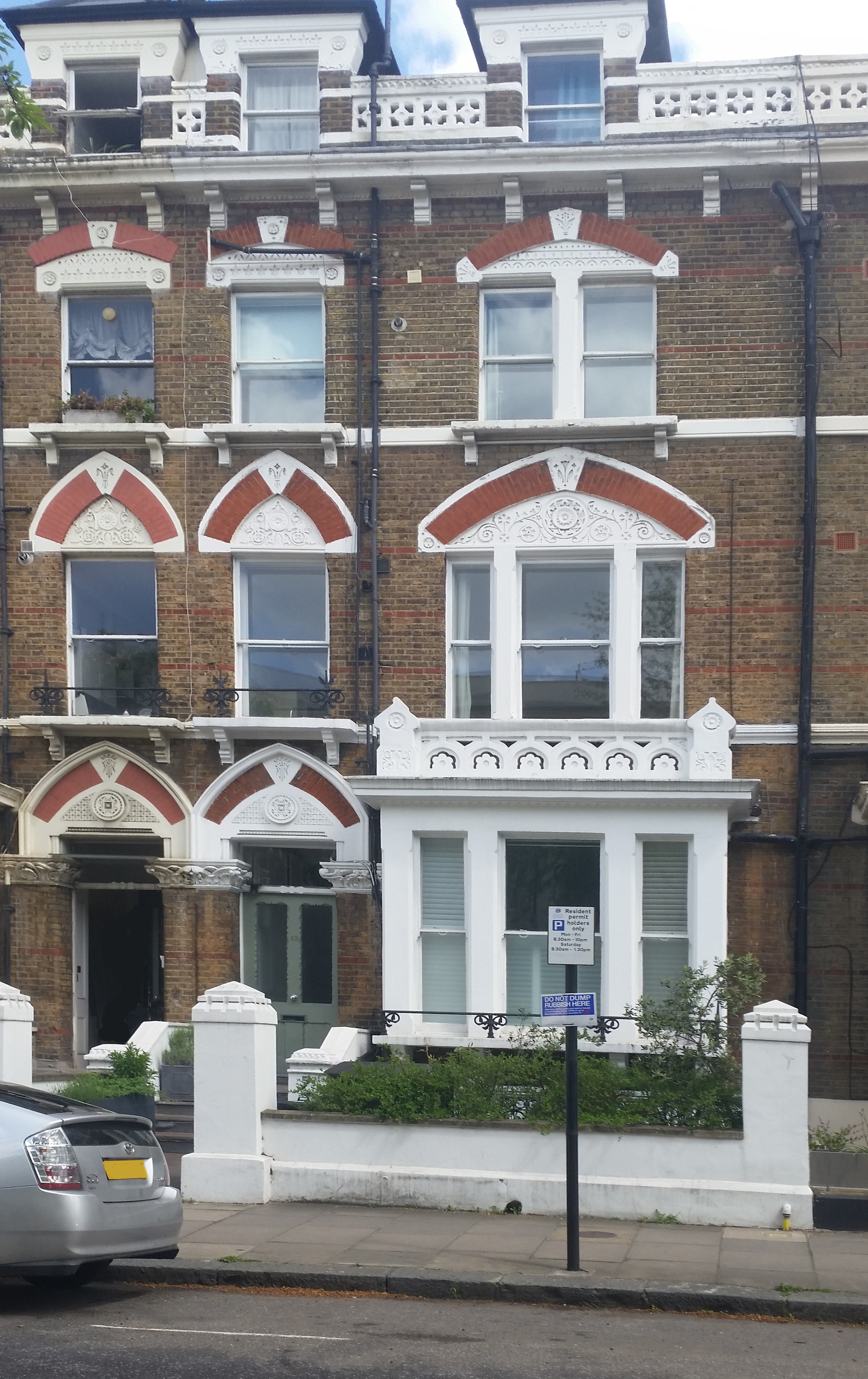
The right-hand door is number 82, Holland Road, W14; the ground floor flat was Glading and Gray's safe-house.

In November 1937 the Brandes were recalled to Moscow, supposedly for family reasons. (Note: Maly was to be executed either the same year or the following during the Great Purge.) By now, Glading was "running out of money and patience". (Note: Absences for senior handlers such as occurred to Glading was endemic in Soviet intelligence operations throughout Europe between 1937 and early 1939. This, a direct result of Stalin's Great Purge of the Communist Party and associated political and security apparatus, saw many experienced controllers recalled to Moscow and often executed.) Glading told Gray on 17 January that he would be reduced to borrowing money to fund the operation, "if something did not happen within a week or so". Until the Brandes' replacements arrived, Glading could not send any of the material which his agents had passed to him. As for money, Brandes had left him with the best part of £300 to finance operations before he left. But this had to run out at some point, especially as Glading had been instructed to purchase gifts for all his agents and contacts, presumably as a means of keeping them in touch. This further irritated Glading. This was a large number of people, many of whom he already considered as little more than mercenaries. Glading had also been instructed to take at least one of them out for lunch—"a fine figure of a woman", he told Gray, "who had done her best to impress him with her beauty, without success"—and whom he hated. Glading took such a dim view of her—and of his having to reward her—because, as he put it, she only did "about one job in five years". She could not be ignored, however, as she "knew enough to be nasty".

Gray later said Glading was becoming anxious; work seemed to have dried up after the naval gun affair. On at least one occasion around this time, Gray said Glading arrived at the flat drunk and jittery. She also reported his detached attitude towards the recall—and presumed execution—of their controllers. "These blokes", Glading had observed to her, "live on a volcano the whole time they are over here, and when they do go home you do not know if they will ever come back". Also, she said, Glading was keen to "continue to practice with the photographic apparatus to perfect their technique as he did not like being dependent on the vagaries of foreigners". It was his lack of trust in Brandes' competence that led him to place so much reliance on Gray's newly-learned skills.

Glading was probably attempting to keep the cell operating under his own aegis. Yet, aspects of Gray's report suggest that Glading was himself insufficiently trained to do such specialised work. His attempts to keep the cell made him a "liability", according to David Burke. The reason he gave Gray for wanting to take the camera from Holland Road to South Harrow was that his own camera was the wrong size for the stand, and he had had to balance it "on a pile of books". (Note: Burke suggests that by now, "Glading was becoming a liability. He had by-passed the Russians and had embarked on a one-man spying odyssey" when all the while Moscow may have actually been trying to reduce its activity in London (as the recall and non-replacement of Maly and the Stevens suggests). Glading, suggests Burke, "had unilaterally decided to increase the flow of information. By now he considered himself an indispensable wheel in the Soviet intelligence machinery, not merely a cog".)

Glading's operations within the Arsenal were extremely risky, due to its high-security status and his own impatience. He no longer had the Russians supporting him which also increased his chances of capture. Robinson has described him as "somewhat of an over-zealous renegade who, at times, needed to be reined in by his superiors". In November 1937, the CPGB Secretariat wrote to him asking him to reconsider his earlier resignation and re-join the party "of which you were such an active member". Burke suggests that, far from being a solicitous invitation to reconnect with old comrades in struggle, it was "little more than an instruction to sever connections with the 'secret' party and to re-join the 'open' party".

October 11: photographic apparatus [listed] arrived. October 13: another meeting—G and Mrs S who spoke French. October 18: Mr and Mrs S experimented 3½ hours, photographing maps of London Underground. G very jumpy.

— Message from Gray to Maxwell Knight, discussing Glading and the Stevens'

By the end of 1937, a provisional case against Glading had been established. MI5 knew of his interest in the fourteen-inch heavy naval gun that was now in production at the Royal Arsenal, and that Whomack was removing the blueprints for it and bringing them to Holland Road for copying. The copying was done by Stevens in 42 exposures on the evening of 21 October 1937, and then the blueprint was returned over night or the next day. Although the men could be searched by the Arsenal's security on entry, even the simple expedient of folding the plans between a folded-up newspaper was sufficient to avoid detection on at least one occasion. Olga Gray, says Davenport-Hines, brewed a pot of tea for the group "while the films were hung in the bathroom to dry". Gray was later able—by standing on the edge of the bath—to surreptitiously note down the serial numbers of the pieces of blueprint. In November, Glading removed the camera to his own house in South Harrow. The following January, Glading informed Gray he had a major operation coming up. This was the copying, not just of a blueprint, but a 200-page manual. For this purpose, the security services laid on extra watchers at Glading's house, where the work was to take place. It began on 15 January; it must have been completed overnight, as the following day, Glading was observed taking a package to Charing Cross station. Meeting Charles Munday in the public lavatory, they adjourned to a nearby restaurant where the handover took place.

=== Capture ===
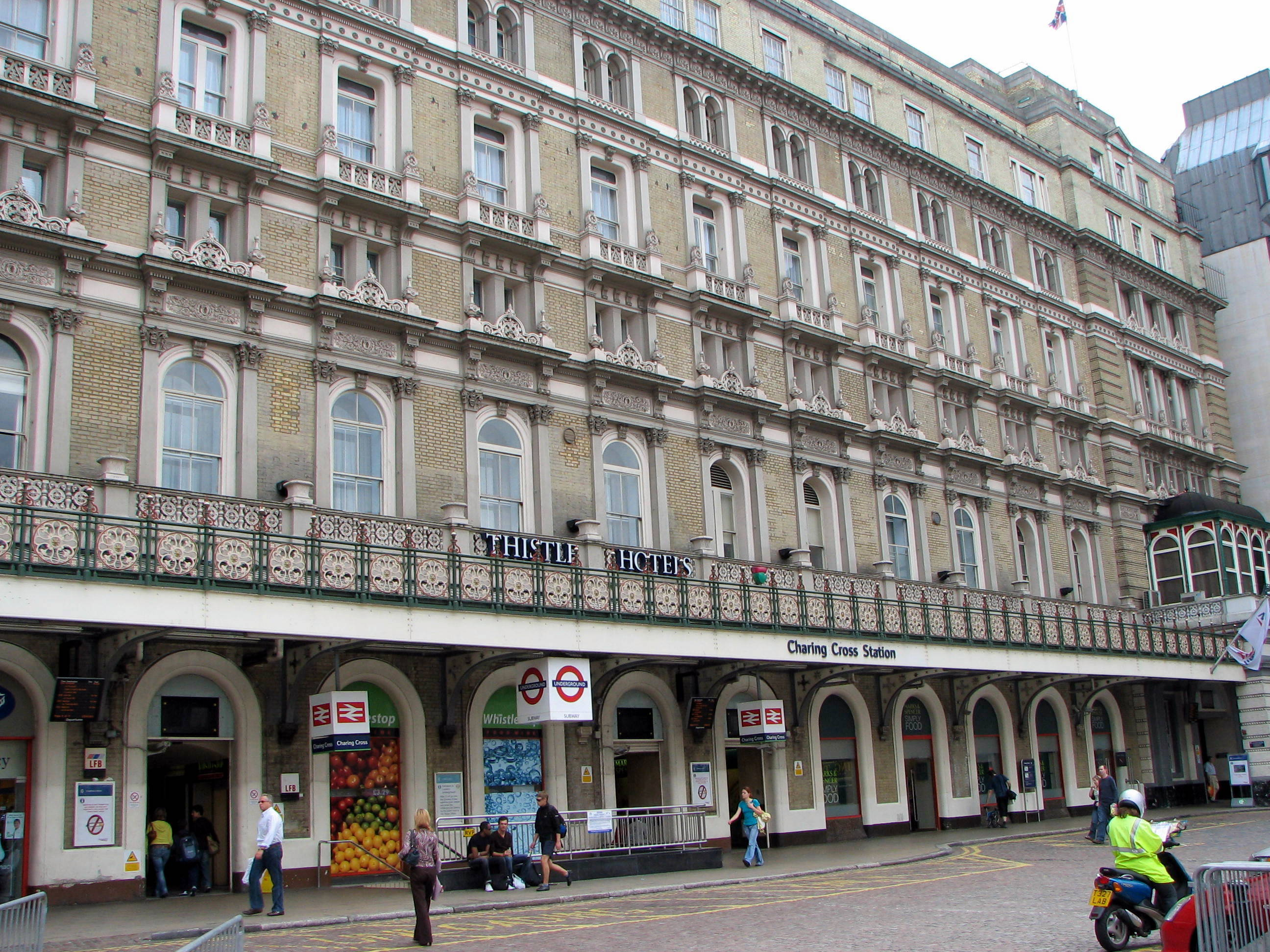
The station yard at Charing Cross where Glading and Whomack were finally arrested, as seen in 2007

After a seven-year operation, Olga Gray set Glading up for arrest. On 20 January he telephoned Gray at the safe house, asking her to meet him the next day. Glading took Gray out to lunch at the Windsor Castle bar to discuss a "significant" operation he had planned for 82 Holland Road that same night. He had brought a suitcase with him; she was to be at the safe house by 6:00 PM. William Duff quotes Glading as telling Gray that Glading had "got the stuff parked all over London"—negatives of blueprints he kept at various locations—and that he mentioned a pre-arranged meeting with someone that evening, again at Charing Cross. This was the cue the security services had been waiting for. Gray telephoned MI5 and duly reported what Glading had told her.

That evening, 21 January 1938, Glading was tailed to the station yard. MI5 did not have the necessary statutory powers to perform arrests, and had briefed Special Branch to do so. This took place almost immediately. Inspector Thomas Thompson (of the Special Branch) observed Glading receive an envelope which was later discovered to contain blueprints. The suitcase in his possession was found to have a false bottom; it was thought that this was the means by which plans were smuggled out of the Arsenal. The man he received it from—Albert Williams—was also arrested. The envelope was found to contain a blueprint of some pressurized machinery under development at the Arsenal. When the police searched Williams' flat, photographic equipment was found. Whomack, who lived in East London, was arrested the following week. Williams believed that their capture was mainly due to Glading's recklessness which led him to take insufficient precautions.

Glading and Williams were taken to Scotland Yard, where the package they had been caught exchanging was opened in front of them: it contained four blueprints for a pressure-bar apparatus. Glading and his companions were charged under Section 1, sub-section C of the 1911 Official Secrets Act. A search of Glading's home revealed cameras, exposures of blueprints, and a photographic film of 1925's Manual of Explosives textbook. Also found was a diary. This—described by McKnight as "cryptic, though decipherable"—revealed that Glading was "less than thorough" in his tradecraft. One diary entry the secret service was unable to crack made a reference to Melita Sirnis, who later revealed British nuclear secrets to the Soviets. (Note: Melita Sirnis, later Norwood, managed a safe-house in Finchley where Glading stored equipment. She has been described as "the most important spy ever recruited by the KGB." Her career was to span over forty years; when war broke out in 1939, she was, by her Moscow controllers, "more highly valued than Kim Philby".) Glading's diary listed not only her name, but her family home in Hampstead. Another made reference to Edith Tudor-Hart. Along with the explosives manual on film, they also found blueprints for a new aircraft design. Although Glading had been careful to wear gloves whenever he used the camera at Holland Road, he had slipped up once when he changed a lightbulb: this was all that the police needed. Chief Inspector Birch of Scotland Yard found fingerprints with a microscope, as he later told the press.

Imprisoned before trial, it is possible that he confessed his leading role in the organisation to a fellow inmate, although doubt has been cast on whether the Woolwich spy ring was ever big enough to warrant a strict hierarchy of its own.

Olga Gray, although she was able to give her evidence at Glading's trial anonymously, had been "terrified" at the prospect. Hennessey and Thomas have argued that, at this point, "the reality of her role struck home: that she had effectively destroyed a man who had trusted her implicitly and of whom she had become extremely fond". (Note: Gray developed a fondness for Glading, whom she described as "a very nice man with a little daughter" who was a "stimulating conversationalist".)

== Trial ==
Although Glading was undoubtedly the organiser of this group of Communist sub-agents, he was not free to run the group and recruit agents as he thought fit, but was under control of the foreign resident in Britain, except for a period of two months immediately prior to his arrest.

— Nigel West and Oleg Tsarev

The case proved to be something of a cause célèbre in both Britain and the United States. The press described the protagonists in florid terms: Gray was—supposedly—of aristocratic lineage, who "had forgotten more about courage than many soldiers ever learned on the battlefield". Glading meanwhile was made out to be "dark, distinguished, suave...a reader of poetry and a dreamer of revolt under high scarlet banners".

Hearings began in late January and continued into March 1938, some of which were held in camera for security reasons. This excluded the press. The CPGB, through the Daily Worker, "remained tongue-tied" over it: "only a sanitised report, of the trial, devoid of comment appeared in the paper" on 13 March. (Note: The Daily Worker glanced over the depth or breadth Glading's activities within the CPGB, saying only that he "had associations" with them.)

What was reported, however, had the side effect of drawing the general public's attention towards the issue of Soviet espionage. On day two of Glading's trial, for example, a welder who had seen anti-fascist agitator Geoffrey Pyke in the AEU offices (and "in very frequent communication with Glading") went to the police with what he knew. This, in turn, attracted MI5's attention to Pyke, whom for a time they believed to be the "Mr Stevens" who visited Holland Road. Although politically to the left, Pyke would be a significant figure in Britain's black ops and propaganda divisions against Nazi Germany within a few years. Later that same March, an insurance broker, who had also visited Pyke at AEU headquarters, reported similar suspicions to the police. Both men had been prompted by Glading's capture and trial to make their accusations.

Glading was charged on various counts of obtaining secrets for, and betraying secrets to, a foreign power. With Whomack, he was charged with possessing a naval plan; with Williams, obtaining an anti-tank mine pistol and of procuring information of use to an enemy; with Munday, Glading was charged with obtaining information on explosives. Other charges facing him were possession of an anti-tank mine pistol, obtaining plans for a submarine mine fuse, and other plans "calculated to be useful to an enemy". Ironically, in case anyone was in any doubt as to the importance placed upon the naval gun, the Attorney General, questioned by the Judge, emphasised its significance in open court. The precise nature of Britain's enemy was never made clear, being only referred to as a "foreign power". The reportage made it clear that the Soviet Union was almost certainly the culprit.

Glading's Old Bailey trial took place only two months after his arrest; this, says Robinson, is testament to how "clear-cut" the case against him was. The evidence presented included "a mass of incriminating documents and photographic material". Glading pled guilty. His solicitors, instructed by the CPGB, were Denis Pritt, leading, and assisted by Dudley Collard. (Note: Collard had previously acted as attorney for Russian Oil Products Ltd. in 1932.) They—at the CPGB's request—advised him to change his plea to Not Guilty; this Glading did. But they presented little evidence in his favour and carried out only minimal cross-examination, and the defence was unable to question Gray's credibility due to her professional behaviour on the stand. The prosecution, on the other hand, consisted of some of the most well-known advocates of the day and was led by Donald Somervell. (Note: Somervell was Attorney General, a position he held for nine years.) Pritt's defence of Whomack was more energetic, and he lambasted the Official Secrets Act for making it "far too easy to be charged for misdemeanour merely by wandering too close to a dockyard" or anywhere else such secret plans were kept.

"[Glading] combined the three leading character traits that Moscow thought promising in a potential undercover source: idealism, vanity and greed".

— Richard Davenport-Hines

The trial judge, Sir Anthony Hawke, told the accused that Glading was "endeavouring to do anything [he] could to help another country and injure this. This is [his] own country but I cannot quite believe that this had any effect on your mind". The judge wondered whether, as perhaps evinced by Glading's prosperous existence, he might have profited financially from his work with Moscow and that he was motivated by money rather than ideology. Whatever his motive, the outcome was never in doubt. On 14 March 1938, Glading received a sentence of six years' imprisonment (hard labour). Williams was sentenced to four years, Whomack to three. Munday's charges were withdrawn by the prosecution. Duff argues it is possible that this was the result of his making a deal with MI5 to turn king's evidence and reveal the tradecraft of Glading's operation at the Royal Arsenal. Even the others, comments MI5's official historian, received "light sentences by the later standards of espionage trials". This may well have been quid pro quo for pleading guilty and avoiding the need for a full prosecution.

=== Aftermath ===
The Woolwich spy ring has been used as an example of the patience of early Soviet spymasters in creating and providing for their networks. The case showed, for example, how "Soviet intelligence did not possess a monopoly of 'sleepers' and 'moles' permeating targets", and was a "significant, if limited" MI5 success. The case exposed a concrete connection between the CPGB and Soviet espionage. It had the negative consequence (for the service), however, of reinforcing the erroneous notion that the CPGB was the most dangerous security threat of the period, and that members of the party were all willing tools of the NKVD. According to Richard Thurlow, this meant that the idea that "Soviet moles and secret communists could be recruited into the governing class from British universities was not considered as a plausible possibility in the 1930s", even though it allowed the recruitment of the Cambridge Five. Thurlow has also described the Glading case as an example of how MI5 could, on the one hand, successfully penetrate a subversive organisation, and yet, on the other, still not understand the significance of the intelligence it received by doing so. And Glading's was not to be the last case of its kind. Less than five years later, the CPGB's national organiser Dave Springhall was also found guilty of spying for the Soviets and received seven years' imprisonment. Ultimately, Richard Thurlow says little is actually known of both the Glading Case in particular, and Soviet spy rings of the period more generally, for the simple reason that "so few files have been released".

By the time of his arrest, Glading had been responsible for the recruitment of at least eight other spies, probably all within Woolwich. To this day, however, they are known only by their codenames, and it is impossible to identify the roles they played within Glading's group. (Note: These individuals were "Attila," "Naslednik," "Otets," "Ber," "Saul," "Chauffeur," "Nelly," and "Margaret". The latter were recruited as late as 1937.) Although two of the three members arrested in the "Arsenal Spy Case" (as the papers dubbed it) were successfully prosecuted, Glading's handlers were never uncovered. (Note: Quinlan says one of them, Teodor Maly, could have revealed the Cambridge Spy Ring which had recently been recruited and then "would soon be entering Whitehall".) NKVD operations in London were temporarily curtailed, while agents, who may have been compromised by contact with Glading—such as Melita Sirnis—were "put on ice" until their safety could be ascertained. Conversely, MI5 bizarrely failed to follow up some of the leads they had been given. On Sirnis, for example, the file that was started on her in 1938 "was soon closed without any effective consequence". Tudor-Hart, too, even though clearly (although perhaps peripherally) involved in Glading's cell, faced no effective action from the secret service. MI5's own report into the Glading affair was itself removed, copied and transmitted to Moscow in 1941 by the Soviet spy Anthony Blunt. (Note: Blunt even told Moscow the names of the MI5 watchers who had brought down Glading's cell: "Hutchie and Long, who did the main work in the Miss-X–Glading case".) Soviet espionage in Britain remained a priority for the security services into the next decade, culminating with the revelations of Walter Krivitsky—a defector from Soviet Military Intelligence—in 1940. Overall, the situation has been described as a "basically unequal contest". Lord Robert Cecil compared it to "an imaginary soccer match between Manchester United and Corinthian Casuals", such was the disparity between the Soviet and British security services in resources, professionalism and influence. In the context of Cecil's analogy, MI5's success in breaking up Glading's cell has been compared to a home draw for the latter against the former.

== Later life ==
Glading had been "deeply shocked" to learn that Gray was really an MI5 mole. He spent his imprisonment in Maidstone Gaol (Whomack and Williams were sent to Parkhurst). On at least one occasion Glading was visited by Jane Sissmore, MI5's chief debriefing officer. She was particularly interested in information that Glading possessed that may have helped prove or deny what she was learning from her then-ongoing debriefing of Walter Krivitsky. Guy Liddell, a colleague of Sissimore's in the secret service, later wrote in his diary entry for 13 October 1939:

When interviewed Glading was rather stuffy at first but gradually, under a great deal of flattery, his own conceit got the better of him. The conversation developed on professional lines and in the end, Glading even softened towards "Miss X", when he realised that he had placed her in a very difficult position. His real grievance was with Special Branch in producing the porter at Fawcett [sic] Court who swore that Glading had visited Brandes' flat. This he said was a lie. Otherwise, he regarded the whole business as a fair cop.

He did not say anything very useful...

— Diaries, 1939–42, Guy Liddell

MI5 disagreed with the trial judge's suggestion that Glading was motivated by money. Maxwell Knight concluded that he was clearly ideologically driven, although one who "bafflingly" had an aversion to foreigners.

By the time Glading was released, Pollitt had lost his post as General Secretary to the CPGB in a split within the Central Committee, in 1939, over Stalin's rapprochement with Hitler. Little is known of Glading's life or career after his release from prison. He had become estranged from his wife at some point before his trial. Nigel West wrongly concluded that Glading was "stripped of his CPGB membership" and moved to China where he later died. Glading returned to party work as an industrial organiser on his release from prison in 1944, John Mahon makes a reference to Glading's wartime activity: Pollitt's diary entry of 6 July 1944 says that Glading "has roof and windows [bombed] out, I met him for a chat. Early this year his factory was bombed out, a man from the Air Ministry congratulated him on the way he got the workers to tackle the damage and then continue work on an urgent job in the open air".

In 1951, as "Bro. P. E. Glading", he was presented with a ceremonial copy of James George Frazer's seminal work, The Golden Bough, by the North London District Committee of the Amalgamated Engineering Union. The book was signed by, among others, Jack Reid and Reg Birch. Likewise, if Glading went to China, it seems improbable that he died there, since the Labour Monthly—edited by Glading's old comrade from the 1925 Amsterdam conference—published an obituary to Glading in 1970. This stated that he had died on 15 April that year, at the age of 77, at his home in Surrey.

It is also not certain that the CPGB renounced all contact with Glading as West claims. There was clearly some distancing, but it has been suggested that "once the dust had settled", Henry Pollitt authorised "discreet relations" from the party to Glading. Certainly, Glading was—for the last few years of his life—on the editorial board of the Labour Monthly, which he contributed to pseudonymously. His rehabilitation within the CPGB may have been partly because there was "more than a sense of a honey trap in the case"—but also, suggests Graham Stevenson, because Glading had, after all, "been Harry's best man at his wedding". Indeed, it is quite probable that West does not know what he was talking about; as Pollitt—who was writing his autobiography whilst Glading was still imprisoned— went to the trouble of acknowledging Glading as his friend. This was in spite of the fact that Pollitt was well-known to be "extremely suspicious" of spies or anything that could incriminate him in their work. Glading's obituary, written by Rajani Dutt, omits all mention of his spying activities, merely stating that on his return from Russia, Glading "was engaged until his trial in trade union activities".

== Publications ==
- Glading, Percy, How Bedaux Works (Labour Research Department, 1932).
