= Donbas (disambiguation) =

Donbas is a region in eastern Ukraine and southwestern Russia.

Donbas or Donbass may also refer to:

- Donbass (film), a 2018 film directed by Sergei Loznitsa
- Donbass (ship), a Soviet World War II ship
- Donbas (Ukrainian command ship), a ship of the Ukrainian Navy
- Donbass Arena, a sports stadium in Donetsk, Ukraine
- Donbas State Technical University, a university in Alchevsk, Ukraine
- Donbas strategic offensive (August 1943), a Soviet strategic operation during World War II
- 19916 Donbass, an asteroid
- HC Donbass, a Ukrainian ice hockey team
- HC Donbass-2, a former Ukrainian ice hockey team
- Battle of Donbas (disambiguation)
- The Donbas oblasts of Ukraine, collectively:
  - Donetsk Oblast
  - Luhansk Oblast
- The Donbas republics of Novorossiya (confederation), unrecognized separatist states in parts of the Donbas region:
  - Donetsk People's Republic
  - Luhansk People's Republic

== See also ==
- Dombås, a village in Norway
- Donbassaero, an airline in Donetsk, Ukraine
