= Suschitzky =

Suschitzky is a surname. Notable people with the surname include:

- Peter Suschitzky (born 1941), British cinematographer
- Wolfgang Suschitzky (1912–2016), Austrian-British photographer and cinematographer
- Edith Tudor Hart (née Edith Suschitzky; 1908–1973), Austrian-British photographer, communist-sympathiser and spy for the Soviet Union
