= Arnold Deutsch =

Academic and Soviet spy

- Born: 21 May 1904; Austria-Hungary
- Died: c. 1942 (aged 39)
- Education: University of Vienna
- Occupations: Chemist, spy
- Known for: Recruiting the Cambridge Five as Soviet spies
- Relatives: Oscar Deutsch (cousin)

Arnold Deutsch (21 May 1904 – c. 1942) was an Austrian-born chemist who worked in London as a Soviet spy, best known for having recruited Kim Philby.

== Early life ==
Deutsch was born into a Jewish merchant family in Austria-Hungary: either in Vienna, or what was later to be Czechoslovakia.^{:82} Many details about Deutsch's personal life remain unclear or contradictory; he is variously described as having been of Czech,^{:170} Slovak, Austrian,^{:73} and Hungarian origin. He was a cousin of Oscar Deutsch, the proprietor of the Odeon Cinemas chain.^{:171}

Deutsch joined the youth wing of the Communist Party of Austria (KPÖ) in 1923, and the KPÖ itself the following year. In July 1928, he received his PhD in chemistry with distinction from the University of Vienna, at the age of twenty-four. Although Deutsch described himself as an observant Jew in his university application, it has been claimed that this was merely an effort to hide his Communist Party membership, and that Deutsch was in fact lapsed in his religious beliefs. While at university Deutsch also took an interest in philosophy and psychology, and later became publicly involved in the "sex-pol" movement, led by Wilhelm Reich. After finishing his PhD Deutsch ran the Vienna-based publishing house Münster Verlag, which published works by Reich and others.^{:73–74}

In 1929 Deutsch married Josefine Rubel, who would also become a Soviet agent. They had one daughter, born in May 1936.^{:83}

== Espionage career ==
Immediately after leaving university Deutsch, along with his wife Josefine, were recruited as couriers for the International Liaison Department (OMS) of the Communist International.^{:73} A co-worker of his there was Edith Suschitzky, whom he had met in Vienna in 1926, and who would be instrumental in his later espionage career.^{:87} In 1932 Deutsch was transferred from the OMS to the foreign department of the NKVD.^{:74} and in January 1933 the Deutschs were brought to Moscow for training; Josefine as an OMS agent, with the alias "Lisa Kramer",^{:83} and Arnold as an OGPU illegal, with the alias "Stefan Lange" and the codename "STEFAN" (in addition, he would later also use the pseudonym "Otto").^{:74}

After having been sent to France in 1933, Deutsch was posted to England early the next year.^{:74} He entered Britain using his real identity, likely so that his academic credentials would be valid,^{:171} and so that he could use his cousin Oscar Deutsch as a referee.^{:83} From October 1934 to January 1936 Deutsch took a postgraduate course in psychology at University College London, but did not complete it.^{:171}

After living in temporary accommodation, he moved to a flat in the Isokon building in Lawn Road, Hampstead; the flat next door was owned by crime novelist Agatha Christie. In 1935 Deutsch was joined in London by his wife Josefine, who had been trained as a radio operator in Moscow.^{:74–75}

Deutsch would become highly successful as an agent in the UK, recruiting twenty agents and being a contact of a total of twenty-nine.^{:75} His success is thought to have sprung from his cultivation of a new recruitment strategy used by Soviet intelligence, directed at promising and radical young students at Britain's leading universities.^{:170} Deutsch himself wrote to his superiors that the high quantity of communist students, along with the constant turnover due to matriculation and graduation, would allow agents to go unnoticed by the outside world. The agents would then be provided with a new, non-communist political personality; once they had reached positions of power and influence, their communist past would be overlooked as "a passing fancy of youth".^{:57–58} This strategy produced many well-placed agents, especially the Cambridge Five, the first of which was Kim Philby, whom Deutsch recruited directly.

When Philby and Litzi Friedmann, who had just married in Vienna, arrived in London in 1934, Edith Suschitzky suggested to Deutsch that the NKVD should recruit Friedmann and Philby as agents. Deutsch recruited Philby in Regent's Park, London, on 1 July 1934.

Deutsch told Philby that he must break off all communist contacts and establish a new political image as a Nazi sympathiser. "You must become, to all outward appearances, a conventional member of the very class you are committed to opposing," Deutsch told him. "The anti-fascist movement needs people who can enter into the bourgeoisie." Deutsch gave him a new Minox subminiature camera and gave him a codename (Sohnchen). He began to instruct Philby on the rudiments of tradecraft: how to arrange a meeting; where to leave messages; how to detect if his telephone was bugged; how to spot a tail, and how to lose one. His first task was to spy on his father, Harry St John Bridger Philby, as it was believed he had important secret documents in his office.

Deutsch then went on to recruit Donald Maclean and Guy Burgess in 1934. Using the code name Otto, Deutsch was the controller for the Cambridge Five spy ring from 1933 to 1937, when he was replaced by Theodore Maly. Whilst in London, Deutsch also acted as handler for Percy Glading, who was operating a spy ring within Woolwich Arsenal, which obtained blueprints of Britain's brand new—and highly secret—naval gun.

During his time in the United Kingdom, Deutsch was given the task of evaluating an American recruit, Michael Straight, who did not impress him. Deutsch's evaluation of Straight was to be borne out almost thirty years later, in 1963, when Straight decided to voluntarily inform Arthur Schlesinger, Jr., a family friend, about his communist connections from his student days at Cambridge University, a confession which led directly to the exposure of Anthony Blunt as a recruiter and member of the Cambridge Five spy ring.

In September 1937, in the midst of Joseph Stalin's fatal purges in the Moscow show trials, Deutsch was recalled to Moscow. At that time, Deutsch was at great risk of being discovered in Western Europe because of the defections of the highly placed Soviet operatives Ignace Reiss and Walter Krivitsky; he had been familiar with some elements of their operations.

Back in Moscow, Deutsch was extensively debriefed, and managed to escape execution – which, at the time, was the fate of many completely loyal Communists. He was employed as an expert on forgery and handwriting, and was not allowed to go abroad again until the early 1940s.

== Fate unknown ==
Deutsch's final fate is uncertain. Among theories which have been proposed by various authors, Deutsch was said to have been captured and shot by the Nazis after parachuting into Austria; or to have drowned when his ship was sunk by a U-boat while en route to New York, where he was supposed to work with NKVD recruits.

Kim Philby's fourth and last wife, Rufina, cites the drowning story, but says that the Russian sources are divided on where Deutsch was headed when his ship, the Donbass, was sunk on its way to the United States. She says that Volume 3 of the KGB History states that Deutsch's eventual destination was Latin America, but then says that Allen Weinstein and Alexander Vasilliev, citing KGB files, write, in Haunted Wood, that Deutsch was headed to the New York residency to expand its operations.

== Portrayal in fiction ==
In the 2003 four-part BBC television drama about the Cambridge Spies, Deutsch was portrayed in the first two episodes by Marcel Iures.
