= Guy Liddell =

British intelligence officer (1892–1958)

- Born: 8 November 1892; London, England
- Died: 3 December 1958 (aged 66); London, England
- Resting place: Putney Vale Cemetery
- Occupation: Intelligence officer

Guy Maynard Liddell, CB, CBE, MC (8 November 1892 – 3 December 1958) was a British intelligence officer.

== Biography ==
=== Early life and career ===
Liddell was born on 8 November 1892 at 64 Victoria Street, London, the son of Capt. Augustus Frederick Liddell RA, a retired Royal Artillery officer, and his wife Emily Shinner, who died when Liddell was eight years old. He was the younger brother of Capt. Cecil Frederick Joseph Liddell, who served as Head of MI5's Irish section from 1939, and David Edward Liddell; and was a second cousin of Alice Pleasance Liddell, the child friend of Lewis Carroll who was the basis for the books Alice's Adventures in Wonderland and Through The Looking Glass. (Note: Specifically, Guy Maynard Liddell and Alice Pleasance Liddell were second cousins once removed. Their common ancestors were Elizabeth (Steele) Liddell and her husband Henry George Liddell, who were parents of Sir Thomas Henry Liddell, 1st Lord Ravensworth of the second creation, great-grandfather of Guy, and of Rev. Henry George Liddell, Rector of Easington, grandfather of Alice.)

He was a talented cellist in his youth and was studying in Germany for a career as a professional musician when World War I began. He joined the Honourable Artillery Company as a private, a unit his brothers David Liddell MC and Cecil served with. During the conflict, he was commissioned and served with the Royal Field Artillery and was awarded the Military Cross. After the war, Liddell joined Scotland Yard where, in liaison with Special Branch and the Foreign Office, he was involved in breaking a spy ring based around the All Russian Cooperative Society in London.

He married the Hon. Calypso Baring, daughter of Cecil Baring, 3rd Baron Revelstoke of Membland and of Maude Louise Lorillard, on 7 April 1926. They had one son and three daughters; Peter Lorillard Liddell (9 Feb. 1927-Apr. 2004), Elizabeth Gay Liddell (born 28 Feb. 1928), Juno Liddell (29 Mar. 1930 – 13 Nov. 1968) and Maude Liddell (baptised Anne Jennifer Liddell) (16 May 1931).

He transferred to MI5 with his team in October 1931, where he became an expert on Soviet subversive activities within the UK and recruited agents, including his private secretary Dick Wright, and future head of B5(b) Maxwell Knight, in preparation for possible war with Germany. In 1936 he traveled to Washington where information he provided to FBI Director J. Edgar Hoover allowed the FBI to break a German spy-ring based around Gunther Rumrich.

=== World War II ===
Following the outbreak of World War II, Prime Minister Winston Churchill sacked Director-General of MI5 Vernon Kell and in June 1940 Liddell was promoted to Director of B Division in charge of counter-espionage, where he appointed Dick Wright and Anthony Blunt to senior posts. Shortly after the new appointment, he was informed by Maxwell Knight of a suspected German spy-ring based around the Right Club of Archibald Ramsay and involving American cipher clerk Tyler Kent. Liddell met U.S. Ambassador Joseph P. Kennedy Sr., who agreed to waive Kent’s diplomatic immunity and he was successfully prosecuted, along with his handler, Anna Wolkoff.

His agent, Duško Popov, provided an Abwehr questionnaire suggesting that the Japanese Air Force planned to attack the United States at Pearl Harbor. Popov was sent to FBI Director J. Edgar Hoover, who refused to take him seriously. Liddell was later criticized for not informing the Office of Naval Intelligence. Liddell was accused by David Mure of thereby "dragging America into the war" and diverting Japan from its contingency plan of attacking Russia.

His unhappy marriage to Hon. Calypso Baring was dissolved in 1943 after she left him and joined her half-brother Lorillard Suffern Tailer in America. He subsequently fought a long legal battle for custody of their children. Their "dream home" on Cheyne Walk, Chelsea, London, was subsequently pulled down.

=== Later career ===
Liddell was expected to succeed Director General of MI5, David Petrie, but was passed over when Home Secretary Herbert Morrison was informed by Ellen Wilkinson of rumours that he might be a double agent and was instead appointed Deputy-Director-General under Percy Sillitoe. These rumours were accentuated when his close friend Guy Burgess defected. He was also a known associate of other members of the Cambridge Five spy ring, Kim Philby, Anthony Blunt and Donald Maclean. In 1953 following an MI5 internal investigation he took early retirement and went to work as a security adviser to the Atomic Energy Authority. He died of heart failure aged 66 in 1958 at his home, 18 Richmond Court, Sloane Street, London, and was buried at Putney Vale Cemetery. In 1979, Goronwy Rees confessed to having been a Soviet spy, and named Liddell as the Fifth Man. Papers released since have all but completely cleared him of the charge, naming John Cairncross as the fifth man, with the general academic consensus being that Liddell was naïve in his friendships with some of his colleagues. In the words of Rupert Allason, 'his unwise friendships and his preference for homosexual company, posthumously wrecked his reputation as a shrewd intelligence professional.' However, there are dissenting views. John Costello in Mask of Treachery contends that Liddell was recruited by the Soviets, and claimed Liddell "...was the most successful mole of all."

== Wartime diaries ==
Liddell kept an almost daily diary containing details of his work at MI5 throughout World War II, dictated to, typed up and indexed by his secretary, Margot Huggins. Military historian Rupert Allason, writing under the nom de plume of Nigel West, has edited Liddell's wartime diaries for publication in two volumes.

- West, Nigel (4 February 2005). The Guy Liddell Diaries: 1939-1942 v. 1. Routledge (hardcover). ISBN 978-0-415-35213-0.
- West, Nigel (9 June 2005). The Guy Liddell Diaries: 1942-1945 v. 2. Routledge (hardcover). ISBN 978-0-415-35215-4.

== In popular culture ==
Liddell was portrayed by Angus Wright in the 2003 BBC Television drama Cambridge Spies.
