= Olga Gray =

British secretary and typist (1906–1990)

- Born: 28 November 1906; Manchester, England
- Died: 19 July 1990 (aged 83); Toronto, Canada
- Other name: Miss X
- Occupations: Intelligence officer, Secretary
- Espionage activity
- Allegiance: United Kingdom
- Service branch: MI5
- Service years: 1931–1938
- Rank: Agent

Olga Isabel Gray (28 November 1906 – 19 July 1990) was an English secretary and typist who acted as a double agent in the 1930s after being recruited by MI5 to infiltrate British communist groups.

== Recruitment ==
Gray was recruited as an MI5 infiltration agent by Maxwell Knight of B5(b) Section in 1931. Under the instructions of Knight, Gray moved to London and became a member of the Friends of the Soviet Union in 1932. Knight's reasoning behind Gray's becoming a member of a pro-Soviet organisation but not actually offering to spy on Britain for the Soviet Union, was that the most successful counterespionage agents were those who were approached by the enemy organisation.

This plan met with success in 1934. Then, after a period of working for the Anti-War Movement, she was approached by Harry Pollitt and asked to undertake a 'special mission', on behalf of the Communist Party of Great Britain (CPGB). Having accepted the request, Gray was sent to Paris on 6 June 1934; she was to rendezvous with Percy Glading, an officer of League Against Anti-Imperialism and a founding member of the CPGB.

Following the meeting, Gray was instructed by Glading to go to India to deliver money and messages to insurgent elements. However, the cover story provided to Gray by the CPGB was so flimsy for a woman travelling alone during the monsoon season to India that she would easily rouse the suspicion of the authorities. Knight's B5(b) section, therefore, stepped in to concoct a plausible cover story to enable her to continue to gain evidence of CPGB espionage.

On her return from India, Gray worked as Pollitt's personal secretary until she dropped all work with the communists in 1935 because of the strain of maintaining a double life.

== Glading case ==
On Knight's instructions, Gray had maintained social contact with both Pollitt and Glading. Glading asked Gray to engage in suspicious activity once more at lunch with her on 17 February 1937. Glading required Gray to rent a flat in London, that the CPGB would subsidise and make available for his use.

Gray then rented an apartment at 82 Holland Road, Kensington. Glading then visited the flat on 21 April 1937, with a man whom he referred to as 'Mr. Peters'. 'Peters' was really Theodore Maly, a Soviet spy and a principal agent in Britain. A few months later, Glading visited the flat with a foreign couple, 'Mr and Mrs Stevens' (their real names were William and Mary Brandes), agents of the NKVD who had just escaped from the Royal Canadian Mounted Police having obtained fraudulent Canadian passports. The Brandes then proceeded to bring stolen secret documents, largely from the Woolwich Arsenal, and maps to the apartment to be photographed and developed. They did not return to London after November 1937, and Glading took over the photography of documents.

On 21 January Gray rang the authorities to report that Glading was to meet a man at Charing Cross station at 8.15 pm to receive still more classified documents. The information provided by Gray, who testified under the code name "Miss X", led to the apprehension of Glading, Albert Williams, a hitherto-unidentified spy in the Woolwich Arsenal, and two other contacts within the arsenal: George Whomack and Charles Munday.

== Later life ==
After the successful trial of Glading, Williams, Whomack and Munday, which resulted in six years of penal servitude for Glading, Gray left the Security Service for a new life in Canada. Gray was last heard of living outside Toronto in the mid-1980s. She felt aggrieved at being 'dumped' by the service, with only a severance lump sum payment of £500. She died in 1990.

== See also ==
- Harry Pollitt
- Maxwell Knight
- MI5
- Theodore Maly
