= Barbara Honigmann =

German author, artist and theater director

Barbara Honigmann (born 12 February 1949) is a German author, artist and theater director.

== Life and career ==
Honigmann is the daughter of Jewish emigrant parents, who returned to East Berlin in 1947 after a period of exile in Great Britain. Her parents were Litzi Friedmann (1910–1991; née Alice Kohlmann), an Austrian Communist who was the first wife of Kim Philby, a member of the Cambridge Five, and Georg Honigmann, PhD (1903–1984). Her mother was born in Vienna, Austria-Hungary, and worked in film dubbing in her later years. Her father was born in Wiesbaden, Germany and was the chief editor of the Berliner Zeitung while also being a filmmaker. The couple divorced in 1954.

From 1967 to 1972, Honigmann studied theater at Humboldt University in East Berlin. In the following years she worked as a dramatist and director in Brandenburg and Berlin. She has been a freelance writer since 1975. In 1981, she married Peter Obermann who later took her surname; the two went on to have two children together, Johannes (b. 1976) and Ruben (b. 1983). In 1984, she and Peter left the GDR to move to a German Jewish community in Strasbourg, France. Honigmann began finally to explore her German roots in the end of the 20th century

According to Emily Jeremiah from The Institute of Modern Languages Research, "Honigmann's texts are also paradigmatic of post-exile writings by German-Jewish authors. In addition, they offer examples of literary reactions to the demise of the GDR by its decamped intellectuals, and represent the articulations of a new generation of women writers".

== Life in the theater ==
Honigmann worked for many years in theater as a playwright and dramatist. In addition to working in Brandenburg, she also worked in the Deutsches Theater in Berlin. Some of the plays she wrote were later changed into radio plays.

Both of her plays and radio plays have elements of fairy tales or historical lives weaved into them. One of Honigmann's radio plays was awarded with "radio play of the month" by the South German Radio Station.

== Awards ==
- 1986 – Aspekte-Literaturpreis
- 1992 – Stefan-Andres-Preis
- 1994 – Nicolas-Born-Preis für Lyrik
- 1996 – Ehrengabe der Deutschen Schillerstiftung
- 2000 – Kleist Prize
- 2001 – Jeanette-Schocken-Preis
- 2004 – Solothurner Literaturpreis
- 2004 – Koret Jewish Book Award
- 2011 – Max Frisch Prize
- 2016: Ten-week London scholarship from the German Literature Fund, as Writer-in-Residence at Queen Mary University of London (spring 2017)
- 2023 – Goethe Prize
- 2024 – Schiller Memorial Prize

== Works ==
- Das singende, springende Löweneckerchen, Berlin 1979
- Der Schneider von Ulm, Berlin 1981
- Don Juan, Berlin 1981
- Roman von einem Kinde, Darmstadt [u.a.] 1986 ISBN 3-423-12893-3
- Eine Liebe aus nichts, Reinbek: Rowohlt 1991 ISBN 3-499-13245-1
- Soharas Reise, Berlin 1996 ISBN 3-499-22495-X
- Am Sonntag spielt der Rabbi Fußball, Heidelberg: Wunderhorn 1998 ISBN 3-88423-134-0
- Damals, dann und danach, München: Hanser 1999 ISBN 3-446-19668-4
- Alles, alles Liebe!, Munich: dtv 2000 ISBN 3-423-13135-7
- Ein Kapitel aus meinem Leben, Munich: Hanser 2004 ISBN 3-446-20531-4
- Das Gesicht wiederfinden. Über Schreiben, Schriftsteller und Judentum, Munich: Hanser 2006 ISBN 3-446-20681-7 & ISBN 978-3-446-20681-6
- Blick übers Tal. Zu Fotos von Arnold Zwahlen Basel/Weil am Rhein: Engeler 2007, ISBN 978-3-938767-38-2
- Das überirdische Licht: Rückkehr nach New York, Munich: Hanser 2008 ISBN 3-446-23085-8 & ISBN 978-3-446-23085-9
- Bilder von A., Munich: Hanser 2011 ISBN 3-446-23742-9 & ISBN 978-3-446-23742-1
- Chronik meiner Straße, Munich: Hanser 2015 ISBN 3-446-24762-9 & ISBN 978-3-446-24762-8

== Translations ==
- Lev Ustinov: Die Holz-Eisenbahn, Berlin 1979 (with Nelly Drechsler)
- Anna Akhmatova: Vor den Fenstern Frost, Berlin 1988 (with Fritz Mierau)
