= John Hemming (explorer) =

Canadian historian and explorer (born 1935)

John Hemming CMG FSA FRSL FRGS
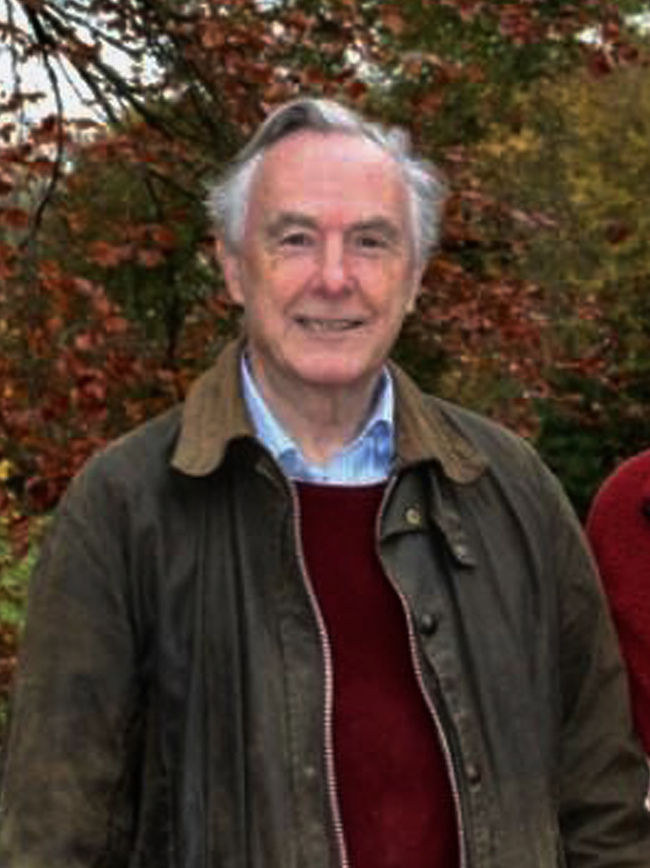
- Hemming in 2010
- Born: John Henry Hemming; 5 January 1935 (age 91); Vancouver, British Columbia, Canada
- Education: McGill University; University of Oxford
- Occupations: Anthropologist; historian; explorer
- Spouse: Susan (Sukie) Babington Smith (m. 1979)

John Henry Hemming CMG FSA FRSL FRGS (born January 5, 1935) is a historian, explorer, and expert on the Incas and indigenous peoples of the Amazon basin.

== Early life and education ==
Hemming, was born in Vancouver on 5 January 1935. His father, Henry Harold Hemming, served in the First World War and was wary of a Second World War on the horizon. As a result, he sent John's mother, journalist Alice Hemming, to Canada by way of the Panama Canal. John and his sister Louisa were brought back to London when he was two months old. He was educated in the United Kingdom at Eton College, in Canada at McGill University, and earned a doctorate at Oxford. He also became an honorary fellow of Magdalen College.

== Career ==
In 1961, with fellow Oxford graduates Richard Mason and Kit Lambert, he was part of the Iriri River Expedition into unexplored country in central Brazil. The Brazilian mapping agency, IBGE, sent a three-man survey team to help map these unknown forests and rivers and gave the Expedition permission to name features it found. However, after four months, an unknown indigenous people found the group's trail, laid an ambush, and killed Richard Mason with arrows and clubs. Mason was the last Englishman ever to be killed by a totally unknown and uncontacted tribe. His body was carried out and buried in the British cemetery in Rio de Janeiro. The tribe was contacted in 1973, and was called Panará: Hemming visited them in 1998.

His first book, The Conquest of the Incas, was published in 1970 and is still in print with two revisions. It won the Robert Pitman Literary Prize and the Christopher Award in New York. Hemming had spent the year 1960 travelling to every part of Peru, was for years chairman of the Anglo-Peruvian Society, and has been awarded Peru's two highest civilian honours: El Sol del Peru ('The Sun of Peru', South America's oldest order of chivalry) and the Grand Cross of the Orden al Merito Publico (Order of Merit). He has also written, with the American photographer Edward Ranney, an account of Inca architecture of Peru, Monuments of the Incas, reissued in a revised edition in 2010. Among those whom he inspired and befriended is Vince Lee, a fellow Andean explorer and writer.

His experience on the Iriri River expedition led to a heightened interest in Brazilian indigenous peoples. On various expeditions he visited 45 tribes throughout Brazil – four of them (Surui, Parakana, Asurini and Galera Nambikwara) at the time that Brazilian teams made the first-ever face-to-face contact. Over the following 26 years he completed a three-volume history of the indigenous peoples and exploration of the Brazilian Amazonia: Red Gold (1978), which covers the period of 1500–1760; Amazon Frontier (1985), covering the period of 1760–1910; and Die If You Must (2004), which describes their changes during the 20th century. The three volumes add up to over 2,100 pages.

In 1975, John Hemming became director and secretary of the Royal Geographical Society, a post he held until 1996. He personally led the Maracá Rainforest Project in Brazil (1987–88) which, with 200 scientists and scientific technicians, became the largest research project in Amazonia organised by any European country – in partnership with Brazilian researchers from INPA (Amazon Research Institute) and [SEMA environment agency. Hemming was awarded the RGS's Founder's Medal in recognition of his work on the Maracá project, as well as the Brazilian Ordem do Cruzeiro do Sul (Order of the Southern Cross) and medals from the Royal Scottish Geographical Society and the Boston Museum of Science (Bradford Washburn Medal).

In April 2008 his book, Tree of Rivers: The Story of the Amazon, was published by Thames and Hudson. It was described by Hugh Thomson in the Daily Telegraph as a book that "will stand as the definitive single-volume work on the subject." Another notable book was Naturalists in Paradise. Wallace, Bates and Spruce in the Amazon (2015).

== Personal life ==
In 1979, John Hemming married Susan (Sukie) Babington Smith, daughter of Michael Babington Smith and granddaughter of Sir Henry Babington Smith. She worked for many years in The National Trust, became Director of Development and then Director of Corporate Affairs at the British Museum, and on retirement a trustee of English Heritage. She is the great-granddaughter of 9th Earl of Elgin on her father's side and the great-great-granddaughter of the 4th Earl of Clanwilliam on her mother's side. They have two children: publisher Beatrice (born 1981) and writer Henry Hemming.

== Honours ==
In the 1994 New Year Honours, Hemming was appointed a Companion of the Order of St Michael and St George (CMG) by the British government. He was elected a Fellow of the Royal Society of Literature in 2013. In August 2018, he was awarded the President's Medal of the British Academy "for his work in the field of the colonial history and ethnography of Brazil and Peru, and the promotion of the protection of endangered societies".

== Bibliography ==
- (1970) Conquest of the Incas, London: Pan MacMillan
- (1973) Tribes of the Amazon Basin, Oxford: Oxford University Press
- (1978) The Search for El Dorado, London: Phoenix Books
- (1978) Red Gold: The Conquest of the Brazilian Indians, London: Pan Macmillan
- (1981) Machu Picchu, New York: Newsweek Books
- (1982) Monuments of the Incas, with Edward Ranney, New York: New York Graphic Society
- (1987) Amazon Frontier, London: Pan Macmillan
- (1993) Maracá: Rainforest Island, London: Macmillan
- (1998) The Golden Age of Discovery, London: Pavilion Books
- (2003) Die if You Must, London: Pan Macmillan
- (2008) Tree of Rivers: The Story of the Amazon, London: Thames and Hudson
- (2015) Naturalists in Paradise: Wallace, Bates and Spruce in the Amazon
- (2020) People of the Rainforest. The Villas Boas brothers, explorers and humanitarians of the Amazon, London: C Hurst & Co publishers

Awards
Preceded by Monica Kristensen Solås	Founder's Medal of the Royal Geographical Society; 1990	Succeeded by Andrew Goudie
Preceded by James Stevens Curl	President's Medal of the British Academy; 2018; With: Zeinab Badawi, Dame Frances Cairncross, William Dalrymple, and Andreas Gestrich	Succeeded by Ben Goldacre
Preceded by Claudia Hammond	President's Medal of the British Academy; 2018; With: Zeinab Badawi, Dame Frances Cairncross, William Dalrymple, and Andreas Gestrich	Succeeded by Ben Goldacre
Preceded by Katie Mitchell	President's Medal of the British Academy; 2018; With: Zeinab Badawi, Dame Frances Cairncross, William Dalrymple, and Andreas Gestrich	Succeeded by Ben Goldacre
Preceded by Helga Nowotny	President's Medal of the British Academy; 2018; With: Zeinab Badawi, Dame Frances Cairncross, William Dalrymple, and Andreas Gestrich	Succeeded by Ben Goldacre
Preceded by Jimmy Wales	President's Medal of the British Academy; 2018; With: Zeinab Badawi, Dame Frances Cairncross, William Dalrymple, and Andreas Gestrich	Succeeded by Ben Goldacre
