= National Minority Movement =

Former trade union of the United Kingdom

The National Minority Movement was a British organisation, established in 1924 by the Communist Party of Great Britain, which attempted to organise a radical presence within the existing trade unions. The organization was headed by longtime unionist Tom Mann and future General Secretary of the CPGB Harry Pollitt.

== Establishment ==
The National Minority Movement was established at a convention held on 23–24 August 1924, attended by 271 delegates, claiming to represent 200,000 workers. By the time of the NMM's formation in 1924, the Comintern had abandoned strategies based on the prospect of an imminent world revolution, in favour of slow, gradual working within established institutions, including "pure and simple" reformist trade unions. The aim of the NMM was to convert the revolutionary minority of the working class into a majority. The NMM would organise workers who were dissatisfied with the existing unions but unwilling to join the Communist Party as well as those who were already party members. The Communists would thus increase their influence in workers without splitting the existing organisations.

The NMM was affiliated to the Red International of Labour Unions (RILU). Its president, from 1924 to 1929, was the veteran trade union activist Tom Mann and its General Secretary, over the same period, was Harry Pollitt. Other prominent figures included Wal Hannington, in charge of organization of the metal workers until transferred by the party to work organising the unemployed, the engineer J. T. "Jack" Murphy and coal miners A. J. Cook, Arthur Horner and Nat Watkins.

The Organising Secretary of the NMM was George Hardy, and George Fletcher served as Treasurer.

The organisation appears to have been modelled after the American Trade Union Educational League, established by Communist trade union leader William Z. Foster in 1921. Both were divided into trade-related sections, the most important of which were the Mining MM (headed full-time by Watkins), the Metal Workers' MM (headed by Hannington), and the Transport MM (headed by Hardy).

An early success of the movement was the election of Minority Movement supporter A. J. Cook as General Secretary of the Miners Federation of Great Britain.

== Development ==
In January 1925, the NMM organised a conference on international trade union unity, attended by 617 delegates, representing 600,000 workers. Even though the RILU had softened its militant rhetoric calling for the destruction of the social-democratic Amsterdam International of trade unions, most of the Amsterdam International Federation of Trade Unions (IFTU) was in no mood to parlay with the Communist unionists from around the world, demanding that their affiliation with RILU be terminated before they could be accepted. Even though Soviet trade union chief Mikhail Tomsky went so far as to say that Soviet unions should consider affiliation with the Amsterdam International in a speech delivered in December 1925, no such union was forthcoming.

The 2nd Annual Conference of the National Minority Movement was held on 29 and 30 August 1925. The gathering was attended by 683 delegates, claiming to represent 750,000 workers. The Communist Party was pleased with the tremendous growth which the organisation seemed to be showing and NMM leader Harry Pollitt expressed optimism that his organisation could "capture" the Trade Unions Congress in fairly short order if it continued to develop along its current path.

In January 1926, a special meeting of the CPGB's Central Committee called for a renewed offensive of the working class against the capitalist state and the established organized labour movement. A special "National Conference of Action" was called for March of that same year, a gathering which was attended by 883 delegates from organizations claiming to represent 957,000 workers. The Miners' Minority Movement was particularly militant, propagandizing all branches of the Miners' Federation for the complete rejection of the Report of the Samuels Commission on the coal industry, which proposed wage reductions and reorganisation of the industry without nationalisation. The stage was set for a chain of events, which would culminate in the 1926 British General Strike.

In 1927, Percy Glading—later to be arrested and imprisoned for his role in directing the Woolwich spy ring, which passed military secrets to the Soviet Union—was elected NMM national organiser.

== End ==
Around 1929 the adoption of more radical Third Period strategies led the Communist Party to alter its approach towards unions entirely. Instead of the "boring from within" strategy employed by the NMM and similar organizations in other countries, a move was made towards the support of unofficial strikes and alternative "dual" unions. The NMM attempted to set itself up as a federation of such groups outside the existing unions rather than its previous purpose as a pressure group within those unions.
