= Henry Hemming =

English author

- Hemming in 2024
- Born: December 1979 (age 46)
- Education: Newcastle University (BA)
- Occupations: Journalist, writer
- Spouse: Helena Merriman
- Relatives: John Hemming (father)
- Writing career
- Genre: Investigative journalism

Henry Hemming (born December 1979) is an English non-fiction author. In 2017 it was announced that his book, M: Maxwell Knight, MI5's Greatest Spymaster, based on the life of Maxwell Knight, would be adapted for television by Mammoth Screen with screenwriter Matt Charman attached as lead writer.

In order to write the book about Knight, Hemming reviewed declassified MI5 files, interviewed former MI5 agents as well as some of Knight's family.

== Personal life ==
Henry Hemming is married to the BBC radio presenter Helena Merriman. They have two children and live in London. He is the son of John Hemming, explorer, author and former Director of the Royal Geographical Society, and Sukie Hemming, former Director of Development at the British Museum.

== Selected publications ==
- Offscreen: Four Young Artists in the Middle East. Booth-Clibborn Editions, 2004. ISBN 978-1861542717
- Misadventure in the Middle East: Travels as a Tramp, Artist and Spy. Nicholas Brealey Publishing, 2007.
- In Search of the English Eccentric: A Journey. John Murray, 2008. ISBN 978-0719522123
- Together: How Small Groups Achieve Big Things. John Murray, 2011. ISBN 978-1848540552
- Churchill's Iceman: The True Story of Geoffrey Pyke: Genius, Fugitive, Spy. Preface Publishing, 2014. ISBN 978-1848094437
- M: Maxwell Knight, MI5's Greatest Spymaster. Preface Publishing, 2017. ISBN 978-1848094673
- Agents of Influence. PublicAffairs, 2019. ISBN 978-1541742147
- Four Shots in the Night: A True Story of Spies, Murder, and Justice in Northern Ireland. London: Quercus. 2024. ISBN 978-1529426755.
