= Litzi Friedmann =

Austrian spy (1910–1991)

- Born: Alice Kohlmann; 1910; Vienna, Austria-Hungary
- Died: 1991 (aged 80–81)
- Spouse(s): Karl Friedmann (m. 1931; sep. 1932) Kim Philby (m. 1934; div. 1946)
- Children: Barbara Honigmann

Alice Friedmann (née Kohlmann; 1910–1991), known as Litzi Friedmann, was an Austrian communist who was the first wife of Kim Philby, a member of the Cambridge Five. Records identify her as the Soviet agent with the code name Mary.

== Early life ==
Friedmann was born in Vienna to Israel and Gisella Kohlman in 1910.

In 1931, Kohlmann married Karl Friedmann. They separated one year later but did not divorce until Philby asked for a divorce in 1946.

== Political activity ==
Still living in Vienna, Friedmann joined the Communist Party of Austria (KPÖ) and worked for the Moscow-led European underground. She was imprisoned for several weeks in 1933 for her Communist Party affiliation; in this year, the KPÖ became an underground organisation. Friedmann had a wide network of Communist connections across Europe, including to Soviet intelligence. She was also in a romantic relationship with Gábor Péter (Benjámin Eisenberger), who was then married to another woman.

In February 1934, the government of Engelbert Dollfuss began a further crackdown on known leftists. Working with Kim Philby, Friedmann smuggled activists out of Vienna through the sewer system.

The couple married in Vienna on 24 February, partly so Philby's British citizenship could protect Friedmann from the Austrian police. An account stated that the marriage was pushed by Friedmann's father for this purpose. According to some sources, Teddy Kollek, later the Mayor of Jerusalem, was present at the wedding.

In 1934, the Socialist movement collapsed, and the couple left Vienna for London in April to live with Philby's mother. Friedmann had a friend in London who was working for Soviet intelligence, the photographer and fellow Viennese Edith Tudor-Hart. Due to her work, Hart had extensive contacts in British society and was involved in the Soviet recruitment while helping facilitate the relations between the Communist Party of Great Britain and the Soviet embassy. Guy Burgess used both Friedmann and Hart as couriers to the NKVD's Paris station. One biographer of Philby, Genrikh Borovik, who had access to the Soviet archives, says that Tudor-Hart recommended Friedmann and Philby as suitable candidates for NKVD recruitment.

Friedmann and Philby split up in the 1930s – some sources claim that Philby had to distance himself from known communists to penetrate the British establishment. However, they remained in contact for years afterwards and divorced only in 1946.

In 1946, after the war, Friedmann and the German-Jewish refugee Georg Honigmann lived in East Berlin, where Honigmann became editor of the Berliner Zeitung.

== Death and legacy ==
Friedmann died in 1991. Her daughter, German writer Barbara Honigmann, wrote a biography of her mother.

Friedmann appears as a character in Cambridge Spies, a 2003 BBC drama based on the story of the Cambridge Five. She is played by Lisa Dillon.
