= All Russian Co-operative Society =

1920s trade organisation in UK

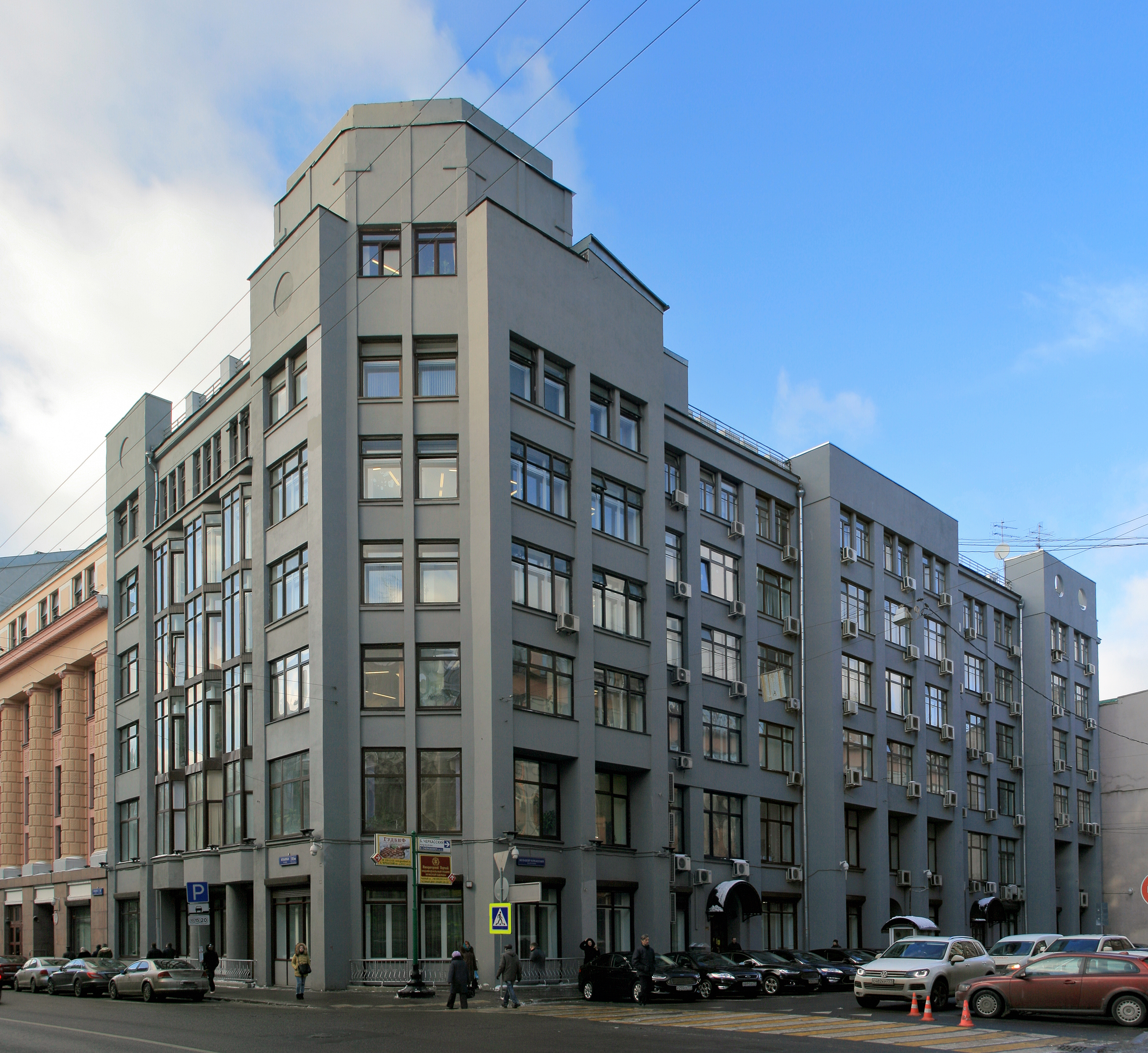
Head office in Ilyinka Street, Moscow, erected 1927–1928 on a design by Vladimir Mayat

The All-Russian Co-operative Society (ARCOS or ARKOS, Russian: АРКОС) was the principal body responsible for orchestrating Anglo-Soviet trade in the early days of the Soviet Union, following the development of Vladimir Lenin's New Economic Policy. Its headquarters was located in Hampstead, London. In 1927 the organisation was raided by British authorities, who accused the company as serving as a front for subversive activities.

== Origins ==
The All-Russian Co-operative Society, Ltd., began operations in London in October 1920. The name "Arcos" is an acronym deriving from the formal name of the company: All-Russian Co-operative Society, although in the contemporary press the name was typically capitalised as would be a proper name (i.e. "ARCOS").

Arcos was established as the official buying and selling agency of the Soviet government in the United Kingdom, and was a British company, operating under British law, although the stockholders were all Soviet citizens.

Arcos made £1,970,000 worth of purchases during the calendar year 1920, with payment for its purchases made in gold via the city of Reval (now known as Tallinn) in Estonia. The company bought an additional £3,650,000 worth of products during the first 8 months of 1921. Chief among its purchases were food, textiles, and coal, although a rather limited quantity of agricultural machinery was also obtained. The company was also the conduit for the sale of over £300,000 worth of Russian produce up to August 1921, primarily flax, but also including timber, manganese, and furs.

== Arcos Bank ==
On 29 May 1923, the Managing Board of Arcos decided to establish its own bank to handle the financial transactions of the organisation. In accordance with this decision the Arcos Banking Corporation, Ltd. – commonly known as the Arcos Bank – was launched on 5 July 1923, with £250,000 in working capital. Arcos Bank was a separate legal entity and ostensibly operated independently of the Arcos trading company. All funds involved in the import or export of commodities of the Soviet Union were to be controlled by this new institution.

In addition to handling the transmission of funds used in the import and export trade, Arcos Bank issued traveller's cheques for those visiting the USSR. These were to be payable in the new gold-backed chervonets currency at any state bank of the Soviet Union.

According to its financial statement, during its first 6 months of operation the Arcos Bank facilitated approximately £100,000,000 worth of activity.

== Espionage ==
The suspicions of MI5 that Arcos was acting as a cover organisation for espionage activity were first aroused in 1925 when John Ottaway had tailed a suspect back to the Moorgate offices. The suspect Ottaway was following, Walter Dale, then went to the offices of the Federated Press, a Communist-controlled news agency for the American labour press which served as a journalistic cover for left-wing espionage in the UK. MI5 tapped the telephone lines of the FPA which revealed a raft of calls not only to Arcos but also suspected Soviet intelligence operatives, while interception of its post revealed copies of classified French dispatches.

=== Arcos affair of 1927 ===
On 31 March 1927, the Secret Intelligence Service (MI6) passed evidence to MI5, courtesy of an informant inside Arcos, that Arcos had illegally procured and copied a classified Signals Training manual from the Aldershot military base. The British secret service also had testimony that the basement of 49 Moorgate contained photostat apparatus, for the purpose of photographing stolen secret documents.

At 16:20 on 12 May 1927, a large force of uniformed and plain-clothes police officers entered the headquarters of Arcos and the Soviet Trade Delegation, located at 49 Moorgate in London known as the Russia House or Soviet House. The police took possession of the telephone exchange, detained all employees, and made a thorough search of documents on the premises. Drilling machinery was brought in to open locked rooms and strongboxes. They immediately proceeded to the basement they had been tipped off about, recovered numerous classified documents, found it to be rigged with numerous anti-intruder devices and notices forbidding entry, for which the employees had no satisfactory explanation.

A secret cypher room was discovered, that had no door handle and could only be entered with a key, wherein workers were hurriedly engaged in burning papers. A struggle then ensued when police tried to wrest remaining papers from staff. The chief of this room then attempted to pocket a list, which on inspection detailed cover addresses used for secret communication with the communist parties of the North and South American, African and Australasian continents. A considerable number of documents were removed from the building in the course of the investigation. The raid and subsequent diplomatic incident subsequently became known as the Arcos affair.

The next day, the Soviet Embassy handed in an official note of protest, stressing the illegality of the raid on Arcos headquarters. It was noted by the Soviet government that the Chairman of the Trade Delegation, Mr. Khinchuk, was protected by diplomatic immunity in accord with the Anglo-Soviet Trade Agreement of 16 March 1921.

In an attempt to provide justification for the raid on Arcos, Prime Minister Stanley Baldwin read aloud in the House of Commons from a handful of deciphered telegrams, specifically one mentioning Comintern agent Mikhail Borodin, that proved Soviet guilt of espionage. Baldwin admitted that these telegrams were not acquired in the Arcos raid, but stated they were evidence that the Soviet Union was using the organisation for the conduct of "military espionage and subversive activities throughout the British Empire and North and South America". As a result of this the Soviets, now aware that the British secret services had been intercepting their communications, changed their encryption cyphers for all diplomatic communication. They adopted the virtually unbreakable one-time-pad system, therefore eliminating the ability of the British Government Code and Cypher School to decipher any high grade Soviet messages from 1927 until the end of the Second World War.

Britain severed diplomatic and economic ties with Soviet Union shortly after the incident in late May 1927, marking the end of the Anglo-Soviet Trade Agreement, and a war scare swept the Soviet Union.

Despite the highly publicised raid of Arcos and the manpower and time put into the operation, little of practical import resulted from the raid. Historian Louis Fischer noted of the Arcos raid:

It disclosed nothing that had not been known before, and failed to produce the highly important War Office documents the rumored theft of which served as excuse for the raid. The official White Paper containing the documents found in the raid was thin evidence indeed, and led to no arrests or charges for illegal or subversive activities by Russian or British subjects.

During its six years of existence, Arcos did approximately £100,000,000 in trade between Britain and the Soviet Union.

== See also ==
- Campbell Case
- Zinoviev letter
- 1926 General Strike
- Nanking incident of 1927
- The Soviet War Scare (1926-27)
- Woolwich spy ring
- Amtorg Trading Corporation aka AMTORG (NYC)
- Russian Soviet Government Bureau aka Soviet Bureau (NYC)
