= George Hardy (communist) =

English communist

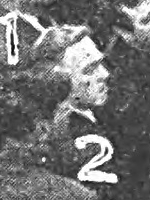
Hardy in 1928

George Hardy (26 July 1884, Cottingham – 4 May 1966) was an English communist. He was General Secretary of the Industrial Workers of the World in 1921 and later secretary of the National Minority Movement.

== Biography ==
Hardy was the son of an English agricultural labourer. From the age of 17 he took an active part in the trade union movement. In 1906 Hardy emigrated to Canada, where he organized a union of seafarers' workers, which joined the Industrial Workers of the World (I. W. W.); for a long time he was the chairman of this union. In 1912-13 he traveled to Australia, New Zealand and England as an agitator, where in 1915-16 he led a strike of dockworkers. Arriving then in the United States, he again began to lead the movement of workers in sea transport. He actively campaigned against the war and served a year in prison for that. In 1920 he was elected secretary of the I. W. W. in Seattle and as its representative was sent to the international conference of anarcho-syndicalists in Berlin. From here he went to the USSR, where he joined the Profintern. Returning to the US, began campaigning to join the Profintern; on this basis, he broke with I. W. W. In 1921 he became a member of the American Communist Party, the next year he moved to England, where he became one of the organizers and leaders of the minority movement. Hardy did most of his work among transport workers; in 1925 he led a strike of British sailors. Hardy was a delegate from the minority movement to the 2nd, 3rd and 4th Congresses of the Profintern. At the 4th Congress he was elected a member of the Executive Bureau of the Profintern.

=== In China ===
In 1927 he went to China as a Comintern agent. He arrived in Hangzhou when Chiang Kai-shek was initiating his attacks on the Chinese Communist Party (CCP), particularly through the Shanghai Massacre. He remained in China working underground with the CCP and the All-China Federation of Trade Unions. Hardy returned to China in 1951 as part of the British-China Friendship Association.

In 1953 Hardy entered into correspondence with Elizabeth Gurley Flynn who he had known in 1923. He renewed their relationship after Flynn had been jailed under the Smith Act.

In 1956, Hardy returned from his third trip from China to Moscow. Here he learned about the decision to publish his book Those Stormy Years: Memories of the Fight for Freedom on Five Continents in Russian. For which he wrote a new foreword and another chapter on fresh impressions after a trip to China.

== Texts ==
- (1920) "Shop Organization the Base of the I. W. W." One Big Union Monthly June 1920
- (1956) Those Stormy Years: Memories of the Fight for Freedom on Five Continents London:Lawrence and Wishart
