= Donbass (ship) =

Soviet Emba-class tanker

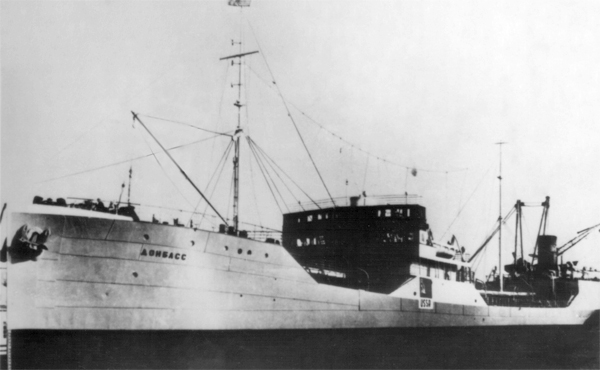

History

Soviet Union
- Name: Donbass
- Namesake: Donbas
- Owner: Northern Fleet
- Operator: Sovtanker (1940); Far-Eastern Shipping Company (1940–1942)
- Port of registry: Murmansk (1941–1942)
- Builder: André Marti Shipyard No. 198
- Laid down: 1930
- Launched: November 1932
- Completed: 1935
- Fate: Torpedoed and sunk, 7 November 1942

General characteristics
- Class & type: Emba-class tanker
- Tonnage: 7,661 GRT; 11,450 DWT
- Length: 140.12 m (459 ft 9 in)
- Beam: 17.94 m (58 ft 10 in)
- Draught: 8.45 m (27 ft 9 in)
- Propulsion: 2 shafts; 2 diesel engines
- Speed: 12 knots (22 km/h; 14 mph)
- Crew: 63

Donbass (Russian: Донбасс) was a Soviet Emba-class tanker sunk by the German destroyer Z27 on 7 November 1942, when it was on its way from Arkhangelsk to Reykjavík.

The case aroused considerable later interest due to the widely held assertion that the Soviet spy Arnold Deutsch was among the passengers killed in the attack, and that he was at the time bound for an espionage mission in the Western Hemisphere.

== Legacy ==
Three American tankers received by the Soviet Union through the Lend-Lease were renamed in her honor.

== Bibliography ==
- Jordan, Roger W. (1999). The World's Merchant Fleets, 1939: The Particulars and Wartime Fates of 6,000 ships. London: Chatham Publishing. ISBN 1-86176-023-X.
