= Maxwell Knight =

British spymaster, naturalist, broadcaster (1900–1968)

Charles Henry Maxwell Knight OBE, known as Maxwell Knight, (9 July 1900 – 27 January 1968) was a British spymaster, naturalist and broadcaster, reputedly a model for the James Bond character "M". He played major roles in surveillance of an early British Fascist party as well as the Communist Party of Great Britain.

== Background ==
Knight was the son of Hugh Coleraine Knight, a solicitor, and his wife, Ada Phyllis (née Hancock). He was christened in Holy Innocents Church, South Norwood on 3 August 1900.

== Career ==
=== Military Service ===
He saw service during the First World War. Having been a naval cadet, he was appointed to the temporary rank of Midshipman in the Royal Naval Reserve on 2 May 1918.

In July 1918 he attended a hydrophone officers' course, and in August served for a short time as First Class Hydrophone Officer aboard the trawler, Ninus. On 1 September 1918 he was appointed to the armed merchant cruiser, HMS Andes. In December 1918 Captain C.T.H. Cooper of the Andes described him as "a promising young officer." He was demobilised in February 1919.

=== Teacher and Freelance Journalist ===
Having left the navy, he worked as a teacher in a preparatory school and as a freelance journalist.

=== Sir George Makgill's Industrial Intelligence Bureau [IIB] ===
In an unpublished memoir in the MI5 Archives, Knight recalled that he joined the first of the Fascist Movements in Britain, Rotha Lintorn-Orman's British Fascisti, in 1924:

"at the request of the late Sir George Makgill who was then running agents on behalf of Sir Vernon Kell, Director General of the British Security Service, MI5. I remained with this organisation until 1930 when it more or less became ineffectual. My association with this body was at all times for the purposes of obtaining information for HM Government and also for the purposes of finding likely people who might be used by this department for the same purposes."

He served as the BF's assistant chief of staff and director of intelligence until 1930. Between 1924 and 1925 Knight arranged for six British Fascists to infiltrate the Communist Party of Great Britain to work as covert human intelligence for Makgill's IIB acting on behalf of MI5.

Sir George Makgill died suddenly in October 1926 without one of his agents knowing the full range of his covert intelligence gathering activities. The IIB, the intelligence work of the British Fascists, and the development in Britain of an international intelligence network within the transnational anti-communist right had all been the responsibility of a single section of Makgill's unnamed organisation run by John Baker White

According to his own account Baker White became the leader of this section which he called "Section D" in 1923 at the time of Makgill's death was a full time employee of The Economic League. Other members of section D included Maxwell Knight, two years older than 24 years old Baker White and Rotha Lintorn-Orman, seven years older, and co-founder with her mother of the British Fascisti (quickly renamed the British Fascists).

Section D would continue to operate until the out break of War in 1939. the industrial intelligence would become subsumed into the work of the Economic League, which was also the British section of the International Entente Against The Third International. Knight continued to run the network of British Fascist undercover agents until 1929.

=== MI6 – the Secret Service ===
Throughout the first part of the 1920s, and largely driven by successive governments' reluctance reverse the post war cuts to the domestic intelligence service, MI6 were lobby the House of Commons Secret Service for a single domestic and overseas Intelligence service, which they would dominate because of the cuts to the size of MI5. This was never endorsed by the committee. But in 1925 when the head of MI6, Admiral Sinclair, told the Committee that because of MI5s inability to run agents that they were having to run agents in the UK nothing was done to prevent this.

Desmond Morton was the head of Section V of MI6 responsible for Industrial and Political Intelligence, where most of the domestic agent running occurred. Morton had been told by Nesta Webster (a longstanding and well-known anti-socialist and antisemitic campaigner and family friend of John Baker White about the work of Knight's network of fascist agents. In December 1929 Knight and his agents were recruited into MI6. Morton reported the recruitment to Sinclair:

"[Knight] makes an excellent impression, is clearly perfectly honest, and at need prepared to do anything, but is at the same time not wild. When required by his previous masters, he and two friends burgled, three nights running, the premises of the local committee of the Communist Party in Scotland, the branch of the Labour Research Department there and the Y[oung] C[ommunist] L[eague] HQ."

=== MI5 ===
In 1931 the House of Commons Secret Service Committee was convened to resolve the difficulties between MI6 and Scotland Yard and about responsibility for agent running and counter espionage especially about Knight's team, Scotland Yard's own penetration by agents. The upshot was the all responsibility for UK agent running counter espionage was immediately transferred to MI5 and this included Knight and his team.

In time Knight became MI5's chief 'agent runner', being deployed principally against the Communist Party. He rose to be head of section B5(b), responsible for infiltrating agents into potentially subversive groups. Initially, he ran the Section from his flat in Sloane Street but later, he did so for years from 308, Hood House, Dolphin Square in London, again separate from the rest of MI5.

The most prolific agents that Knight recruited were women, including Kathleen Tesch, Olga Grey and Mona Maund who managed to infiltrate the Communist Party, according to Hemming's 2017 biography of Knight.

Joan Miller, who was recruited as an agent by Knight and had a close personal relationship with him, remembered that he felt very deeply about the threat of Communism: "his views on this subject, you might say, amounted almost to an obsession. He was equally adamant in his aversion to Jews and homosexuals, but prepared to suspend these prejudices in certain cases. 'Bloody Jews' was one of his expressions (you have only to read the popular novels of the period—thrillers in particular—to understand just how widespread this particular prejudice was)."

Notwithstanding this, Miller imagined Knight himself was a homosexual, although his third wife, Susi Maxwell Knight, rejected the allegation. Miller wrote that Knight was also:

"neurotic, anti-Semitic and obsessed with the occult" but in the 2017 biography, Henry Hemming claims that Miller's statements were "fantastical". Hemming does state that Knight was a virulent anti-communist and that none of his three marriages was consummated.

A respected case officer, Knight achieved successes with the infiltration of political groups, leading to the internment and imprisonment of fascists and fascist sympathisers regarded as a threat to the United Kingdom, such as Albert Williams, George Whomack, Anna Wolkoff, Tyler Kent, leading antisemite, Captain Archibald Maule Ramsay MP, Oswald Mosley, along with communists, such as Percy Glading.

During his career with MI5, Knight found that there was "a very long standing and ill-founded prejudice against the employment of women as agents", a position with which he did not agree. Indeed, many of his best agents were women. Agents working under him included Olga Gray (who infiltrated the leadership of the Communist Party of Great Britain), and Joan Miller (who "penetrated the anti-semitic underworld of British Fascism").

His early warnings of communist infiltration of MI5 were not taken seriously. Patricia Craig notes that his paper, "The Comintern is not dead", which predicted with great accuracy the developments in Russia's policy with regard to Britain after the war, "was dismissed as 'over-theoretical' by Roger Hollis, and various other Soviet experts considered it unimpressive." Moreover, when, in 1941 Anthony Blunt informed Harry Pollitt that Tom Driberg was an informer, and Driberg was expelled from the Communist Party, Knight developed the suspicion that his unit had been infiltrated by the KGB, but Blunt's treachery remained undiscovered for some years.

A failure of Knight's section was the entrapment of Ben Greene, an anti-war activist, interned on the orders of the then Home Secretary, Sir John Anderson, as a result of false evidence given by Knight's agent provocateur, Harald Kurtz.

Having been gazetted as a Second Lieutenant on the Special List in September 1939, Knight was given the army rank of Major during the Second World War, but designated as a "Civil Assistant, General Staff, War Office." He was appointed as an Officer of the Civil Division of the Order of the British Empire in June 1943.

Ian Fleming, the author of the James Bond series of books, used an amalgam of Knight and his former superior Rear Admiral John Henry Godfrey, Director of the Naval Intelligence Division, as a model for the character "M," Bond's boss. However, based on his research, Knight's biographer Henry Hemming made this comment: "To my mind Admiral John Godfrey was the main inspiration for the personality of Fleming's M, yet the name of Fleming's character can be traced back to Maxwell Knight".

=== BBC ===
In 1946, Knight, who had been an ardent naturalist since childhood, began what was to become a successful broadcasting career on BBC radio, appearing in, and hosting such programmes as Naturalist, Country Questions and Nature Parliament. He appeared occasionally on television: in Peter Scott's Look and in Animal, Vegetable or Mineral.

Knight conducted his broadcasting career alongside his work in intelligence, until 1956, when he retired early from MI5, on the grounds of ill health, suffering from angina.

Knight, who wrote of his pet cuckoo, 'Goo', in A Cuckoo in the House (1955), was "one of many agents feeding into the phenomenon of British spies being bird enthusiasts. 'Birdwatcher' is old intelligence slang for spy. And the cuckoo – which infiltrates and imitates – was an ideal muse for a spy like Knight."

Fellow naturalist and Knight enthusiast, Helen Macdonald, writes that "the cuckoo's life beautifully mirrored the concerns of Knight's own. First, its sex life was mysterious and secretive. So was Knight's: for years, he'd maintained a hearty heterosexual facade while picking up rough trade in local cinemas and employing local motorcycle mechanics for reasons other than repairing motorcycles. Second, cuckoos were the avian equivalents of the officer-controller of penetration agents; they 'insinuated' their 'chameleon eggs' into the nests of their 'dupes'."

Spies and birders, she writes elsewhere, "have the same skills, the ability to identify, recognise, be unobtrusive, invisible, hide. You pay careful attention to your surroundings. You never feel part of the crowd."

== Personal life and death ==
Knight was married in Sherborne Abbey on 29 December 1925 to Gwladys Evelyn Amy Poole. Knight married Lois Mary Coplestone in 1937, and later married Susan Barnes ("Susi") in 1944. Knight's biography indicates that he was a jazz aficionado, had a significant interest in exotic animals and was an ardent fascist.

Knight retired from the Security Service in 1961. By then he had made over 300 radio broadcasts, had appeared in 40 television programmes and had penned numerous books about natural history and animals.

Knight spent his last years at "The Wing", Josselyns, Midgham, near Reading in Berkshire, where he died from heart failure on 24 January 1968, aged 67.

== Legacy ==
After his death, the Maxwell Knight Memorial Fund was set up, which provided for the Maxwell Knight Young Naturalists' Library in the education centre of the Natural History Museum. After Knight's death, a wildlife memorial fund was established in his name, headed by David Attenborough and Peter Scott.

Knight's biographer makes this comment about the spymaster's legacy:

Perhaps his greatest achievement in MI5 was to help destroy British Fascism during the Second World War ... He also changed the way female agents were seen within MI5, and he helped to transform the government's understanding of the British Communist movement. Other highlights include his work on the Woolwich Arsenal Spy Ring, his penetration of the Right Club and the prosecution of Tyler Kent and Anna Wolkoff.

On the other hand, Henry Hemming's 2017 biography states that Knight was responsible for warning William Joyce in 1939 that he was to be arrested, allowing the latter to move to Germany where he was renowned for his wartime propaganda broadcasts as "Lord Haw-Haw".

In October 2015, a hitherto unpublished 50,000-word manuscript, entitled "The Frightened Face of Nature", written by Knight in 1964, and discovered by Professor John E. Cooper and Simon H. King in Knight's personal filing cabinet, was published in The Guardian, under the headline, "Spectre of destruction": The Lost Manuscript of the Real-Life 'M'.

== Published works ==
He published 34 books and wrote many magazine articles on nature topics.

=== Detective fiction ===
- Crime Cargo. London: Philip Allan. 1934.
- Gunman's Holiday. London: Philip Allan. 1935. dedicated to Dennis Wheatley and his wife Joan.

=== Natural history ===
- The Young Naturalists Field Guide. G. Bell. 1952.
- Bird Gardening: How to Attract Birds. London: Routledge & Kegan Paul. 1954.
- A Cuckoo in the House. Methuen. 1955.
- Frogs, Toads and Newts in Britain. Brockhampton Press. 1962.
- Reptiles in Britain. Heinemann. 1965.
- Pets and their Problems. Heinemann. 1968.
- Be a Nature Detective. Warne. 1969.
- Maxwell Knight Replies. 225 Natural History Questions Answered. Illustrated by Rona Cloy. London: Routledge & Kegan Paul. 1959.
- Taming and Handling Animals. London. G Bell. 1959. n.

== See also ==
- John Bingham, 7th Baron Clanmorris
- Eric Roberts (spy)
