= Edith Tudor-Hart =

Austrian-British photographer and spy

- Born: Edith Suschitzky; 28 August 1908; Vienna, Austria
- Died: 12 May 1973 (aged 64); Brighton, England
- Education: Bauhaus, Dessau
- Occupations: Photographer, spy
- Espionage activity
- Allegiance: Soviet Union
- Service years: 1925–195?
- Codename: Edith

Edith Tudor-Hart (née Suschitzky; 28 August 1908 – 12 May 1973) was an Austrian-British photographer and spy for the Soviet Union. Brought up in a family of socialists, she trained in photography at Walter Gropius's Bauhaus in Dessau, and carried her political ideals through her art. Through her connections with Arnold Deutsch, Tudor-Hart was instrumental in the recruiting of the Cambridge Spy ring which damaged British intelligence from World War II until the security services discovered all their identities by the mid-1960s. She recommended Litzi Friedmann and Kim Philby for recruitment by the KGB and acted as an intermediary for Anthony Blunt and Bob Stewart when the rezidentura at the Soviet Embassy in London suspended its operations in February 1940.

== Early life and education ==
Her father, Wilhelm Suschitzky (1877–1934), was a social democrat who was born into the Jewish community in Vienna, but had renounced Judaism and become an atheist. He opened the first social democratic bookshop in Vienna (later to become a publishers). Tudor-Hart's brother, a filmmaker and a photographer like his sister, Wolfgang Suschitzky described their father as "a great man. I realised that later on in life, not so much when I saw him every day. But, I met interesting people, some of his authors who came and had lunch with us or met people who came to his shop." Suschitzky recalled boyhood memories of the family excitement that greeted the Russian Revolution in 1917.

She studied photography at the Bauhaus in Dessau in 1928 before working in Vienna, taking photographs of working class districts while a Montessori kindergarten teacher. An anti-fascist activist and Communist, she saw photography as a tool for disseminating her political ideas.

Her brother also became a well-known photographer and cinematographer in Britain. He cited his sister as an influence on his decision to pursue an artistic career over a scientific one.

In 1933 she married medical doctor Alex Tudor-Hart, whom she had met in 1925. She was described "by those who knew her in her youth as immensely vivacious, amusing, curious, and gifted". The couple fled to London, England in 1933, so that she could avoid prosecution and persecution in Austria for her Communist activities and Jewish background.

== South Wales ==
Following her marriage, she moved to South Wales where her husband practised as a GP in the area of Rhondda Valley, she began to produce photographs for The Listener, Arbeiter-Illustrierte-Zeitung, Der Kuckuck, The Social Scene and Design Today, dealing with issues such as refugees from the Spanish Civil War and industrial decline in the north-east of England. From the late 1930s, she concentrated more on social needs, such as housing policy and the care of disabled children. This change in work may have been because after separation from her husband who had just returned from the Spanish Civil War, their son, Tommy, developed schizophrenia.

== Spying activities ==
Tudor-Hart was instrumental in recruiting members of the Cambridge Spy ring, which damaged British intelligence from World War II through to its discovery in the late 1960s. While working as a photographer she also acted as a courier. Her rather unsubtle codename was "Edith". Tudor-Hart had met Arnold Deutsch in Vienna in 1926, and with him she worked in the OMS, the International Liaison Department of the Comintern.

Tudor-Hart was placed under surveillance by Special Branch after October 1931 when she was observed attending a demonstration in Trafalgar Square. Tudor-Hart was of interest because of her friendship with Litzi Friedmann, made when she moved to London. Arnold Deutsch discussed with Edith and Litzi the recruitment of Soviet spies. Litzi suggested her husband, Kim Philby with whom she had arrived in London from Vienna in May 1934. Tudor-Hart had spotted him as a potential Communist agent during his stay in Vienna, where he was a sympathiser of the Social Democrats who waged a civil war against the government of Engelbert Dollfuss. According to her report on Philby's file, through her own contacts with the Austrian underground Tudor Hart ran a swift check for the NKVD and, when this proved positive introduced him to "Otto" (Deutsch's code name). Deutsch immediately recommended... "that he pre-empt the standard operating procedure by authorising a preliminary personal sounding out of Philby." She also helped to recruit Arthur Wynn in 1936.

She acted as an intermediary for Anthony Blunt and Bob Stewart when the rezidentura at the Soviet Embassy in London suspended its operations in February 1940. In 1938–39 Burgess used her to contact Russian intelligence in Paris.

== Later life ==
She separated from her husband and had a breakdown. After the Second World War, she opened an antique shop in Brighton. She died of stomach cancer in Brighton on 12 May 1973.

== Bibliography ==
- Forbes, Duncan (2005). "Politics, photography and exile in the life of Edith Tudor-Hart (1908–1973)". In Behr, Shulamith; Malet, Marian (eds.). Arts in Exile in Britain, 1933–1945: Politics and Cultural Identity. Amsterdam: Rodopi. ISBN 978-90-420-1786-3.
- Forbes, Duncan, ed. (2013). Edith Tudor-Hart: In the Shadow of Tyranny. Ostfildern: Hatje Cantz. ISBN 978-3-7757-3567-4. Catalogue for an exhibition in Edinburgh, Vienna, and Berlin
- Jungk, Peter Stephan (2015). Die Dunkelkammern der Edith Tudor-Hart: Geschichten eines Lebens. Frankfurt am Main: S. Fischer Verlag. ISBN 9783100023988.
- Tudor-Hart, Edith; Suschitzky, Wolf (text) (1987). The Eye of Conscience. The Photo Pocket Book. Vol. 1. London: Nishen. ISBN 1-85378-401-X.
- Daybelge, Leyla; Pirker, Stefanie (2024). Through a Bauhaus Lens. Edith Tudor-Hart and Isokon. London / Salzburg: Isokon Gallery Trust / FOTOHOF. ISBN 978-1-7385161-0-0.

== Exhibitions ==
- 1987: Edith Tudor Hart. A Retrospective (1930–1952), Liverpool
- 2013: Edith Tudor-Hart. In the Shadow of Tyranny, National Galleries Scotland, Edinburgh
- 2020: Edith Tudor-Hart. Moving & Growing, FOTOHOF>ARCHIV, Salzburg
- 2024: Edith Tudor-Hart. A Steady Eye in Turbulent Times. Curated by Stefanie Pirker. FOTOHOF, Salzburg

== Documentary film ==
- Tracking Edith (2016), written and directed by Peter Stephan Jungk
