= Flora Murray =

Scottish physician and suffragette (1869–1923)

Flora Murray CBE
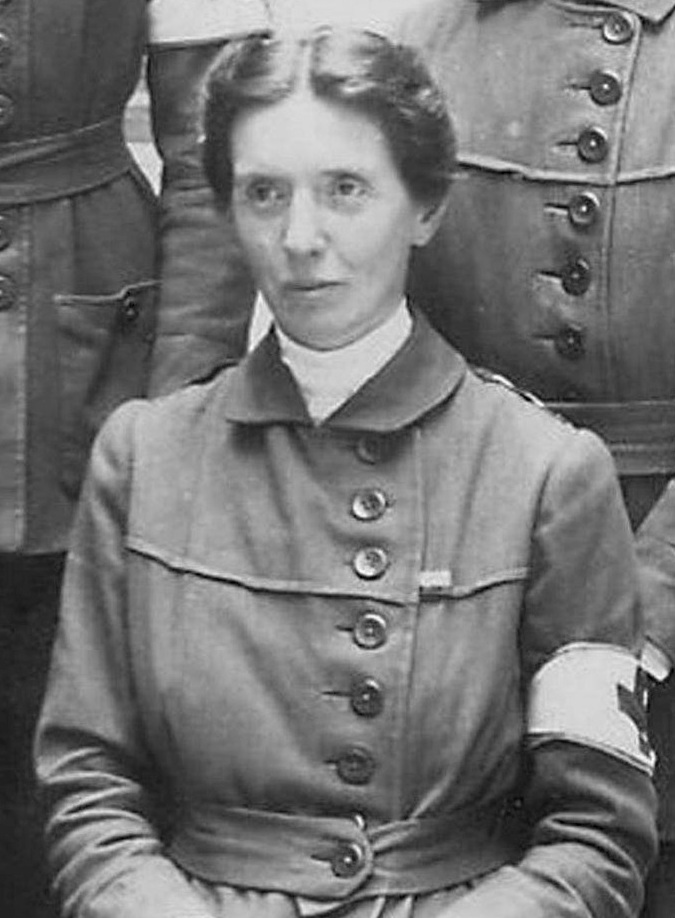
- Flora Murray in 1914
- Born: 8 May 1869; Murraythwaite, Dalton, Dumfriesshire, Scotland
- Died: 28 July 1923 (aged 54); Belsize Park, London, England
- Education: London School of Medicine for Women; Durham University
- Occupation: physician
- Known for: suffragette
- Relatives: Louisa Garrett Anderson (partner)

Flora Murray CBE (8 May 1869 – 28 July 1923) was a Scottish medical pioneer, and a member of the Women's Social and Political Union suffragettes. From 1914 to the end of her life, she lived with her partner and fellow doctor Louisa Garrett Anderson.

== Early life and education ==
Murray was born on 8 May 1869 at Murraythwaite, Dumfries, Scotland, the daughter of Grace Harriet Murray (née Graham) and John Murray, a landowner and Royal Navy captain. Murray was the fourth of six children.

Murray attended school in Germany and London before attending the London Hospital in Whitechapel in 1890, as a probationer nurse, for a six-month course. Murray decided on her career in medicine and went on to study in the London School of Medicine for Women in 1897. She then worked as a Medical assistant for 18 months at an asylum at the Crichton Royal Institution in Dumfriesshire. This experience was crucial in her writing of her MD thesis called 'Asylum Organization and Management' (1905). She completed her medical education at Durham University, receiving her MB BSc in 1903, and MD in 1905. She received a Diploma in Public Health from the University of Cambridge in 1906.

During her time in Scotland, Murray lived in Edinburgh with Dr Elsie Inglis, founder of the Scottish Women's Hospitals movement. Historians such as Hamer and Jennings have argued that Murray had her "first serious lesbian relationship" with Elsie Inglis.

== Career ==
=== Physician ===
In 1905 Murray was a medical officer at the Belgrave Hospital for Children in London and then an anaesthetist at the Chelsea Hospital for Women. In 1905 The Lancet published an article that she authored on the use of anaesthetic in children, titled Ethyl chloride as an anaesthetic for children.

=== Suffragette ===
Murray's hand in women's suffrage first started when she became a participant and activist of Millicent Fawcett's National Union of Women's Suffrage Societies. She then continued her work in women's suffrage as a supporter of Women's Social and Political Union. She also became a consistent participant in the militant movement, offering her services as a practitioner including at the Pembroke Gardens nursing home for suffragettes recovering from force-feeding, run by Nurses Catherine Pine and Gertrude Townend.

She took a leadership role and showed her value as an activist by speaking at public gatherings, becoming a member in the 1911 census protest, and using her medical knowledge and skill to treat her fellow suffragettes who experienced injuries through their work as activists. She looked after Emmeline Pankhurst and other hunger-strikers after their release from prison and campaigned with other doctors against the forcible feeding of prisoners.

=== Women's Hospital for Children ===
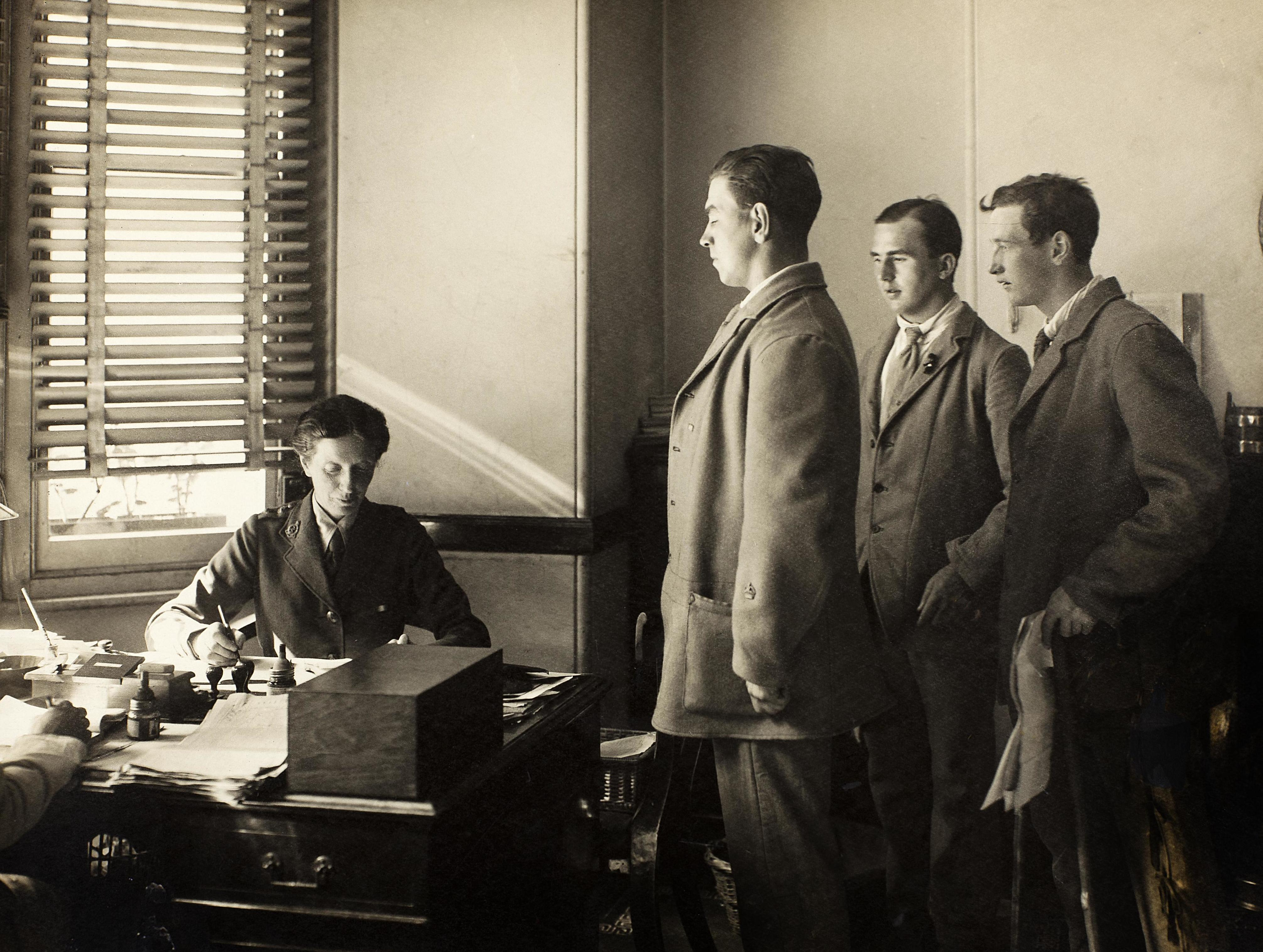
Dr Flora Murray discharges patients, Endell Street c. 1915

In 1912 she founded the Women's Hospital for Children at 688 Harrow Road with Louisa Garrett Anderson. It provided health care for working-class children of the area, and gave women doctors their only opportunity to gain clinical experience in paediatrics in London; the hospital's motto was Deeds not Words.

=== World War I ===
When the First World War broke out, Murray and her partner Dr Louisa Garrett Anderson founded the Women's Hospital Corps (WHC), and recruited women to staff it. Believing that the British War Office would reject their offer of help, and knowing that the French were in need of medical assistance, they offered their assistance to the French Red Cross. The French accepted their offer and provided them the space of a newly built hotel in Paris as their hospital. Flora Murray was appointed Médecin-en-Chef (chief physician) and Anderson became the chief surgeon.

Murray reported in her diary that visiting representatives of the British War Office were astonished to find a hospital run successfully by British women, and the hospital was soon treated as a British auxiliary hospital rather than a French one. In addition to the hospital in Paris, the Women's Hospital Corps also ran another military hospital in Wimereux.

In January 1915, casualties began to be evacuated to England for treatment. The War Office invited Murray and Anderson to return to London to run a large hospital, the Endell Street Military Hospital (ESMH), under the Royal Army Medical Corps. ESMH treated almost 50,000 soldiers between May 1915 and September 1919 when it closed.

=== After World War I ===
After the war ended, Murray returned to Harrow Road hospital which was renamed Roll of Honour Hospital, where she continued her work as a private practitioner. Her diary about her experiences of the War became a book titled Women as Army Surgeons: Being the History of the Women's Hospital Corps in Paris (1920). The book's dedication reads, "To Louisa Garrett Anderson / Bold, cautious, true and my loving companion."

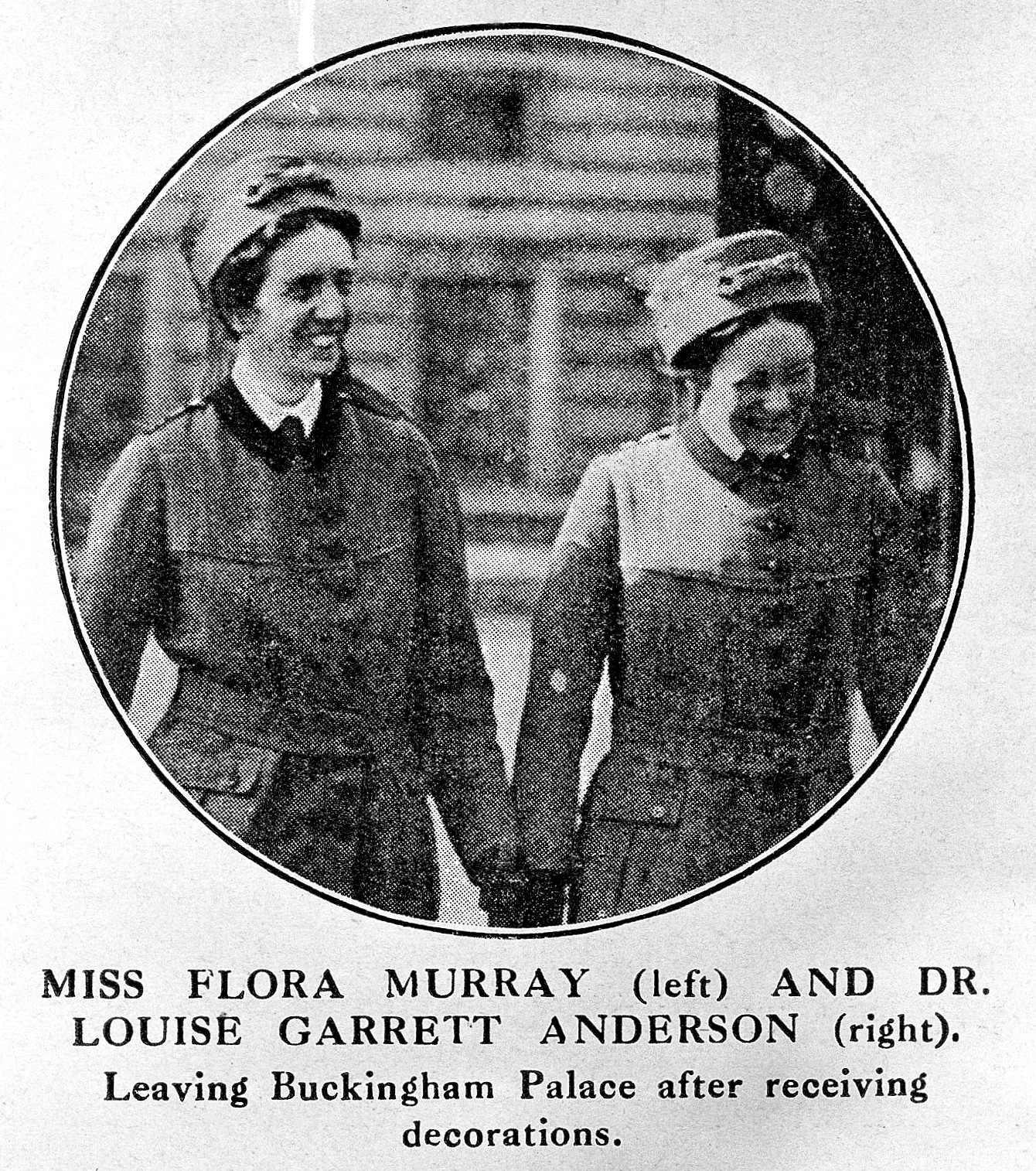
Miss Flora Murray (left) and Dr. Louise Garrett Anderson (right) leaving Buckingham Palace after receiving decorations

Lack of funding eventually led to the closure of the Roll of Honour Hospital, and also the retirement of both Murray and Anderson. They moved to a cottage in Paul End, in Penn, Buckinghamshire.

== Awards ==
Murray and Anderson were both appointed to the Order of the British Empire as Commanders (CBE) in August 1917, as part of the first group to receive the honour.

== Death ==
Murray suffered from cancer and died on 28 July 1923, aged 54. Her death occurred shortly after her surgery in a nursing home in Hampstead, London. Her lifelong partner was by her side. Murray left everything to Anderson in her will. Murray is buried at the Holy Trinity Church at Penn, Buckinghamshire, near the couple's former home. While Anderson was later cremated and her ashes scattered over the South Downs, a shared tombstone memorialises both women.

To the dear love of comrades and in memory of

Flora Murray

CBE, MD, BS Durham, DPH. Cambridge

Daughter of Com John Murray RN

Murraythwaite, Dumfriesshire

Born 8 May 1869

Died 26 July 1923

She commanded the military hospital Endall Street London with the rank of Lieutenant Colonel RAMC 1915 -1919

God gave her the strength to lead, to pity and to heal

And of her friend

Louisa Garrett Anderson

C.B.E., M.D., Chief Surgeon Women's Hospital Corps 1914–1919

Daughter of James George Skelton Anderson and Elizabeth Garrett Anderson of Aldeburgh, Suffolk.

Born 28 July 1873

Died 15 November 1943

WE HAVE BEEN GLORIOUSLY HAPPY

== Commemorations ==
In April 2022, it was announced that Murray would appear on the 'reverse side' of the new polymer £100 banknote to be issued by Bank of Scotland to highlight her work in medicine and in women's rights. The note will feature a portrait of Murray by Francis Dodd. The chief executive of the Royal Free London NHS Foundation Trust noted that "Almost a century since her death, Flora's story is a reminder of the huge debt of gratitude we owe to those early agitators who refused to accept the limitations imposed by a society that didn't believe women could or should be doctors, physicians and surgeons. “Then and now, we embrace the pioneers, the innovators, and the game-changers."

The banknote came third in the 2023 'world's most beautiful banknote' contest, with the image of Murray on the reverse side, in the foreground and her female stretcher-bearers at Endell Street Hospital in the background. She also appears uniquely in the banknote's front security hologram.

== See also ==
- History of feminism
- List of suffragists and suffragettes
