= Ernest Holloway Oldham =

British spy for the Soviet Union

- Born: 10 September 1894; Edmonton, London, England
- Died: 29 September 1933 (aged 39); Kensington, London, England
- Cause of death: Suicide
- Occupations: Soldier; Civil servant spy
- Spouse: Lucy Eliza Kayser
- Espionage activity
- Allegiance: Soviet Union
- Service years: 1927–1933
- Codename: ARNO

Ernest Holloway Oldham (September 10, 1894 – September 29, 1933) was, a British traitor, employed as a cipher clerk and cypher expert in the British Foreign Office. Along with his wife Lucy Oldham (codename MADAM) he spied for the Soviet Union between 1929 and his death in 1933, in return for money. His job gave him access to highly sensitive communications between Britain and its foreign embassies, and the material he passed to his handler Dmitri Bystrolyotov was highly regarded in Moscow. He had no apparent ideological interest in helping the Soviet Union (unlike the more famous Cambridge Five), but was driven by the large amounts of money paid to him to betray his country. By 1933, the pressures of his activities had led to his sacking from the Foreign Office, alcoholism, domestic violence and ultimately suicide.

Despite hints to there being a spy within the Foreign Office by Soviet defectors Grigory Besedovsky (in October 1929) and Georges Agabekov (in June 1930), Oldham's espionage was only partly suspected by his employers during the last months of Oldham's life, when MI5 began their investigation and surveillance. His activities were uncovered in 1940 when Oldham was identified by the Soviet defector Walter Krivitsky during his interrogations with MI5.

== Death ==
He was found dead on 29 September 1933 at 31 Pembroke Gardens, Kensington, London, with his head in a gas oven, and although ostensibly a suicide, it is just as likely that he was killed by the Soviets.

His wife died in 1945, suddenly, the day before she was due to be interviewed by MI5.

== See also ==
- John Herbert King

== Bibliography ==
- The National Archives (TNA): Public Record Office (PRO) KV2/808
- Andrew, Christopher; Vasili Mitrokhin (1999). The Sword and the Shield: The Mitrokhin Archive and the Secret History of the KGB. Basic Books. ISBN 0-465-00310-9
- West, Nigel (1998; 1999). The Crown Jewels: The British Secrets Exposed by the KGB Archives. London: HarperCollins.
- Barratt, Nick (2015). The Forgotten Spy. London: Blink. ISBN 978-1-910536-06-3.
- Stalin's Romeo Spy, Emil Draitser (2010)
