= Brian Goold-Verschoyle =

Irish communist

Brian Goold-Verschoyle: NKVD arrest photo May 1937

Brian Goold-Verschoyle (5 June 1912 – 5 January 1942) was an Irish member of the Communist Party of Great Britain and spy for the Soviet NKVD in Britain and in the Second Spanish Republic. After becoming disillusioned by the Red Terror against the anti-Stalinist Left during the Spanish Civil War, in 1937 Goold-Verschoyle was kidnapped, shipped to the Soviet Union, and following interrogation and trial in Moscow was sentenced to eight years hard labour for Trotskyist counter-revolutionary activity. A prisoner in the Gulag, he died in 1942. With Padraic Breslin and Sean McAteer, he was one of three Irish people documented as victims of Joseph Stalin's Great Purge.

== Early life ==
Brian Goold-Verschoyle was born in Dunkineely, County Donegal into a family from the Anglo-Irish gentry. His father, Hamilton Frederick Stuart Goold Verschoyle, a barrister, was a pacifist who supported Home Rule. "J. Goold-Verschoyle", presumably an uncle, was among the "distinguished Protestants" who shared a platform with Roger Casement and Jack White in a protest against "Carsonism" (Ulster unionism) in Ballymoney in October 1913.

After a childhood spent, during the Irish War of Independence and Civil War, at Portora Royal and Marlborough public schools, he moved in 1929 to England. Aged 19, he took an apprenticeship in the English Electric Works in Stafford.

In 1931 Goold-Verschoyle applied to join the Communist Party of Great Britain (CPGB) which prompted the MI5 to open a file on him. Eventually he became the party's leader in Stafford.

Among the early influences in Ireland that that may have set Goold-Verschoyle and his older brother Neil Goold (Hamilton Neil Goold-Verschoyle) on the path to Communism was a Donegal neighbour, Thomas Roderick Fforde. A retired Royal Navy commander and devotee of the Baháʼí Faith, Fforde briefly moved with his wife to Moscow to work in a factory. He had witnessed the brutality of the western imperial powers during the Boxer Rebellion and its aftermath in China, and had contact with Bolshevik sympathisers on his last naval posting to Murmansk during the Russian civil war. Although himself never a member of the Communist Party, he "preached Stalin's doctrine at Donegal fairs throughout the 1930s, standing on the running board of his car".

== Soviet spy ==
Goold-Verschoyle became a Soviet spy after visiting his older brother Neil and his Russian wife in Leningrad. The British domestic counterintelligence service, MI5, thought he was simply a "naïve supporter" of the Soviet Union. They remained unaware of the full truth until they learned years later from defecting Soviet GRU spymasters Gen. Walter Krivitsky and Henri Pieck, that Brian Good-Verschoyle had routinely couriered messages to the OGPU/NKVD and that he had travelled to the USSR in 1933, 1934 and 1935.

Brian Goold-Verschoyle also handled classified papers from moles working within the British Government, particularly from John Herbert King, a British Foreign Office clerk. He delivered them to former Roman Catholic priest and NKVD spymaster Theodore Maly. He also worked as a courier for Dmitri Bystrolyotov. Krivitsky, however, claimed that, as "an ardent and exceptionally naive supporter of the Soviet Union", Goold-Verschoyle, "alias 'Friend'", was unaware of the extent and nature of his espionage.

In 1936, Goold-Verschoyle, who had previously worked as a technician, returned under an assumed name to Moscow to undergo Wireless training. He was in love at the time with a German Jewish refugee named Lotte Moos and, to the dismay of his NKVD superiors, she accompanied him. Associated in the German Communist Party with the so-called Right Opposition, she was regarded as politically suspect. When Goold-Verschoyle completed his wireless training, he was assigned as a military advisor to the Second Spanish Republic, with express orders to break off all contact with Moos. (Moos succeeded in returning to Britain where she was arrested and interrogated as a suspected spy).

== Disaffection and arrest ==
In Spain, Goold-Verschoyle was alarmed by what he perceived as the subversion of the Second Spanish Republic by both Soviet intelligence agents and the local Communists they directed. He particularly objected to the Red Terror: the surveillance and persecution of both real and suspected members of the anti-Stalinist Left as alleged fifth columnists by the Soviet NKVD and the Servicio de Investigación Militar, the Republic's Communist-controlled political police. Concluding that Moscow had no interest in any socialist revolution it did not control completely, Goold-Verschoyle's letters to Lotte Moos and to his family in Ireland revealed a growing sympathy for the anti-Stalinist Workers' Party of Marxist Unification (POUM, with whose militia George Orwell served and which inspired his memoir Homage to Catalonia).

By April 1937, while working as a technician for the radio service of the Republican Army in Barcelona, Goold-Verschoyle had become sufficiently disillusioned that he asked to be released from active service. His commanding officer told him that he would have to wait until a replacement could be found. Several days later, Goold-Verschoyle was assigned to repair radio equipment aboard a Soviet freighter. Once aboard he was arrested and, with two members of the Communist Youth League, he was shipped as a prisoner to the Soviet port of Sevastopol. There the Irishman and the two Komsomol members were handed over to the NKVD and transferred to the Lubyanka Prison in Moscow.

== Death ==
Goold-Vershoyle was sentenced to eight years in the Gulag for counter-revolutionary Trotskyist activities. His interrogators had cited his continued correspondence with Moos. He died as a political prisoner in a Soviet gulag in Orenburg Oblast on 5 January 1942, one of only three Irish people who can be formally identified as victims of Stalin's Great Purge. Official Soviet sources had reported him killed in 1941 on a railway journey as a result of German bombing.

== Surviving family ==
Brian Goold-Vershoyle was survived by his brother, Neil Goold. Having lived in Moscow during the purge that claimed his brother, Goold returned to Ireland where, during the Second World War, he was interned with members of a now banned IRA. In the 1950s, he was active in the Connolly Association in London where, vocal in his defense of Stalin's legacy, he supported those in the CPGB opposed to the reformism of Khrushchev. In 1959 he re-established contact with his wife and son, and returned to Moscow, where he worked as a translator, notably of the plays of Bertolt Brecht, and died in 1987.

Brian Goold-Vershoyle was survived by three additional siblings, including Sheila Fitzgerald. Her notebooks and sketchbooks from their common childhood years in Donegal, was published in 1985 as A Donegal Summer.

== In memoir and fiction ==
- Brian Goold-Verschoyle is mentioned in GRU defector Walter Krivitsky's memoir I Was Stalin's Spy (1939) and in Gulag survivor Karlo Stajner's memoir 7000 Days in Siberia (1971).
- Danilo Kiš's collection of short stories A Tomb for Boris Davidovich (1976) contains a short story entitled The Sow That Eats Her Farrow with a protagonist "Gould Verskojls" that "in all likelihood" was inspired by the life of Brian Goold-Verschoyle.
- Informed by the recollections of his sister Sheila, Goold-Verschoyle's childhood is fictionalised in the 2005 historical novel, The Family on Paradise Pier by Dermot Bolger. (In 2018 Bolger published An Ark of Light a "stand-alone novel telling Sheila’s later story").
