= Ellen Pitfield =

Ellen Sarah Olivia Pitfield (c. 1857 – August 1912) was a British midwife, suffragette and member of the Women's Social and Political Union (WSPU).

== Life ==
Although commonly referred to in the press as a 'nurse' according to the nurse leader and suffragette sympathiser Ethel Gordon Fenwick "Ellen Pitfield [was] wrongly described as a 'nurse' but ... is a certified midwife." Pitfield was enrolled on the State Roll of Midwives in 1906, having qualified by examination.

Pitfield joined the suffragette movement in 1908 and became involved with militant action for women’s enfranchisement. This caused her to get arrested twice throughout that same year. Pitfield went on hunger strike whilst in prison. After being released from prison in 1909, she is reported to have said: "there are only two things that matter to me in the world: principle and liberty. For these I will fight as long as there is life in my veins. I am no longer an individual, I am an instrument." Pitfield was awarded a Hunger Strike Medal 'for Valour' by WSPU.

On 18 November 1910, Pitfield was present at 'Black Friday' and sustained injuries, which never fully healed. In 1911, Pitfield participated in the suffragette 1911 census boycott, whilst she was working and residing at the New Hospital for Women in Euston Road, London. Around this time, she discovered she had terminal cancer.

In March 1912, Pitfield wrote to WSPU leader Emmeline Pankhurst stating that "I am with you heart and soul in the great demonstration on March the 4th 1912" and declaring herself "A Soldier to the death". She travelled into central London on 3rd March, then entered the King Edward Street Post office and set fire to a basket of wood shavings soaked in paraffin. She also threw a brick, wrapped in copies of the Votes For Women newspaper, through a window of the building and immediately gave herself up to a nearby police constable to raise publicity for the cause. She was arrested, sentenced to six months of imprisonment and was carried from court to the prison hospital. Despite her illness, Pitfield refused to sign a statement against committing further militant action to secure an early release.

== Death ==
According to Sylvia Pankhurst, Pitfield was released in May, after the Men's Political Union for Women's Enfranchisement started a petition on her behalf. She was cared for at Pembroke Garden nursing home by nurses Catherine Pine and Gertrude Townend, and died three months later, in August 1912.

The British Journal of Nursing reported her imprisonment and later death, calling her "a faithful and devoted servant of suffering humanity".
