= Padraic Breslin =

Irish communist

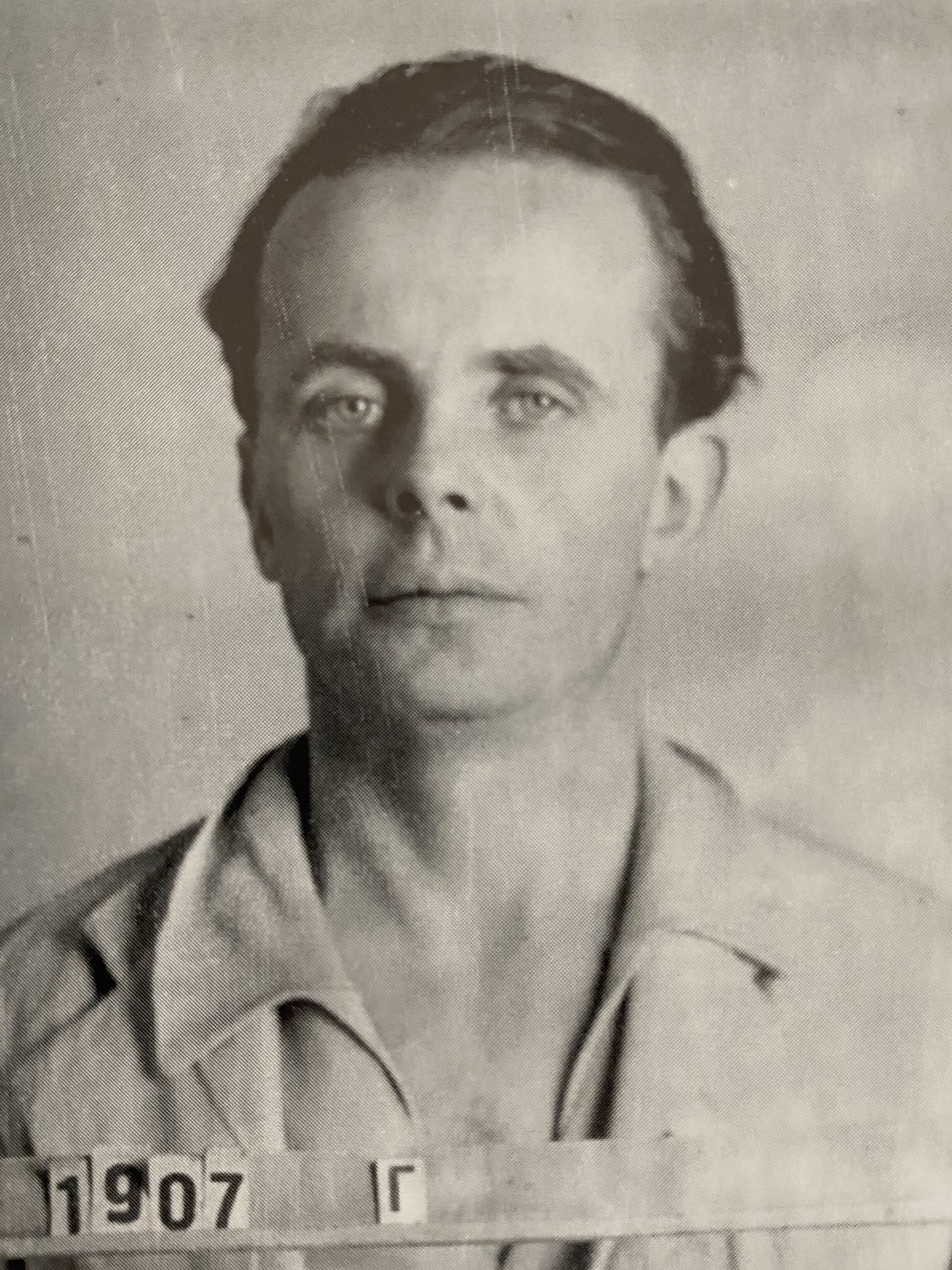
- Breslin in 1940
- Born: 14 June 1907; London, England
- Died: 21 June 1942 (aged 35); Volgolag corrective labour camp, Kazan, Russian SFSR, Soviet Union
- Occupation: Translator
- Known for: An Irish victim of the Great Purge
- Political party: Communist Party of Ireland (1922-1923); Irish Worker League (1923-1929)
- Spouses: Yekaterina "Katya" Kreizer (m. 1929; div. 1936); Maighréad Nic Mhaicín (m. 1936–1942)

Padraic Breslin (14 June 1907 – 21 June 1942) was an Irish communist and translator. After moving to the Soviet Union and renouncing his Irish citizenship, he became disenchanted with the Soviet Union, was convicted of "counter-revolutionary agitation", and died in a gulag.

== Early life ==
Padraic Breslin was born in London, England on 14 June 1907. His parents were both Irish, with his father from Glenties, County Donegal. The family returned to Ireland around 1920, to the North Strand in Dublin.

Breslin attended school there, and developed an interest in philosophy. He was inspired to join the Communist Party of Ireland in 1922 by his uncles, who had been involved in the American socialist movements. Breslin was the founder and leader of the Party's youth section, the Young Communist League of Ireland, writing articles and editing the youth section's column in the Workers’ Republic. When the Communist Party was dissolved in 1923, he joined the Irish Worker League (IWL) under the leadership of James Larkin.

== Life in Russia ==
He was one of eight young members sent to study at the International Lenin School, Moscow by the IWL in March 1928, with James Larkin Jnr and Sean Murray. In 1929 he met and married Yekaterina "Katya" Kreizer in Moscow. She was a Russian student of languages, who went on to work as a Japanese translator in the Soviet secret service (NKVD). They had a daughter and a son.

Around 1929 or 1930, Breslin was expelled from the International Lenin School for "ideological divergence" - while Breslin accepted the Marxist–Leninist ideology, he rejected Marxist materialism asserting belief in spirituality. By this time he was fluent in Russian and was employed by the school as a translator. He also worked on the English language newspaper, Moscow Daily News, as a journalist, as well as translating poetry. Breslin worked as a freelance translator, translating Russian songs, folk tales, and children's stories into English. He also wrote English lyrics to the song "Wide is my native land", later sung by Paul Robeson.

Becoming increasingly disillusioned with the Stalinist regime, Breslin voiced this to his friends, family and even casual acquaintances. Due to increasing pressure his wife was facing from superiors about her marriage to a foreign national who presented a possible security risk, Breslin became a Soviet citizen in 1936.

At the time, his first marriage was failing and ended in divorce. He met and married Maighréad Nic Mhaicín the same year. She was an Irish translator working in Moscow. She returned to Ireland to give birth to their daughter in June 1938, and Breslin attempted to follow them. She was refused re-entry into the Soviet Union, and he was denied a visa to leave despite his attempts to revoke his Soviet citizenship. He attempted to reclaim his Irish citizenship but was denied by Éamon de Valera's department of external affairs, citing the Citizenship Act of 1935.

His first wife was arrested and imprisoned in 1938, so Breslin shared the care of their children with her parents. He was then arrested in December 1940, accused of being a foreign agent. He was interrogated 60 times while in custody at Lubyanka. While no proof of espionage was found, he did admit anti-Soviet statements and beliefs under interrogation. By July 1941 he was declared a "socially dangerous element", and in September 1941 he was sentenced to eight years detention for "counter-revolutionary agitation".

He was imprisoned in Moscow's Butyrka prison for six months before being moved to Chistopol prison in Chistopol, Tatar ASSR. His health already failing, he was transferred to Volgolag corrective labour camp, near Kazan. He died on 21 June 1942, three days after his arrival. The official cause of death was given as heart failure caused by tuberculosis, though it is also possible that he was shot.

His first wife was released and reunited with their children in 1946, and resumed her work for the secret service. Irina Patrickovna Breslina (1934–2006), their daughter, worked as a botanist in St Petersburg, and their son Genrikh Patrikeyevich Kreizer (1937–2002) worked in Pushchino as a biological mathematician. Breslin's daughter with Nic Mhaicín, Mairéad Breslin Kelly (1938–2023), became a Dublin tour guide and volunteer for Women's Aid. The half-siblings were reunited in 1993 after a long search aided by The Irish Times Moscow correspondent, Seamus Martin.

On 26 February 1991, Breslin was posthumously rehabilitated of any crime by the Russian government. A documentary about Breslin and the reunification of his children, Amongst Wolves - Stalin's Irish Victim, was aired on RTÉ on 26 February 2001.

== See also ==
- Brian Goold-Verschoyle
- Sean McAteer
