= Theodore Maly =

Soviet spy of Hungarian origin

Theodore Maly (1894 – 20 September 1938) was a former Roman Catholic priest and Soviet intelligence officer during the 1920s and 1930s. He lived illegally in the countries where he worked for the NKVD and was one of the Soviet Union's most effective spymasters.

== Early life ==
He was born in Austria-Hungary in 1894 at Temesvár, Hungary, (now Timișoara, Romania) into a middle-class family. His father was an official of the Ministry of Finance. He entered a monastic order and studied theology and philosophy. At the outbreak of World War I he enlisted in the Austro-Hungarian Army. He attended the Military Academy and graduated in December 1915 with the rank of cornet. He was serving as a second lieutenant when he was captured by the Imperial Russian Army on the Eastern Front in 1916.

Maly later related his experiences to a friend:

During the war I was a chaplain, I had just been ordained as a priest. I was taken prisoner in the Carpathians. I saw all the horrors, young men with frozen limbs dying in the trenches. I was moved from one camp to another and starved along with other prisoners. We were all covered with vermin and many were dying of typhus. I lost my faith in God and when the revolution broke out I joined the Bolsheviks. I broke with my past completely. I was no longer a Hungarian, a priest, a Christian, even anyone's son. I became a Communist and have always remained one.

He voluntarily joined the Red Army in 1918 and participated in the Russian Civil War. Maly later became a member of the Russian Communist Party (b) in 1920.

== Illegal identities ==
The Soviets recognized that his passionate pride, intellect and charm were assets, and in 1932, he assumed the identity of Paul Hardt, a Central European intellectual, and travelled to England to control two British Foreign Office spies: John Herbert King and Ernest Holloway Oldham.

Another identity that he used in England was Mr Peters, an Austrian who had spent time in a monastery before becoming a captain in the Russian cavalry.

== Espionage activities ==
He was one of the controllers of the British Soviet NKVD spy ring known as the Cambridge Five: Kim Philby, Donald Maclean, Guy Burgess, John Cairncross and Anthony Blunt. Maly also controlled Arthur Wynn, founder of the Oxford spy ring, who had been recruited by Edith Tudor-Hart. In 1937, he left England on a false passport to escape arrest for his involvement in the Woolwich Arsenal spy case. It is assumed that he was tipped off before MI5 could arrange for his arrest.

While in England he was involved with fellow spy the Irishman Brian Goold-Verschoyle who delivered documents to Maly from the Foreign Office given to him by John Herbert King.

== Final days ==
In 1937 as the Stalinist terror took hold, Soviet intelligence personnel working abroad became principal targets of suspicion and were subject to recalls to the Soviet Union. In June, Maly received orders from Moscow to return. He knew his background in the atmosphere of the time made his position particularly dangerous: 'I know that as a former priest I haven't got a chance. But I've decided to go there so nobody can say: "That priest might have been a real spy after all'".

Maly returned to Moscow and worked at the Lubyanka. Any hope of returning to Europe was dashed with the defections of Ignace Reiss in July 1937 and Walter Krivitsky in October 1937. Alexander Orlov reports in the Secret History that Maly disappeared from his post in November 1937 but is contradicted in West's Crown Jewels, which cites a document that indicates that Maly was still at work on May 23, 1938. Although the exact date of Maly's arrest is unknown, it was probably after May 1938 and before Orlov's own defection to North America in July 1938.

Under interrogation, Maly confessed to being a German agent. On September 20, 1938, a tribunal sentenced Maly to death under Article 58 (6) of the Criminal Code, and he was executed at the Kommunarka shooting ground soon afterwards. The Soviet government rehabilitated Maly on April 14, 1956.

== Sources ==
- John Costello, Mask of Treachery, Warner Books,1990.
- Peter Wright, Spy Catcher, Viking Adult, 1987.
- Hede Massing, This Deception, Duell, Sloan, and Pearce, 1951.
- Alexander Orlov, The Secret History of Stalin's Crimes, Random House, 1953.
- Elisabeth Poretsky, Our Own People: A Memoir of Ignace Reiss and Friends, University of Michigan Press, 1969.
- Nigel West and Oleg Tsarev, The Crown Jewels: The British Secrets at the Heart of the KGB Archives, Yale University Press, 1998.
- William E. Duff, A Time for Spies: Theodore Stephanovich Mally and the Era of the Great Illegals, Vanderbilt University Press, 1999.
