= Lotte Moos =

Margarete Charlotte Moos (née Jacoby; 9 December 1909 – 3 January 2008) was a German-born politically active poet and playwright. She had been a young Communist in Germany, but was disillusioned by her experience of the Soviet Union. After the Second World War, she lived in England, frequently writing under the pseudonym Maria Lehmann

== Early life ==
Daughter of Samuel and Luise Jacoby, she was born in Berlin on 9 December 1909. She soon showed her talent as a writer, when, in 1919, her essay on eastern European refugees was published in the Berliner Tageblatt and she was thanked personally by the editor, Theodor Wolff. After a brief period at the school of the Berlin State Theatre she worked as assistant to a photographer and then in the Workers' Theatre. Here she met left-wing economist Siegfried Moos, "Siege", whom she married in 1932.

== Emigration and travels ==
After Hitler's rise to power in 1933 it was necessary for Lotte and Siege to flee Germany, and initially they settled in Paris, but soon moved to London. Lotte's ambition to study at LSE was frustrated by the fact that her German qualifications were not recognised. In 1936 the British government refused to renew her visa and she departed for the Soviet Union to join her Irish lover, Brian Goold-Verschoyle, and "to see what it was like".

Associated, in the view of Soviet authorities, with the so-called Right Opposition within the German Communist Party, she was regarded as politically suspect. When Goold-Verschoyle was assigned as a military advisor to the Second Spanish Republic, it was with express orders to break off all contact with Moos.

She succeeded in returning to Britain. In 1939, having been identified by the Soviet defector Walter Krivitsky as a possible spy, she was arrested and interrogated by MI5 in Holloway Prison. Then, with the outbreak of war, she was interned as an enemy alien on the Isle of Man.

Goold-Verschoyle, meanwhile, had been abducted by the NKVD from Spain. Sentenced in the Soviet Union to eight years for counter-revolutionary Trotskyist activities, he died a prisoner in the Gulag in January 1942,

== Oxford and Durham ==
On release from internment Lotte rejoined her husband in Oxford, where he was working at the Institute of Statistics under William Beveridge. Lotte worked as a nursemaid, translator, typist and teacher, and under the pseudonym Maria Lehmann, she also wrote a column for a London-based German-language Exilliteratur newspaper, Die Zeitung. Shortly after the war ended Siegfried was appointed as a lecturer at Durham University, and the family, now with a baby daughter, moved to Durham. There Lotte took part in amateur dramatics and also wrote plays, still using the "Maria Lehmann" name. In May 1964 her play Come Back With Diamonds, a comedy about a released political prisoner returning to Moscow, was performed at the Lyric Theatre, Hammersmith.

== London ==
In 1966, Siegfried became an adviser to the Board of Trade, and he and Lotte moved to Hackney in London. Both of them wrote poetry at this time, and Lotte had three collections published. Some of her work also appeared in the anthology The New British Poetry (1988). Siegfried died in 1988; Lotte died on 3 January 2008 in London. Their daughter Merilyn has written a biography of her father, which includes her search for the fate of her mother's Jewish parents in Germany under the Nazis.

== Published poetry ==
- Moos, Lotte (1981). Time to be Bold. London: Centerprise Trust.
- Moos, Lotte (1992). A Heart in Transit. London: Approach Poets.
- Moos, Lotte (1993). Collected Poems. Ware: Rockingham Press.
