= Language Freedom Movement =

Political movement in 1960s Ireland

The Language Freedom Movement (Irish: Gluaiseacht Saoirse Teanga) was a political organisation founded in 1966 that was opposed to some aspects of the state-attempted revival of the Irish language in the Republic of Ireland. The organisation had the backing of several notable Irish-speaking writers including Séamus Ó Grianna ("Máire") and John B. Keane.

== Concerns ==
=== Examinations ===
At the time the organisation was formed, if a student failed the Irish paper in their Leaving Certificate, they were deemed to have failed the whole exam. This requirement was abolished in 1973, although students are still obliged to study Irish as part of the Leaving Certificate programme and a pass is required for Irish students entering almost all Irish universities (but not for foreign students). In 1974, Irish was removed as a requirement for entry to the civil service.

=== Textbooks ===
Significant changes in the Leaving Certificate maths curriculum were reflected in two new textbooks produced by the Irish Christian Brothers. However, material for the new honours (higher-level) syllabus was offered only in a government-subsidised book in Irish while the pass (lower-level) material was published in English. The situation continued for several years until affordable alternative textbooks eventually became available.

== Mansion House meeting ==
The organisation held a meeting in the Mansion House in Dublin on 21 September 1966. It was advertised by a poster with a cartoon depicting the "Gaelic language policy" as a well-fed cow sitting atop the educational system. The meeting was chaired by broadcaster Gay Byrne. About 2000 people turned up, though most of them seemed opposed to the organisation. Opponents taunted the organisers by waving Union Jacks at them and singing "God Save the Queen". As John B. Keane got up to speak, one man seized an Irish Tricolour from the table used by the organisation, shouting that the flag should not be displayed at such a meeting. A fight involving ten men broke out and calm was only restored when the LFM agreed to four of their opponents speaking at the meeting.

The Gardaí were also present at the meeting. At the request of the organisers, Fine Gael TD Patrick Byrne had asked the Garda Commissioner to ensure law and order prevailed.

Irish language writer Máirtín Ó Cadhain and Mick Ryan (the IRA O/C of Dublin) were involved in the disruption of the meeting.

== See also ==
- Language revival
