= Khovanskoye Cemetery =

Cemetery in Moscow

- Хованское кладбище
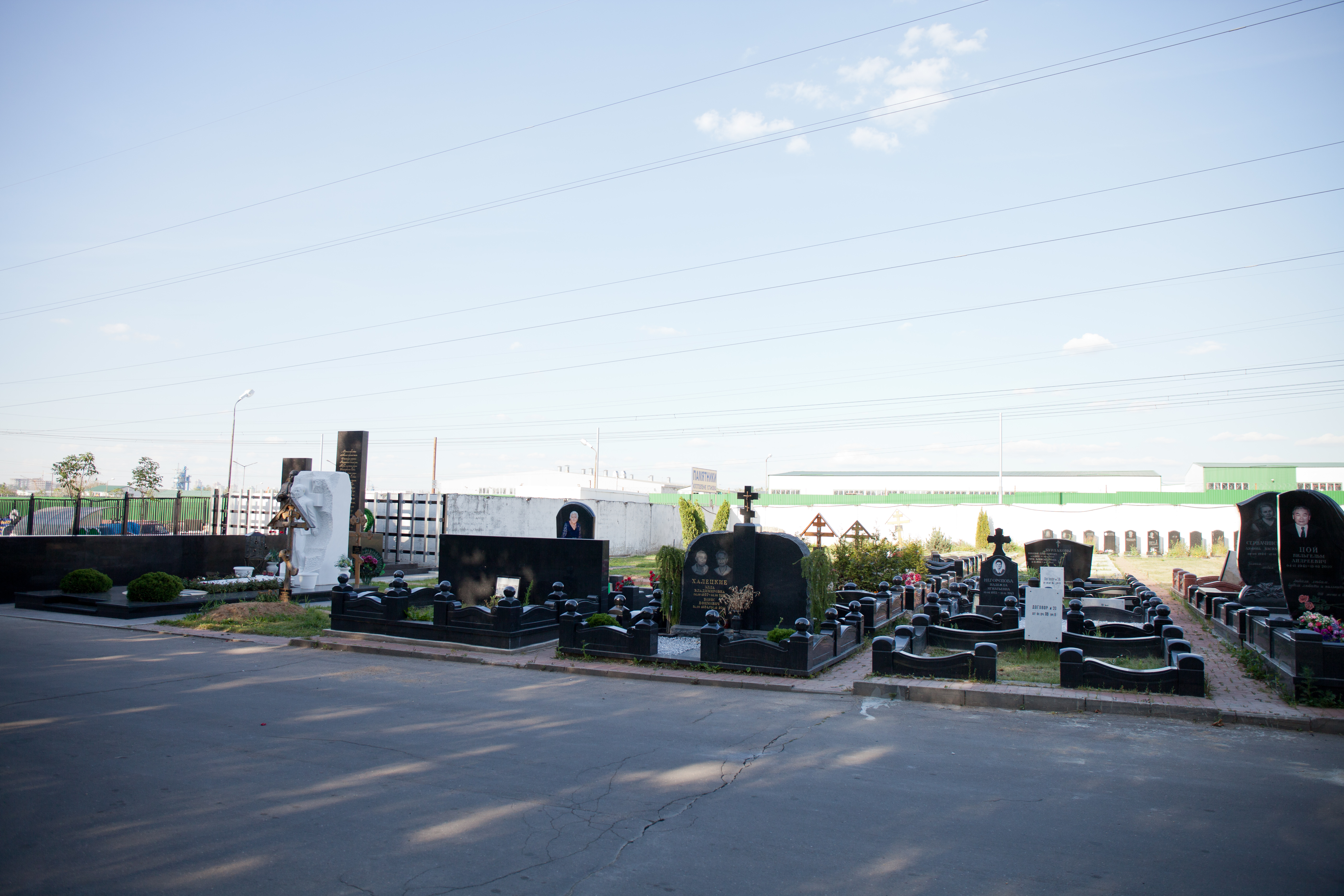
- Interactive map of Khovanskoye Cemetery

Details
- Established: 1972
- Location: Moscow
- Country: Russia
- Coordinates: 55°36′07″N 37°25′28″E
- Size: 1.97 km^{2} (0.76 sq mi)

Khovanskoye Cemetery (Russian: Хованское кладбище), also known as Nikolo-Khovanskoye Cemetery (Николо-Хованское кладбище), is a large and expanding cemetery servicing Moscow, Russia. It is located in the Leninsky District, Moscow Oblast, beyond the Moscow Ring Road, at the 21st kilometre mark of the Kiev Highway by the Mosrentgen and Nikolo-Khovanskoye settlements.

Khovanskoye Cemetery is the largest cemetery in Europe, covering more than 1,970,000 m^{2} (21,200,000 sq ft) It is divided into three smaller parts: Khovanskoye Central Cemetery, which was established in 1972 and covers 877,200 m^{2} (9,442,000 sq ft), Khovanskoye Northern Cemetery, founded in 1978 and covering 600,000 m^{2} (6,500,000 sq ft), and Khovanskoye Western Cemetery, which was established in 1992 and covers 501,200 m^{2} (5,395,000 sq ft). A Russian Orthodox chapel, which has been visited by Patriarch Alexius II, is located on the cemetery's grounds. A crematorium was built in 1988 for those wishing to use this service.

On 14 May 2016 three Tajik migrant workers died in the cemetery during a fight between hundreds of young mostly North Caucasus toughs and a group of mostly Tajik migrants who maintained the graves. According to Russian prosecutors this fight was the result of the efforts of former Moscow police officer Nikita Moshenko and Yury Chabuyev of the Moscow city-owned burial service Ritual to take control of the maintaining graves business (on the cemetery) worth 20 million rubles ($341,000) a month.

== Notable interred ==
- Vasily Aleksanyan
- Iskra Babich
- Dmitri Bystrolyotov
- Boris Delaunay
- Aslan Usoyan
- Alexei Khomich
- Aleksandr Ogorodnik
- Viktor Kosykh
- Ivan Safronov
- Ruslana Korshunova
