= Maighréad Nic Mhaicín =

Irish translator

Maighréad "Daisy" Nic Mhaicín
- Born: Margaret McMackin; 12 March 1899; Dunglow, County Donegal, Ireland
- Died: 1 January 1983 (aged 83); Grafton Street, Dublin

Maighréad "Daisy" Nic Mhaicín (12 March 1899 – 1 January 1983) was an Irish translator.

== Early life and education ==
Maighréad Nic Mhaicín was born in Dunglow, County Donegal on 12 March 1899. Her parents were John Macken, a member of the Royal Irish Constabulary, and Margaret McNamee. She was the third of 9 children, with four brothers and four sisters. She was known as Daisy. The family moved to Ballymoney, County Antrim, where Nic Mhaicín attended primary school. The family later moved to Belfast, where she attended a school with the Dominican nuns on the Falls Road, Belfast. Nic Mhaicín won a scholarship to attend Queen's University Belfast, where she studied for a BA in Celtic languages and French language, and went on to win a travelling scholarship to the Sorbonne in Paris. In Paris she studied for an MA with a speciality in phonetics and developed an interest in Russian. She returned to Ireland in the early 1920s, living on Grafton Street, Dublin.

== Career ==
Nic Mhaicín started working as a teacher, beginning in Wolverhampton and then with the Sacred Heart sisters on Leeson Street, Dublin. She did not enjoy teaching, opting to give private lessons instead while beginning to work as a translator. She became a member of a republican club, meeting regularly with other women with similar politics to hers including Catalina Bulfin, Róisín Ní Dhochartaigh, and Caitlín Nic Lochlainn at an apartment in 21 Dawson Street. Her older brother, Bernard, was interned in Frongoch for a time.

In 1932, she travelled to Russia for the first time to work as a translator. On her second visit in 1935, she married Padraic Breslin who was a USSR citizen born in London to Irish parents and who was also working in the translating bureau. She was his second wife. When expecting her first child in 1938, Nic Mhaicín wanted the baby to be born in Ireland, so she travelled to Belfast. Her daughter, Anna Maighréad, was born there on 8 June. The Soviet government would not permit her to return to the USSR, or give Breslin a visa to leave, which meant that she never saw her husband again. He died during World War II in the Volgolag Gulag camp, near Kazan June 1942.

Returning to Dublin, Nic Mhaicín worked giving private Russian lessons and correcting examination papers. She began working part-time as Trinity College Dublin's first Russian teacher. Despite her knowledge of both the language and literature, she never rose to head of department as she had no formal qualification in Russian. She translated a number of books from Russian, English and French into Irish for An Gúm. These included Anton Chekhov's An Silín-Ghort (1935) and Gearrscéalta Tchekov cuid a hAon (1939). She collaborated with Gearóid Ó Nualláin on Scéalta ón Rúisis (1955). She also translated from English Arthur Mason's Ridirí beaga na hoíche (1940), Patricia Lynch's Asal fhear na móna (1944), Eibhlín agus Séamus, and Rí na dtinncleoir (1945), and Norman McKinnel's Coinnleoirí an easbuig (1944). From French into Irish, she translated a collection of short stories Fíon Francach (1956), Rene Bazin's An Chaoin-Fhrainc, Émile Erckmann and Alexandre Chatrian's An tIúdach Pólach (1936). She also edited the collected Ós na ceithre hairdibh: cnuasach gearrscéal (1938). She served on the council of the Ireland-USSR Society and Cumann na Scríbhneoirí. She was a close friend of Séamus Ó Grianna who considered her one of the best students of Irish he had met in his life. They campaigned together against the standardisation of the Irish language, believing that it neglected the Donegal dialect of Ulster Irish. She retired from TCD in 1969.

She died on 1 January 1983 in her apartment on Grafton Street. In her obituary, Proinsias Mac Aonghusa described the apartment she rented for 50 years as "an unofficial center of Slavonic and Irish studies and cultures". In 1985, 200 Irish language books were donated to the University of Moscow by Cumann na bhFoilsitheoirí in her memory.
