= Séamus Ó Grianna =

Irish writer

- Born: 17 November 1889; Rann na Feirste, County Donegal, Ireland
- Died: 27 November 1969 (aged 80); Dublin, Ireland
- Education: St Patrick's College, Dublin
- Occupation: Writer
- Spouse: Constance (Connie) McDonnell
- Relatives: Seosamh Mac Grianna (Brother)
- Writing career
- Pen name: Máire
- Language: Irish
- Genre: Novel
- Subject: modern Irish prose
- Notable works: Caisleáin Óir and Cith is Dealán

Séamus Ó Grianna (Irish pronunciation: [ˈʃeːmˠəsˠ oː ˈɟɾʲiən̪ˠə]; 17 November 1889 – 27 November 1969; locally known also as Jimí Fheilimí) was an Irish writer, who used the pen name Máire.

== Biography ==
Born to Feidhlimidh Mac Grianna and Máire Eibhlín Néillín Ní Dhomhnaill into a family of poets and storytellers in Ranafast, County Donegal. He attended local primary school until the age of 14. He spent several years at home and as a seasonal worker in Scotland where he was introduced to the poetry of Robbie Burns and decided to become a teacher. He attended the Gaelic League's Coláiste Uladh Irish language summer college in Gortahork in 1910. He trained formally as a teacher in St. Patrick's College, Dublin, graduating in 1914, and was initially assigned as a teacher in Killskeery, Co. Tyrone. The following year in 1915, he replaced Peadar O'Donnell as the teacher on Inishfree off the coast of County Donegal. His last post as a teacher was in Lettercaugh near Loughanure. In 1920 he quit teaching to move to Dublin as a promoter of the First Dáil and the Irish language.

In Dublin he became involved with political matters and aligned himself with republicans and later anti-treaty republicans. He was interned alongside his brother, Seosamh Mac Grianna, and Peadar O'Donnell at Curragh Camp in County Kildare from 1922-1923 during the Irish Civil War. On his release, he became secretary for Cumann an Fháinne in January 1924 and later became an editor of Iris an Fháinne and of the Gaelic League's Fáinne an Lae (formerly An Claidheamh Soluis).

He worked subsequently as a translator for An Gúm (a part of the Department of Education), in the Irish Civil Service, and on Irish dictionaries in the Department of Education. He had acquired a good knowledge of French, having spent six months living in the south of France between 1926–1927, and he also published translations of short stories by Alphonse Daudet, Guy de Maupassant, and Anatole France. He married Connie Mac Donnell, a nurse from Abbeyleix, County Laois in 1931.

He expressed bitterness with Irish language politics, however, and in 1966 joined the "Language Freedom Movement" along with other Irish language writers and translators such as Maighréad Nic Mhaicín that were critical of the government's Irish language revival strategies and opposed dropping the policy of Irish being compulsory in schools. Ó Grianna was opposed to the standardisation of Irish and the introduction of roman type (Irish: Cló Rómhánach), refusing to allow any publications of his works that didn't use Gaelic type (Irish: Cló Gaelach). In his latter life he became disillusioned with the Irish revival movement.

Ó Grianna died on 27 November 1969 in Dublin, aged 80.

== Legacy ==
His literary output spanned more than fifty years and included novels, short stories, essays and two autobiographies. He also wrote Rann na Feirste (1942), an account of the customs, history and folklore of his native area. Despite resistance to standardisation and roman type during his lifetime, Ó Grianna's collective works are now regarded as a considerable influence on written and spoken Irish.

In 2001, Ó Grianna's novel Caisleáin Óir was adapted into a musical. The adaptation was written by Leslie Long, Kathleen Ruddy and Phil Dalton, and the musical premiered at An Grianán Theatre, Letterkenny, County Donegal.

== List of works ==
- Bean Ruadh de Dhálach. 1966 (novel).
- Caisleáin Óir. Mercier Press, Dublin 1924 (novel).
- Castar na Daoine ar a Chéile. Scríbhinní Mháire 1. Edited by Nollaig Mac Congáil. Coiscéim, Dublin 2002 (novel and journalism)
- Cith is Dealán. Mercier Press, Dublin and Cork 1994 (short stories).
- Cora Cinniúna 1-2 (two volumes of short stories) An Gúm, Dublin 1993
- Cúl le Muir agus scéalta eile. Oifig an tSoláthair, Dublin 1961 (short stories)
- Mo Dhá Róisín. 1921 (novel).
- Na Blianta Corracha. Scríbhinní Mháire 2. Edited by Nollaig Mac Congáil. Coiscéim, Dublin 2003 (journalism)
- Nuair a Bhí Mé Óg. Mercier Press, Dublin and Cork 1942 (autobiography).
- An Sean-Teach. Oifig an tSoláthair, Dublin 1968 (novel)
- Saoghal Corrach, 1945 (autobiography).
- Suipín an Iolair, Clóchuallucht Chathail, Tta., Baile Átha Cliath 1962 (novel)
- Tairngreacht Mhiseoige. An Gúm, Dublin 1995 (novel)
- Báire na Fola. Edited by Nollaig Mac Congáil. Arlen House, Dublin 2022 (novel)

== Bibliography ==
- Mac Congáil, Nollaig (1990). Máire. Baile Átha Cliath: Coiscéim.
