= Mo Bhealach Féin =

Mo Bhealach Féin (released 1940) is an autobiographical novel by Irish writer Seosamh Mac Grianna. Written in the mid-1930s and prompted by the success of the Blasket autobiographies and O'Flaherty's Two Years, it gives an artistic Gaeltacht writer's personal reaction to an anglicised, urbanised post-revolution Ireland and the world in general and represents the writer's work at its best.
