= Seosamh Mac Grianna =

Irish writer (1900 or 1901–1990)

- Born: 1900 or 1901 (Note: See § Date of birth.); Rann na Feirste, County Donegal, Ireland
- Died: 11 June 1990 (aged 89); Letterkenny, County Donegal, Ireland
- Occupation: Writer
- Spouse: Peigí Green (died 1959)
- Children: 1
- Relatives: Séamus Ó Grianna (brother)
- Writing career
- Language: Irish
- Notable work: Mo Bhealach Féin (1940)

Seosamh Mac Grianna (1900 or 1901 – 11 June 1990) was an Irish writer. He was born into a family of poets and storytellers, which included his brothers Séamus Ó Grianna and Seán Bán Mac Grianna, in Rann na Feirste (Ranafast), a village in The Rosses in the west of County Donegal, at a time of linguistic and cultural change. Mac Grianna is the most high-profile modern writer in Ulster Irish.

== Date of birth ==
It is unclear when Mac Grianna was born. He was said to have been born in August 1900, and 1900 is the year that appears on his commemorative plaque in Dublin. However, his birth certificate states that he was born on 15 January 1901.

== Education and early activities ==
Seosamh was born to Feidhlimidh Mac Grianna and Máire Eibhlín Néillín Ní Dhomhnaill, the daughter of the famous storyteller Johnny Shéamaisín Ó Domhnaill. His siblings included the writer and translator Domhnall Ó Grianna, the poet and songwriter Seán Bán Mac Grianna, and the writer and translator Séamus Ó Grianna and many other members of his extended family played prominent roles in the cultural life of the Donegal Gaeltacht and in the State publishing house An Gúm. He was educated at St Eunan's College, Letterkenny, and St Columb's College in Derry. He trained as a teacher in St Patrick's College, Dublin, from which he graduated in 1921. He became involved in the Irish War of Independence, and, during the Irish Civil War, he was interned as an Anti-Treaty IRA member by the Irish Army for fifteen months along with his brother Hiúdaí. According to the Donegal-born historian Pádraig Ó Baoighill, the brothers participated in a hunger strike during their term in the internment camp at the Curragh, in County Kildare. He began a teaching career upon his release, but found it difficult to find a permanent position, partly because of his reputation as a former Anti-Treaty IRA member and internee.

== Creative career ==
Mac Grianna started writing in the early 1920s, and his creative period lasted some fifteen years. He wrote essays, short stories, travel and historical works, a famous autobiography, Mo Bhealach Féin, and a novel, as well as translating many books. He was imbued with a strong, oral traditional culture from his childhood, and this permeated his writings, particularly in the early years.

== Latter career and death ==
Towards the end of his career, Mac Grianna grew increasingly analytical and critical as he examined the changing face of the Gaeltachtaí and the emergence of an Anglicised Irish Free State with no loyalty to, or sympathy with, a heroic and cultured past. From the 1930s on he struggled with creative exhaustion and disillusionment, exacerbated by both poverty and mental health problems. The last line in his unfinished novel 'Dá mbíodh ruball ar an éan' summarized his creative struggle; ‘Thráigh an tobar ins an tsamhradh 1935. Ní scríobhfaidh mé níos mó. Rinne mé mo dhícheall agus is cuma liom.’ ('The well ran dry in the summer of 1935. I will not write anymore. I did my best and it's all the same to me now'). He also came into conflict with Catholic Social Teaching, as he and his long-term partner Peigí Green are generally believed to have been unmarried. This may have been because Green had previously been married and was therefore unable to get remarried within the Catholic Church. The couple had one son, Fionn, who was taken into care by the Irish Christian Brothers as the couple were reportedly unable to care for him.

He was probably the greatest Gaeltacht writer of his time, whose work had developed considerably before he was stricken by a severe depressive psychosis in 1935. In 1959 his long-term partner committed suicide and his son, Fionn, drowned in Dublin Bay. That same year he admitted himself to St Conal's Psychiatric Hospital in Letterkenny, where he was diagnosed with schizophrenia. He stayed there for most of the next 31 years and died in 1990.

== Legacy ==
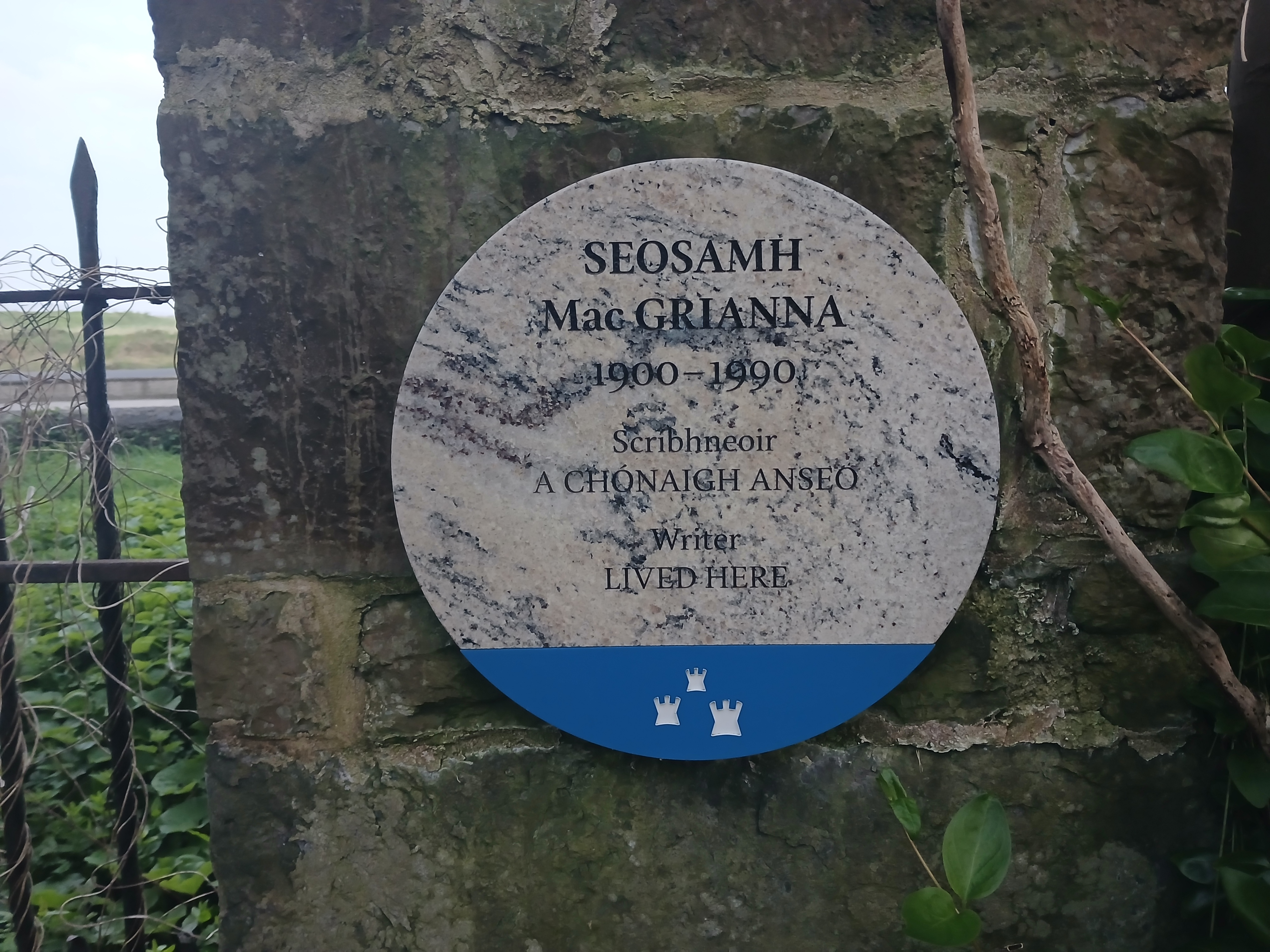

In the 1950s, Máirtín Ó Cadhain described Mac Grianna as one of a handful of 'true writers' to have emerged from the Irish language tradition in the early 20th century, alongside himself, Padráic Ó Conaire and Pádraig Mac Piarais. His reputation has continued to grow, and many of his short stories and other writings were collected and republished in the 1970s. Several biographies and books of criticism have been published on Mac Grianna in both Irish and English, including by Proinsias Mac an Bheatha in 1970 and by Pól Ó Muirí in 1999.

In 2016, BBC Two Northern Ireland broadcast a documentary entitled Ar Mo Bhealach Féin in which Seán Mac Labhraí retraced the steps of Seosamh Mac Grianna and his 300-mile journey through Wales. In 2020, Mac Grianna's auto-biographical book 'Mo Bhealach Féin' was published in an English translation for the first time by Lilliput Press as 'This Road of Mine'.

In 2023, a plaque was unveiled by Dublin City Council at the site of his former home in Saint Anne's Park, Raheny.

== Bibliography ==
=== Novel ===
- Mo Bhealach Féin (1940)
- Dá mBíodh Ruball ar an Éan (2005)
- An Druma Mór (1972)

=== Biography ===
- Eoghan Ruadh Ó Néill (1931)

=== Short stories ===
- An Grádh agus an Ghruaim (1929)
- Dochartach Duibhlionna agus scéalta eile, bailiúchán (1936)

=== Essays ===
- Fáinne an Lae (1925)
- Filí Gan Iomrá (1926)
- Pádraic Ó Conaire agus Aistí Eile (1936)
- An Bhreatain Bheag (1937)
- Na Lochlannaigh (1938)
- Filí agus Felons (1987)

=== Translations ===
- Teacht Fríd an tSeagal (1932) translation of Comin' Thro' the Rye by Ellen Buckingham Mathews
- An Mairnéalach Dubh (1933) translation of The Nigger of the 'Narcissus' by Joseph Conrad
- Ben Hur (1933) translation of Ben-Hur: A Tale of the Christ by Lew Wallace
- An Páistín Fionn (1934) translation of The Whiteheaded Boy by Lennox Robinson
- Séideán Bruithne (1935) translation of Typhoon by Joseph Conrad
- Teach an Chrochadóra (1935) translation of Hangman’s House by Brian Oswald Donn-Byrne
- Díthchéille Almayer (1936) translation of Almayer’s Folly by Joseph Conrad
- Ivanhoe (1937) translation of Ivanhoe by Walter Scott
- Báthadh an Ghrosvenor (1955) translation of The Wreck of the Grosvenor by William Clark Russell
- Imtheachtaí Fear Dheireadh Teaghlaigh (1936) translation of Adventures of a Younger Son by Edward John Trelawny
- Muintir an Oileáin (1952) translation of Islanders by Peadar O'Donnell
- Eadarbhaile (1953) translation of Adrigoole by Peadar O'Donnell
