= Paul Wohl =

American journalist (1901–1985)

Paul Wohl (1901 – April 2, 1985) was a German-born journalist and political commentator.

== Biography ==
Paul Wohl was born in 1901 in Berlin. He died age 84 in April 1985 at St. Barnabas Hospital in the Bronx, after living three years at the Pelham Parkway Nursing Home.

== Journalism career ==
In 1938, Wohl came to the United States as a correspondent for Czechoslovak newspapers. He worked for the Christian Science Monitor from 1941 until 1979, when he retired. He also contributed to the New York Herald Tribune, The Nation, Barron's, and Commonweal.

In the mid-1920s, Wohl met Soviet spy Walter Krivitsky. Months after Krivitsky defected, Wohl left Europe for the States and became Krivitsky's literary agent. Wohl (and Isaac Don Levine as ghostwriter) helped the non-English-speaking Krivitsky write his memoir In Stalin's Secret Service (1939). At the time of its publication, they argued about fees owed to Wohl and severed their connection.

== See also ==
- Walter Krivitsky
- Isaac Don Levine
- Louis Waldman
