= Gertrude Townend =

British nurse and suffragette

Gertude Townend
- Education: Trained at St Bartholomew's Hospital, London
- Occupations: nurse and suffragette
- Organization: private care home nursing recovering suffragettes
- Known for: suffragette activism and hunger strike

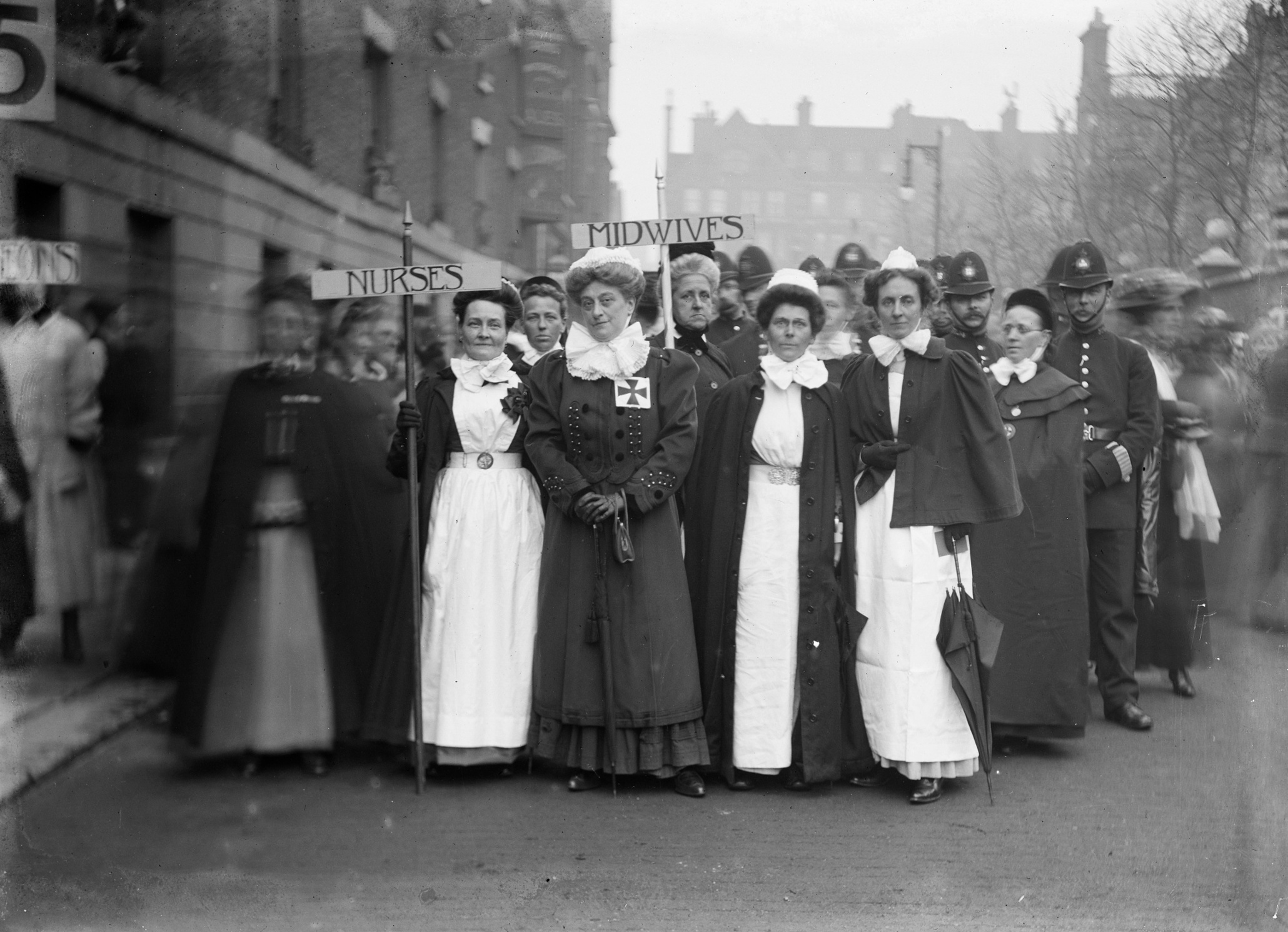
Nurses and midwives march to Royal Albert Hall, 1909

Gertrude Catherine Townend was a British nurse and suffragette. She provided, with Nurse Catherine Pine, a care home for suffragettes recovering from imprisonment and force-feeding, and participated in suffragette gatherings.

== Nursing career ==
Gertrude Townend trained at St Bartholomew's Hospital in London, qualified in 1901 and became a sister at (Great) Ormond Street Hospital. By 1908, she was running a private nursing home with Nurse Catherine Pine in 3 Pembridge Gardens, Notting Hill, London.

== Suffragette activism ==
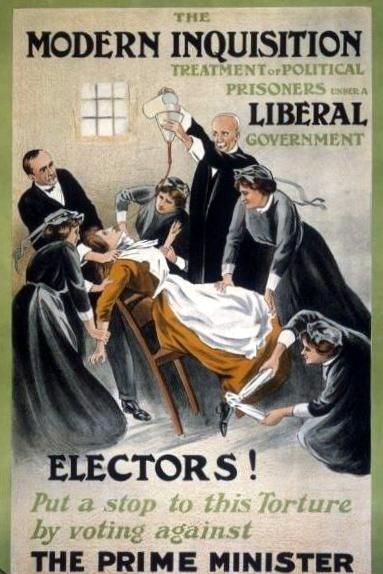
Anti force feeding poster

Townend and Pine's nursing home was watched by police looking for escaped suffragettes, due to return to prison to finish their sentences. At the home, medical assistance was provided by Dr. Flora Murray, a fellow suffragette. The service provided by Townend was particularly used by women released from prison temporarily, to recover after becoming seriously ill during force-feeding under the "Cat and Mouse Act".

Townend helped Pine look after Emmeline Pankhurst's son Harry, prior to an examination under anaesthesia, at Pembridge Gardens from the farm he was staying on when he took an acute inflammation of the bladder. She trusted Townend and Pine to care for him while she travelled.

For the event on 18 June 1910, Townend was named in The British Journal of Nursing as the contact with Nurse Catherine Pine, for nurses in uniform wishing to parade with the women's march from Embankment to the Royal Albert Hall which ultimately attracted 10,000, including international. occupational and regional groups, walking in their relevant contingents.

In 1912, after a campaign by The British Journal of Nursing and the Men's League for Women's Suffrage, Townend cared for Ellen Pitfield who had been released from prison after an arson incident, at the nursing home on Pembridge Gardens although she died a few weeks later.

These nurses also helped Christabel Pankhurst stay overnight and then escape to France after the raid on Clements Inn, by letting her dress in Townend's nurse's uniform to avoid suspicion as she left.

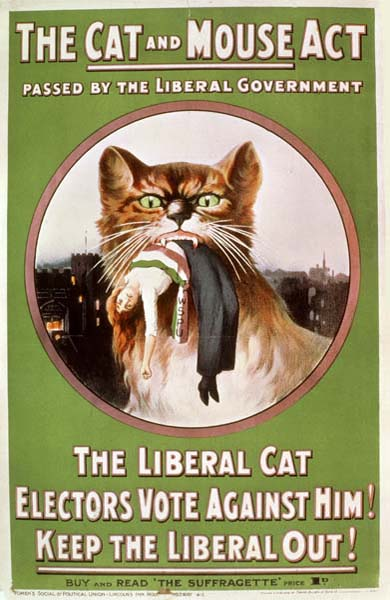
Cat and Mouse Act poster

In October 1913, Townend was herself injured when there was a crush as detectives raided the Bow Baths Hall meeting, where Sylvia Pankhurst was speaking, under the above Act. Sylvia escaped to be arrested the next day.
