= Patricia Lynch =

Irish children's writer and journalist

Patricia Lynch (4 June 1894– 1 September 1972) was an Irish children's writer and a journalist. She was the author of some 48 novels and 200 short stories. She is best known for blending Irish rural life and fantasy fiction as in The Turf-Cutter's Donkey which was illustrated by Jack B. Yeats.

== Bibliography ==
Patricia Nora Lynch was born in Cork, Ireland on 4 June 1894 to Thomas and Nora Lynch (née Lynch), both of Cork. Her parents were first cousins. She had one brother, Henry Patrick and two sisters, Laura and Winifred. Much of the detail of Lynch's early life comes from her autobiographical A Storyteller's Childhood, and some doubts about its reliability have been raised. Her father was described as a "stockbroker" on Lynch's wedding certificate, but he is known to have pursued a number of careers, including journalism.

As a result of her father's death she received her education at schools in Ireland, England, Scotland and Belgium. She became a journalist and in 1916 was sent to Dublin by Sylvia Pankhurst to report on the Easter Rising for The Workers' Dreadnought. Although a committed Irish nationalist, she retained a London accent to the end of her life. She made and remained friends with several notable nationalists including Maud Gonne and Constance Markievicz. She was an activist in achieving votes for women. In 1948 Irish Playwright Teresa Deevy published an essay on Lynch entitled "Patricia Lynch: A Study".

Lynch married socialist historian R. M. Fox in Dublin on 31 October 1922 and they settled in Glasnevin. She died in Monkstown, Dublin on 1 September 1972 and is buried in Glasnevin Cemetery with her husband. Her semi-autobiographical A Story-Teller's Childhood was published in 1947.

== Journalism ==
Patricia Lynch worked as a freelance journalist in her late teens and early twenties. Her article "Scenes from the rebellion", written for a suffragette paper, The Workers' Dreadnought gave an eye-witness account of the events of the 1916 Easter Rising in Dublin. She was politically active, and spoke at suffrage rallies. She was friends with Maud Gonne, Constance Markievicz, Hanna Sheehy-Skeffington, and with the Fabian writer, Edith Nesbit.

== Writing ==
Patricia Lynch is best known for The Turf-Cutter's Donkey, first published in 1934. It was originally serialised in The Irish Press from 1931. It was translated into Irish by Maighréad Nic Mhaicín as Asal fhear na móna in 1944.

She is co-author of Lisheen at the Valley Farm and other stories along with Teresa Deevy and Helen Staunton where she wrote Strange People a story about a little girl called Meg and her friends.

Marcus Crouch in The Nesbit Tradition describes Lynch's work as "the richest and most heart-warming of family stories." He particularly mentions the fantasy The Grey Goose of Kilnevin and the "homely adventure" Fiddler's Quest.

Her works had many different illustrators, including the artists John Butler Yeats (The Turf-Cutter's Donkey), Sean Keating (The Grey Goose of Kilnevin), and Eileen Coghlan (Strangers at the Fair).

== Works ==
- The Green Dragon (1925)
- Cobbler's Apprentice (1930)
- The Turf-cutter's Donkey: An Irish Story of Mystery and Adventure (1934)
  - The Donkey Goes Visiting: The Story of an Island Holiday (1935)
  - The Turf-Cutter's Donkey Kicks Up His Heels (1939)
  - Long Ears (1943)
- King of the Tinkers (1938)
- The Grey Goose of Kilnevin (1939)
- Fiddler's Quest (1941)
- Strangers at the Fair (1945)
- Lisheen at the Valley Farm & Other Stories (1945)
- Brogeen of the Stepping Stones (1947)
  - Brogeen Follows the Magic Tune (1952)
  - Brogeen and the Green Shoes (1953)
  - Brogeen and the Bronze Lizard (1954)
  - Brogeen and the Princess of Sheen (1955)
  - Brogeen and the Lost Castle (1956)
  - Brogeen and the Black Enchanter (1958)
  - The Stone House at Kilgobbin: a Brogeen Story (1959)
  - Brogeen and the Little Wind (1962)
  - Brogeen and the Red Fez (1963)
  - The Lost Fisherman of Carrigmor: a Brogeen Story (1960)
  - Guests at the Beech Tree: a Brogeen story (1964)
- The Mad O'Haras (1948)
- The Dark Sailor of Youghal (1951)
- The Boy at the Swinging Lantern (1952)
- Grania of Castle O'Hara (1952)
- Delia Daly of Galloping Green (1953)
- Orla of Burren: The Story of a Sea-Captain's Daughter (1954)
- Tinker Boy (1955)
- The Bookshop on the Quay (1956) (alt. title Shane Comes to Dublin)
- Cobbler's Luck (1957)
- Fiona Leaps the Bonfire (1957)
- The Old Black Sea Chest: A Story of Bantry Bay (1958)
- Jinny the Changeling (1959)
- The Runaways (1959)
- Sally from Cork (1960)
- The Longest Way Round (1961)
- Ryan's Fort (1961)
- The Golden Caddy (1962)
- The House at Lough Neagh (1963)
- Holiday at Rosquin (1964)
- Mona of the Isle (1965)
- Back of Beyond (1966)
- The Kerry Caravan (1967)

Collections

- Knights of God: Stories of the Irish Saints (1945)
- Strangers at the Fair and Other Stories (1945)
- Tales of Irish Enchantment (1952)
- The Twisted Key and Other Stories (1964)

Autobiography

- A Storyteller's Childhood (1947)

== Adaptations ==
Frank Kelly and puppeteer Eugene Lambert adapted the book Brógeen Follows The Magic Tune into a nine part puppet series for RTÉ.
