= Pembroke Gardens =

Street in Kensington, London

Coordinates: 51.49591°N 0.20178°W

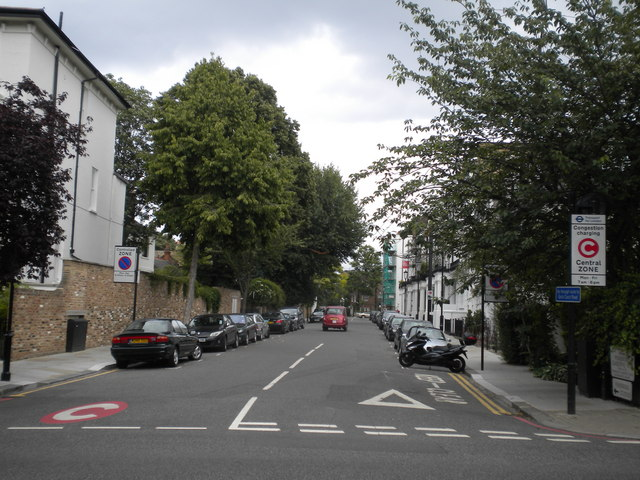
Pembroke Gardens in 2010

Pembroke Gardens is a street in the Royal Borough of Kensington and Chelsea, London.

It is in two parts meeting at a right angle, and runs from a junction with Pembroke Road and Cromwell Crescent to another junction with Warwick Gardens. It also intersects with the south-west corner of Edwardes Square.

It was developed in the 1850s and 1860s, largely by Richard Albion Holliday of Newland Street.

On 29 September 1933, Ernest Holloway Oldham was found dead at his home, 31 Pembroke Gardens with his head in a gas oven. Oldham was a cipher clerk in the Foreign Office, but from 1929 until his death in 1933 was a Soviet spy for money, rather than some ideological motivation. Although ostensibly a suicide, it is just as likely that he was killed by the Soviets. His wife Lucy King was found dead in The Thames in 1950. It is possible that they were both killed by the Soviets or MI5.
