= Great Illegals =

Group of Soviet espionage agents

The Great Illegals were a group of Soviet Comintern espionage agents whom MI5 counterintelligence agent Peter Wright grouped together due to their masterful espionage activities against the west. Often, they were generally foreigners but held Russian citizenship and were ideologically driven. They were trotskyist communists who believed in international communism and the comintern. Wright considered them the best recruiters and controllers (espionage directors) that Soviet intelligence ever produced. They knew each other, and together they recruited and built a number of high-grade espionage networks in hostile foreign countries, across the world. Examples of these were: Arnold Deutsch, who recruited Kim Philby of the Cambridge Five in Britain; the Red Three (Rote Drei) in Switzerland, run by Alexander Radó; Leopold Trepper's network, the Red Orchestra (Rote Kapelle), in German-occupied Europe; and Richard Sorge's espionage network in China and Japan.
