= Dmitri Bystrolyotov =

Soviet spy (1901–1975)

Dmitri Aleksandrovich Bystrolyotov (Russian: Дмитрий Александрович Быстролётов; January 3, 1901 – May 3, 1975) was a Soviet Russian intelligence officer, a polyglot, a writer and a Gulag prisoner. As a Soviet undercover operative, Bystrolyotov worked in Western Europe between World War I and II, recruiting and controlling several agents in Great Britain, France, Germany, and Italy. His greatest achievement was breaking into the British Foreign Office files years before Kim Philby, as well as procuring diplomatic ciphers of many of European countries. In the 1930s, he fell victim of Joseph Stalin's purges. Arrested by the NKVD on drummed up charges, he was tortured severely. While serving his term, he spent over 16 years in various Gulag camps. There, at great risk to himself, he wrote and smuggled his memoirs to the outside world. According to an account by Radio Free Europe, they were "an indictment of the Communist Party of the Soviet Union's crimes against humanity".

== Early life and career ==
He was born to out-of-wedlock parents in the village of Aibory, in the Crimea, to Klavdiya Bystrolyotov, a provincial clergyman's daughter. In his memoirs, Bystrolyotov identifies his father as a vice-governor of Saint Petersburg and governor of Vitebsk, Count Alexander Nikolaevich Tolstoy, a brother of Aleksei Tolstoi.

Raised in an impoverished foster family of aristocrats in Saint Petersburg, with the outbreak of the Russian Civil War, Bystrolyotov was first drafted into the White Army but after its defeat, he was recruited as a "sleeper" by the Cheka, the Soviet secret police.

He was sent to the West with the flow of Russian refugees and he was activated after he settled in Prague. Capitalizing on his knowledge of several European languages and his aristocratic upbringing, he operated amid the upper layers of European societies and became one of the "Great Illegals", a squad of outstanding Soviet spies who worked undercover in Western countries between World War I and II.

With the growing threat of fascism and nazism, Bystrolyotov successfully hunted for Italian and German military secrets. He also stole British secrets for the Soviets years before Kim Philby and made Stalin privy to the contents of French, Italian, Swiss, and American diplomatic cables.

The modus operandi of Bystrolyotov involved seduction and recruitment of women as Soviet agents, among them a French diplomat, a German countess, and a Gestapo officer. As a result, he provided Stalin with minutes of Hitler's meetings with Western diplomats, as well as German, Italian, Spanish, British and French diplomatic communications.

Bystrolyotov also procured Hitler's four-year plan for the rearmament of Germany for the Soviets and he helped identify the Nazis' fifth column in pre-World War II France. In 1935, he smuggled samples of the latest models of German and Italian weaponry across European borders. During a mission to probe the feasibility of the French government's secret promise to Stalin in the event of German aggression in Europe, which was to bring an army of mercenaries from Africa, he crossed the Sahara Desert twice and he crossed the jungles of the Belgian Congo.

== Arrest and imprisonment ==
In 1937, at the height of Stalin’s purges, he was recalled to the Soviet Union and soon arrested and tortured until he “confessed” to selling out to the enemy. He was sentenced to twenty years of hard labor. His wife and his mother committed suicide after they were ostracized and deprived of food because they were relatives of an “enemy of the people.”

Still in the camps, despite his poor health and the risk of severe punishment, he wrote his eyewitness account of Stalin’s Gulag. The memoir was smuggled outside the camp by his fellow inmates and his second wife, whom he had met and married in the camps.

== Later life ==
After his release in 1954, he worked at various medical research organizations in Moscow as a translator and medical consultant.

In 1963, the journal Asia and Africa Today (Russian: Азиа и Африка Сегодня) published a series of sketches about his trips in Africa. In 1973, a film titled A Plainclothes Man (Russian: Человек в Штатском) based on his script was released. In 1974, the journal Our Contemporary (Russian: Наш Современник) published his short novel Para Bellum, a thinly-disguised account of one of his pre-World War II foreign operations. None of his memoirs was published in his lifetime.

Bystrolyotov died on May 3, 1975, and was buried at the Khovanskoye Cemetery, Moscow.

== Legacy ==
He is considered one of the heroes of Russian foreign intelligence. (Note: “One of the most successful Soviet illegals”; “[An] extremely versatile intelligence officer was indeed legendary in the 1930s; in fact, with his espionage history, he is the nearest thing to James Bond." - Oleg Gordievsky, former KGB Colonel and author (together with Christopher Andrew) of KGB: The Inside Story; Instructions from the Centre: Top Secret Files on KGB Foreign Operations, 1975-8, and other books on Russian intelligence.; “[O]ne of the most prominent undercover operatives, a mega-spy, brave and talented. In fact, he was the best Russian spy ever, eclipsing even the legendary Richard Sorge.” - Mikhail Lyubimov, KGB veteran, historian of Russian secret service, author of the book Spies I Like and Spies I Hate and many other books on espionage.; “Thanks to Bystrolyotov and others, [Soviet intelligence] received more assistance from espionage than any similar agency in the West.”; “His skill at adopting the identity of an aristocrat came useful during his years as an illegal.”; “[An] experienced and colorful operative... Possessed of great personal courage and a dashing manner, he was a master of many languages and disguises and used a variety of identities when traveling between the countries of Western Europe.” - William E. Duff, Special Agent of the FBI (Foreign Counterintelligence Department), author of the book A Time for Spies: Theodore Stephanovich Mally and the Era of the Great Illegals.) His portrait is displayed on the walls of the secret “Memory Room” at the Russian Foreign Intelligence Service headquarters. On November 21, 2011, the International Spy Museum in Washington, D.C. unveiled an exhibit devoted to him.
