= Catherine Pine =

British suffrage activist

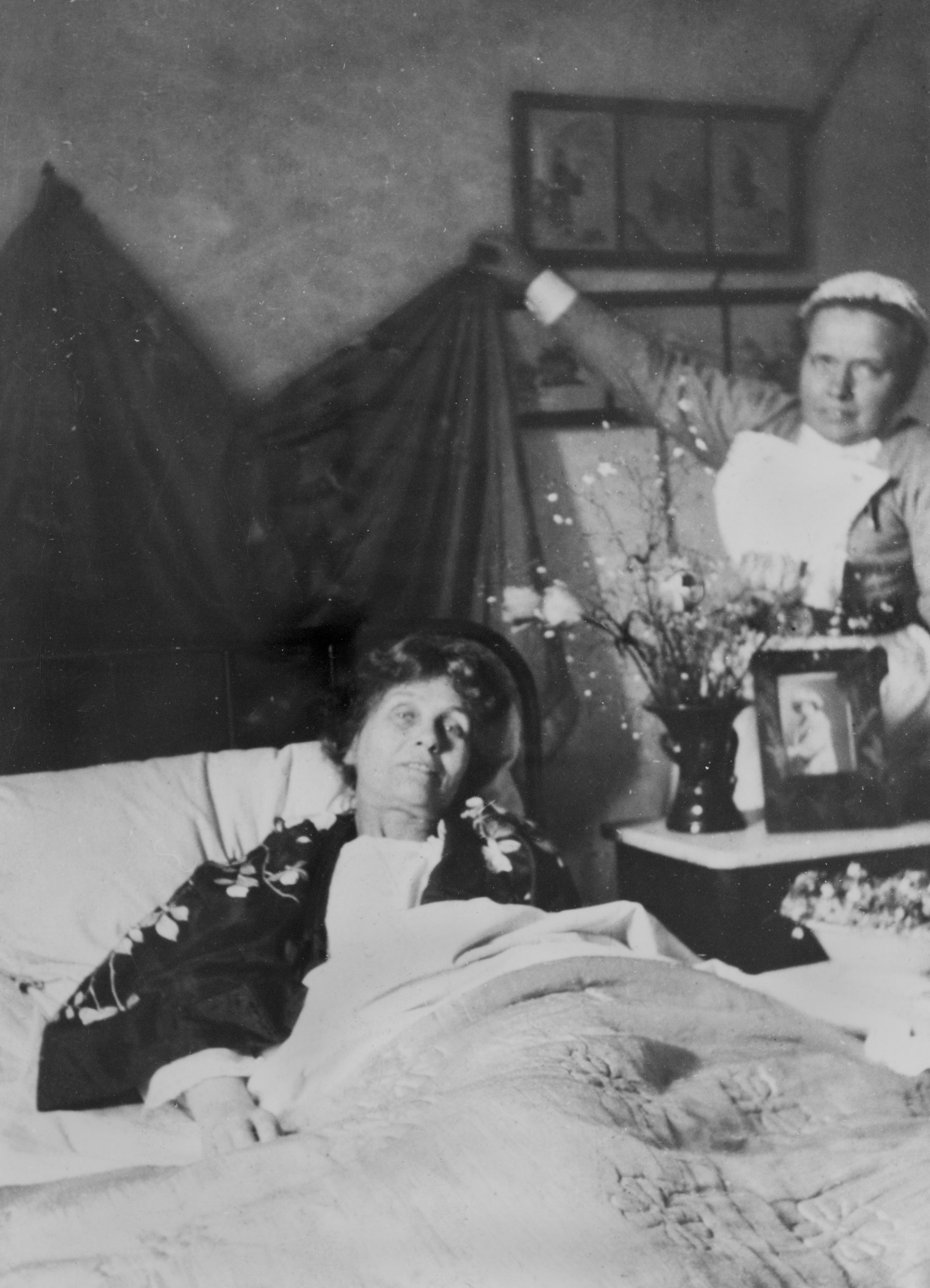
- Pine in 1913, nursing Emmeline Pankhurst
- Born: Catherine Emily Pine; 7 May 1864; Maidstone, Kent, England
- Died: 14 August 1941 (aged 77); Finsbury Extra, Rochester, Kent
- Occupations: Nurse and suffragette

Catherine Emily Pine (7 May 1864 – 14 August 1941) was active in the women's suffrage movement in Britain. She nursed the suffragette Emmeline Pankhurst and her son Henry. Pine travelled with Pankhurst before returning to Britain permanently in 1924.

== Family and education ==
Catherine Emily Pine was born in Maidstone on 7 May 1864. Her parents were Robert Pine, a corn merchant, and his wife, Anne Bret. Catherine trained to be a nurse. Pine attended a school for nursing and trained as a nurse at St Bartholomew's Hospital between 1895 and 1897. After qualification she remained at St Bartholomew's until she was promoted to Hospital Sister in 1900. She was described by the staff as "‘punctual, very kind and attentive, very patient and even tempered".

== Career and support for suffragettes ==
Pine opened a nursing home in 1907 in Pembridge Gardens, Notting Hill, London, working with Nurse Gertrude Townend. Suffragettes who had gone on hunger strike and were forcibly fed in prison were taken there after being released to receive medical care and recuperate. Emmeline Pankhurst was one of the imprisoned suffragettes that underwent care at the nursing home and she soon viewed Pine as a friend and a competent nurse. Pine also took care of Pankhurst's son, who was suffering from an inflammation of the bladder, until he died of poliomyelitis in 1910.

When the 1911 census was enumerated, Pine gave the details of her patients and wrote across her census form: "Above names at request. For the rest No Votes No Information."

== Relationship with the Pankhursts ==
In 1912 Pine and Townend assisted Christabel Pankhurst in escaping arrest by providing her with a nurse's uniform and access to a friend's house.

From 1917 Pine worked in the Pankhurst family home at Tower Cressy, Campden Hill but was not in sympathy with the Montessori teaching methods used by Jenny (Jane) Kenney for the children there. Pine accompanied the Pankhursts when they went to Paris in early 1919, while Emmeline worked in France for the suffrage movement. That September, they sailed to the United States and Canada. Often, Emmeline was not at home, so Pine was charged with the duties of taking care of Pankhurst's children.

== Later life ==
Pine returned to England in 1923 and found employment at Cottage Hospital, Herne Bay, Kent. She attended Pankhurst's funeral in July 1928.

Pine suffered a stroke and died in 1941.

== Suffragette Medal ==
Pine was awarded a suffragette medal and left it to the History Section of the British College of Nurses, which was founded in 1926 by Ethel Gordon Fenwick, a former matron of St Bartholomew’s where Pine had trained and worked. The medal was likely sold when this organisation folded in 1956 and was later owned by an American collector before being acquired by a researcher.

Pine's medal has been put on show for the first time at the Florence Nightingale Museum in London from February to October 2026.

Pine's library and mementos were given to the Museum of London.
