= Walter Krivitsky =

Soviet spy and defector (1899–1941)

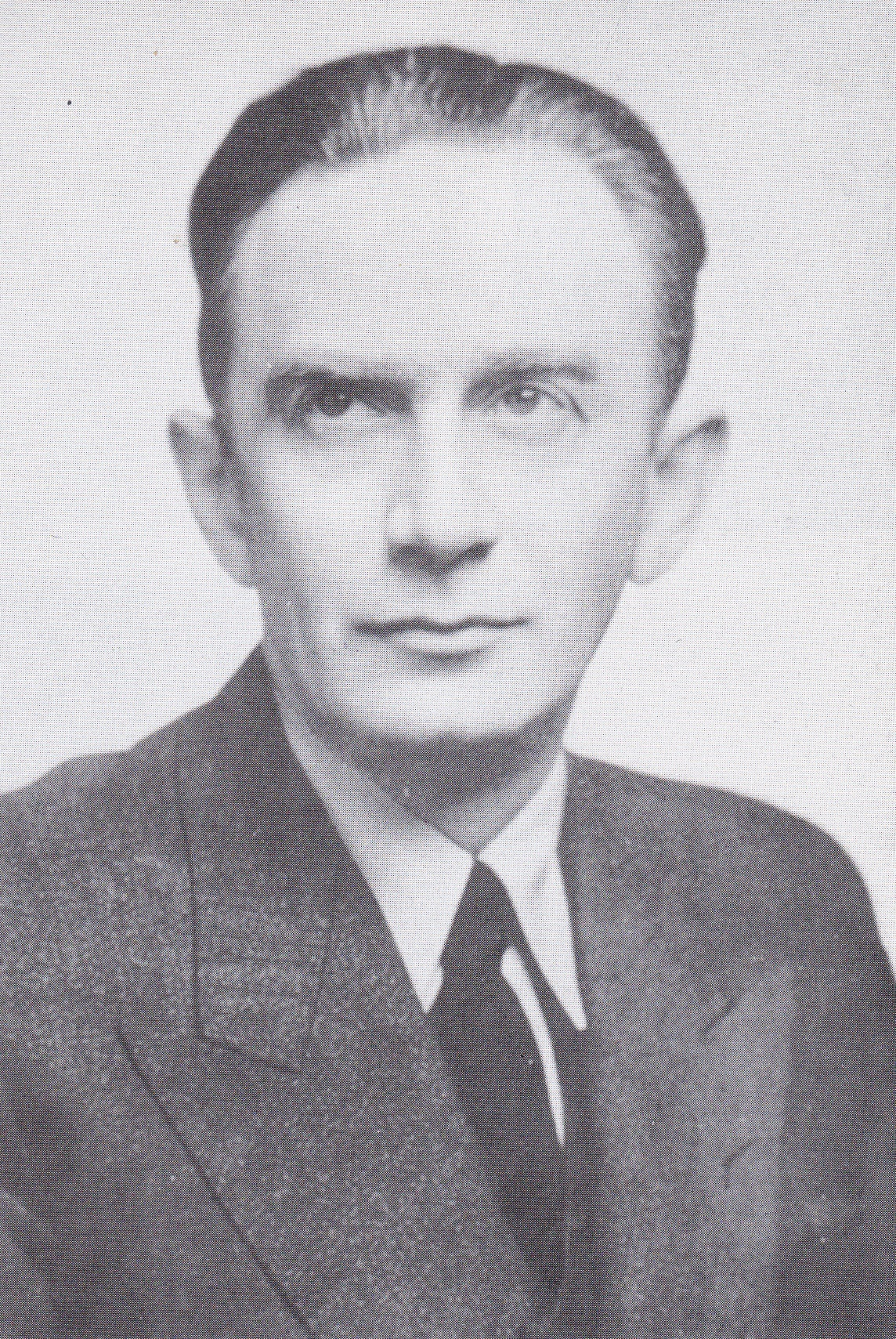
- Walter Krivitsky in 1939
- Born: Samuel Gershevich Ginsberg; June 28, 1899; Pidvolochysk, Kingdom of Galicia and Lodomeria, Austria-Hungary
- Died: February 10, 1941 (aged 41); Washington, D.C., United States
- Cause of death: Gunshot to the head
- Occupation: Foreign intelligence
- Spouse(s): Antonina ("Tonya Krivitsky", "Tonia Krivitsky", "Antonina Thomas")
- Children: Aleksandr ("Alek")
- Espionage activity
- Allegiance: Russian SFSR (1920–1922); Soviet Union (1922–1937)
- Service branch: Cheka, GRU
- Service years: 1920–1937
- Codename: "Walter Thomas", "Walter Poref", "Schoenborn"
- Other work: Samuel Ginzberg, Shmelka Ginsberg

Walter Germanovich Krivitsky (Russian: Ва́льтер Ге́рманович Криви́цкий; born Samuel Gershevich Ginsberg; Russian: Самуил Гершевич Гинзберг; June 28, 1899 – February 10, 1941) was a Soviet military intelligence spymaster who defected to the West and revealed plans for the signing of the Molotov–Ribbentrop Pact.

== Early life ==
Walter Krivitsky was born on June 28, 1899, to Jewish parents as Samuel Ginsberg in Podwołoczyska, Galicia, Austria-Hungary (now Pidvolochysk, Ukraine). He adopted the name "Krivitsky," which was based on the Slavic root for "crooked, twisted". It was a revolutionary nom de guerre when he entered the Cheka, the Bolshevik security and intelligence service.

== Espionage ==
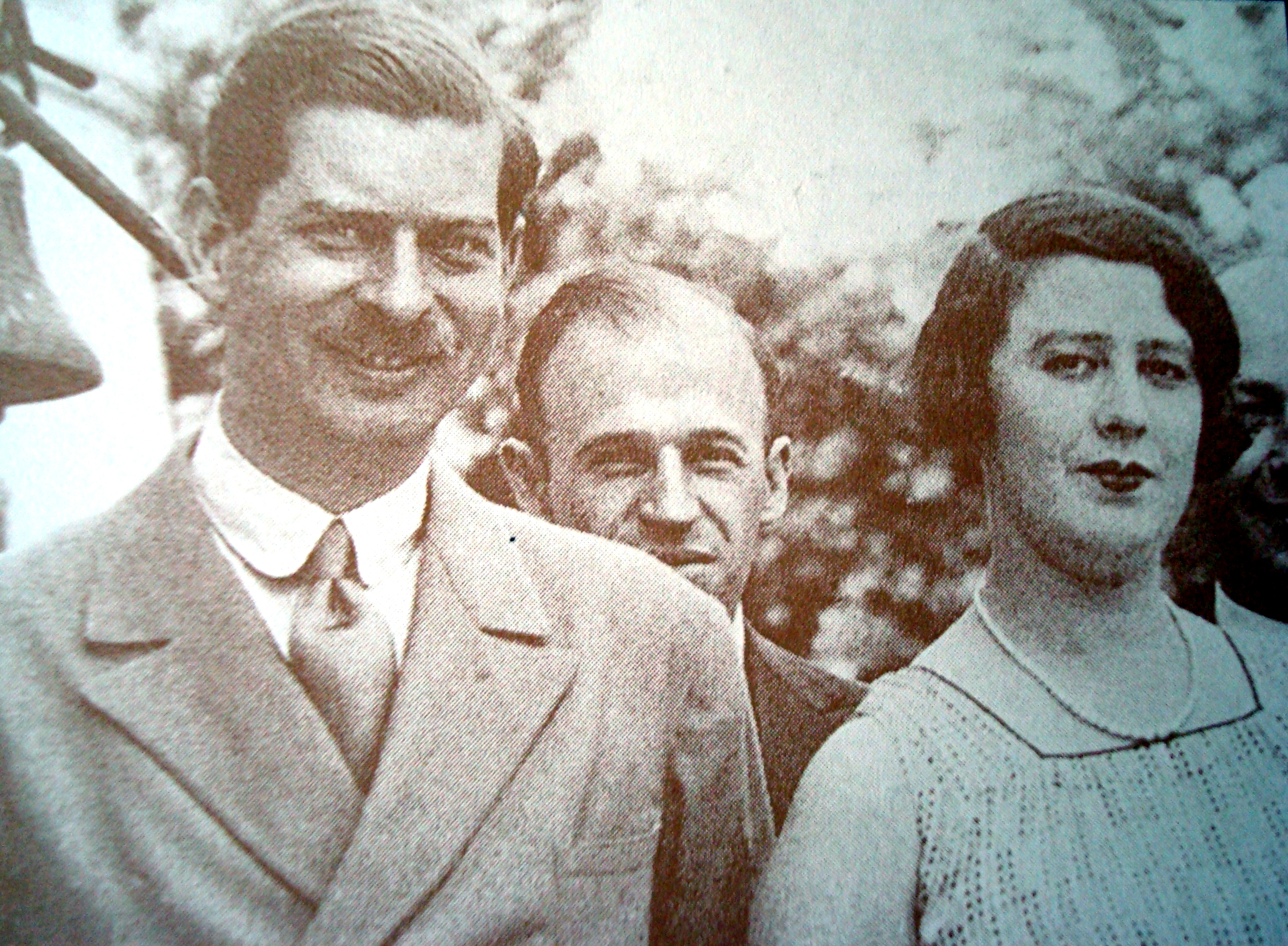
Magda Lupescu (here, with King Carol II of Romania) was one of Krivitsky's recruits

Krivitsky operated as an illegal resident spy, with false name and papers, in Germany, Poland, Czechoslovakia, Austria, Italy, and Hungary. He rose to the rank of control officer. He is credited with having organised industrial sabotage, stealing plans for submarines and planes, intercepting correspondence between Nazi Germany and Imperial Japan, and recruiting many agents, including Magda Lupescu ("Madame Lepescu") and Noel Field.

Following the decision to create the International Brigade in September 1936, Krivitsky organised in The Hague the recruitment of volunteers for the Spanish Civil War.

In May 1937, Krivitsky was sent to The Hague, Netherlands, to operate as the rezident (regional control officer), operating under the cover of an antiquarian. There he co-ordinated intelligence operations throughout Western Europe.

== Defection ==
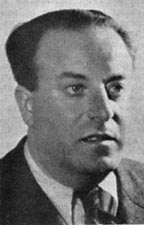
The assassination of childhood friend and comrade, Ignace Reiss, in September 1937 provoked Krivitsky's immediate defection

While he was in the Hague, the General Staff of the Red Army was subjected to the Great Purge in Moscow, which Krivitsky and his close friend, Ignace Reiss, also then stationed abroad, found deeply disturbing. Reiss wanted to defect, but Krivitsky repeatedly held back. Finally, Reiss defected, as he announced in a defiant letter to Moscow. His assassination, in Switzerland, in September 1937 prompted Krivitsky to defect the following month.

In Paris, Krivitsky began to write articles and made contact with Lev Sedov, Trotsky's son, and the Trotskyists. There, he also met undercover Soviet spy Mark Zborowski, known as "Etienne," whom Sedov had sent to protect him. Sedov died mysteriously in February 1938, but Krivitsky eluded attempts to kill or kidnap him in France, partly by fleeing to Hyères.

As a result of Krivitsky's debriefing, the British were able to arrest John Herbert King, a cypher clerk in the Foreign Office. He also gave a vague description of two other Soviet spies, Donald Maclean and John Cairncross but without enough detail to enable their arrest. The Soviet intelligence operation in the United Kingdom was thrown into disarray for a time.

He also identified Brian Goold-Verschoyle as the courier between King in the Foreign Office and his NKVD handler, Theodore Maly. But by 1938, disillusioned by the Soviet policy he had witnessed in Spain, the Irish communist had disappeared into the Soviet Gulag.

== Anti-Stalinist activism ==
At the end of 1938, anticipating the Nazi conquest of Europe, Krivitsky sailed from France to the United States. Krivitsky did not stop with defection; he went on to become a vocal member of the anti-Stalinist Left.

=== In Stalin's Secret Service ===
With the help of journalist Isaac Don Levine and literary agent Paul Wohl, Krivitsky produced an inside account of Stalin's underhanded methods. It appeared in book form as In Stalin's Secret Service (UK title: I Was Stalin's Agent, published by the Right Book Club), published on November 15, 1939, after appearing first in sensational serial form in April 1939 in the top magazine of the time, the Saturday Evening Post. (The title had appeared as a phrase in an article written by Reiss's wife on the first anniversary of her husband's assassination: "Reiss... had been in Stalin's secret service for many years and knew what fate to expect.") The book received a tepid review by the very influential New York Times. Attacked by the American left, Krivitsky was vindicated when the German-Soviet Nonaggression Pact, which he had predicted, was signed in August 1939.

=== Testimony ===
Torn between a lingering dedication to Marxist-Leninist ideology and his growing detestation of Stalinism, Krivitsky came to believe that it was his duty to cooperate with the U.S. intelligence community. That decision caused him much mental anguish, as he impressed on his former agent and fellow defector Whittaker Chambers, but to whom Krivitsky ultimately stated, "In our time, informing is a duty" (recounted by Chambers in his autobiography, Witness).

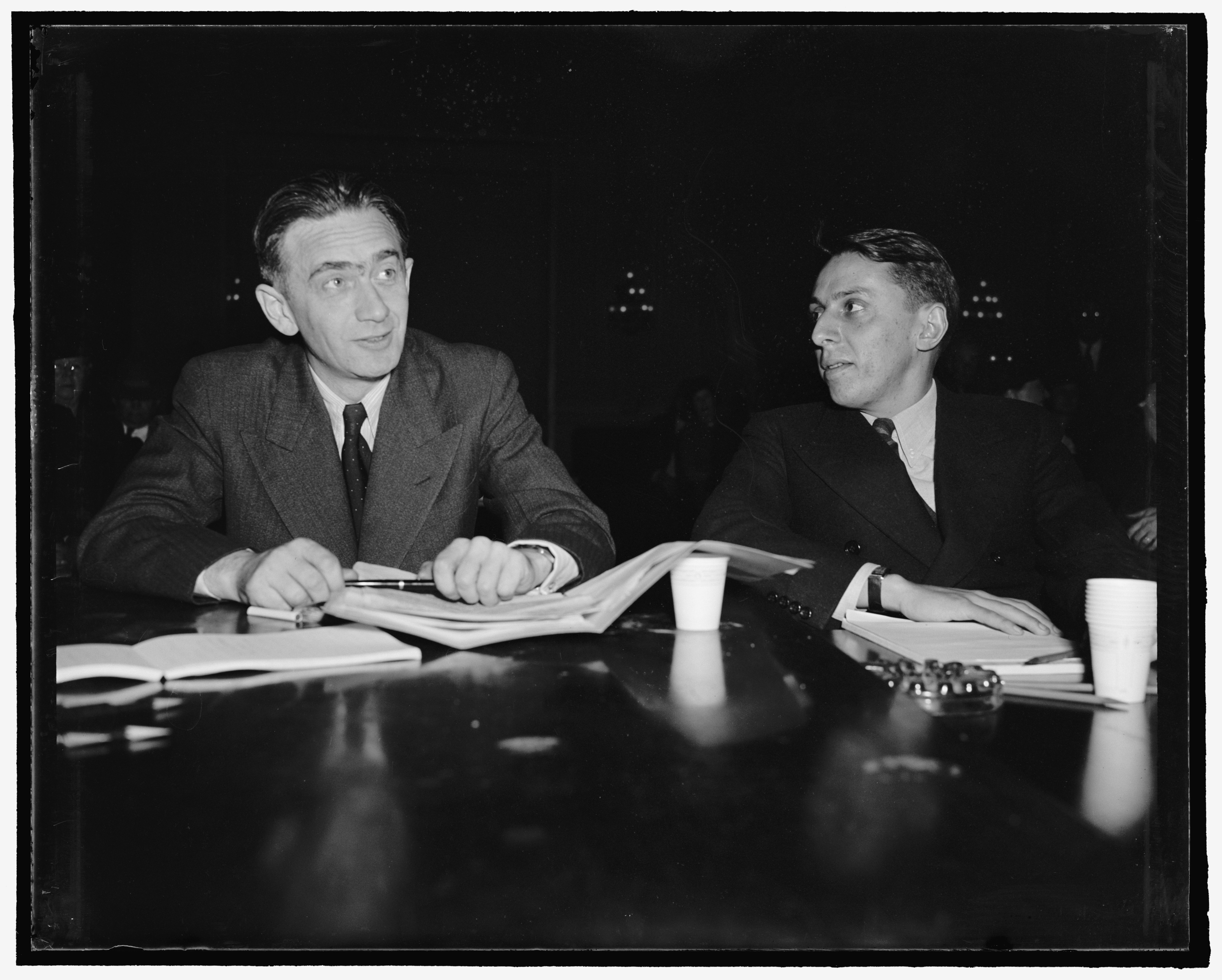
Krivitsky (left) testifies before the Dies Committee, October 11, 1939. At right is Boris Shub, interpreter.

Krivitsky testified before the Dies Committee (later to become the House Un-American Activities Committee) in October 1939, and sailed as "Walter Thomas" to London in January 1940 to be debriefed by Jane Archer (Jane Sissmore) of British domestic counterintelligence, MI5. In doing so, he revealed much about Soviet espionage. It is a matter of controversy whether he gave MI5 clues to the identity of Soviet agents Donald Maclean and Kim Philby. It is certain, however, that Lavrenty Beria, the head of the People's Commissariat for Internal Affairs (NKVD), learned of Krivitsky's testimony and ordered operations to assassinate him.

== Death ==
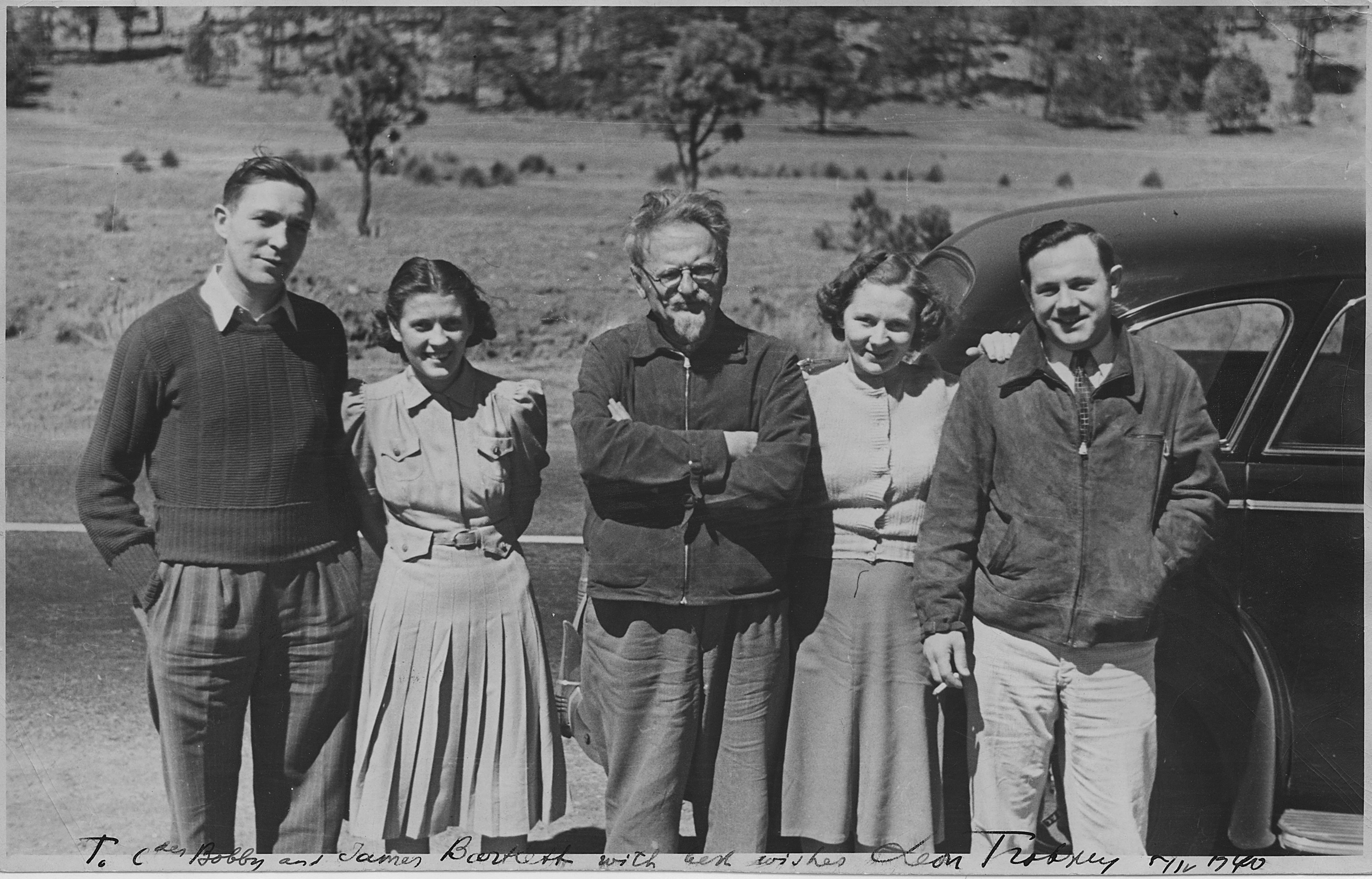
Leon Trotsky, here with Americans including Harry DeBoer (left) in Mexico in 1940, shortly before his assassination and only months before Krivitsky's death

Krivitsky soon returned to North America, landing in Canada. Always in trouble with the U.S. Immigration and Naturalization Service, Krivitsky was not able to return there until November 1940. Krivitsky retained Louis Waldman to represent him on legal matters. (Waldman was a long-time friend of Isaac Don Levine.) Meanwhile, the assassination of Trotsky in Mexico on August 21, 1940, convinced him that he was now at the top of the NKVD hit list. His last two months in New York were filled with plans to settle in Virginia and to write but also with doubts and dread.

On February 10, 1941, at 9:30 a.m., Krivitsky was found dead in the Bellevue Hotel (now Kimpton George Hotel) in Washington, DC, by a chambermaid, with three suicide notes by the bed. His body was lying in a pool of blood, caused by a single bullet wound to the right temple from a .38 caliber revolver found grasped in Krivitsky's right hand. A report dated June 10, 1941, indicates he had been dead for approximately six hours.

According to many sources (including Krivitsky himself), he was murdered by Soviet intelligence, but the official investigation, unaware of the NKVD manhunt, concluded that Krivitsky committed suicide. People with close ties to Krivitsky later recounted opposite interpretations of his death:

- Suicide: Reiss' wife wrote in 1969:

In the United States, he had to make a new start in life, without knowing the country or the language. He did find friends, good friends, but among them he realized how frightfully alone he was... He lived in relative security and even affluence from the sale of his articles. His family was safe and well cared for, he had friends, it seemed he could start a new life. But something else had happened. For the first time he had the leisure to see himself in his new situation. He had broken with his old life and had not built a new one. He went to a hotel in Washington, wrote a letter to his wife and one to his friends, and put a bullet through his head... To those who knew his handwriting, his style, his expressions, there could be no doubt that he had written them.

- Assassination: Whittaker Chambers wrote in 1952:

One night one of my close friends burst into my office at Time. He was holding a yellow tear-off that had just come over the teletype.
"They have murdered the General," he said. "Krivitsky has been killed."
Krivitsky's body had been found in a room in a small Washington hotel a few blocks from the Capitol. He had a room permanently reserved at a large downtown hotel where he had always stayed when he was in Washington. He had never stayed at the small hotel before. Why had he gone there?
He had been shot through the head and there was evidence that he had shot himself. At whose command? He had left a letter in which he gave his wife and children the unlikely advice that the Soviet Government and people were their best friends. Previously, he had warned them that, if he were found dead, never under any circumstances to believe that he had committed suicide. Who had forced my friend to write the letter? I remembered the saying: "Any fool can commit a murder, but it takes an artist to commit a good natural death..."
Krivitsky also told me something else that night. A few days before, he had taken off the revolver that he usually carried and placed it in a bureau drawer. His seven-year-old son watched him. "Why do you put away the revolver?" he asked. "In America," said Krivitsky, "nobody carries a revolver." "Papa," said the child, "carry the revolver."

- Assassination: Victor Serge wrote in 1944:

X., arriving from New York, confidentially assures me that the name of the GPU agent who assassinated Walter Krivitsky in a Washington hotel (winter 1940–1941) is known, as well as all the details of the affair. Nevertheless, the “suicide” version remains quasi-official.

- Assassination: William J. Hood, former CIA head of counterintelligence, wrote in 1984:

It has been suggested that Krivitsky was induced to commit suicide because of threats against his family. But Krivitsky knew what Stalin's promises were worth. It is beyond belief that any such pleas would have convinced him quietly to take his life. The evidence is inconclusive but seems to point to murder.

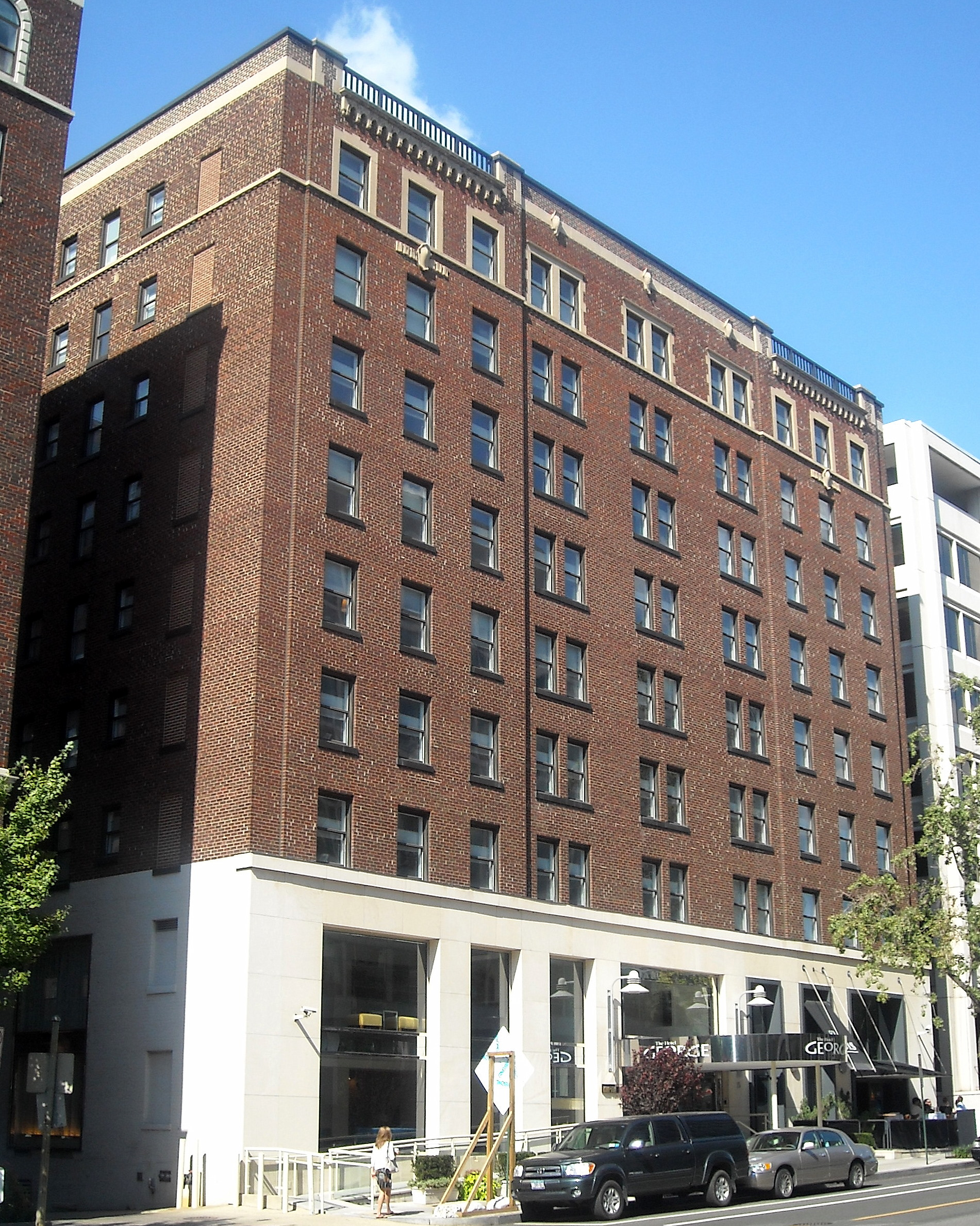
Krivitsky was found dead in the Kimpton George Hotel, just a few blocks from the U.S. Capitol, hours before he was to appear before another Congressional committee.

Speculation persists into the 21st century. For example, in 2017, Anthony Percy's book Misdefending the Realm (Buckingham: University of Buckingham Press, 2017) argued that Krivitsky was the UK's most important source on Soviet plans, did not receive action from MI5 on the intelligence that he supplied, and was assassinated by Soviet intelligence after Guy Burgess informed Soviet superiors about him. The assassination, Percy argues, cleared the threat of exposure of the Cambridge Five and other moles.

=== Survivors ===
At the first news of his death, Whittaker Chambers found Krivitsky's wife, Antonina ("Tonia" according to Kern, "Tonya" according to Chambers) and son Alek in New York City. He took them by train to Florida, where they stayed with Chambers's family, which had already fled New Smyrna. Both families hid there several months, fearing further Soviet reprisals. The families then returned to Chambers's farm in Westminster, Maryland. Within a short time, however, Tonia and Alek returned to New York.

His wife and son lived in poverty for the rest of their lives. Alek died of a brain tumor in his early 30s after he had served in the United States Navy and studied at Columbia University. Tonia, who changed her surname legally to "Thomas", continued to live and work in New York City until she retired to Ossining, where she died at 94 in 1996 in a nursing home.

== Works ==
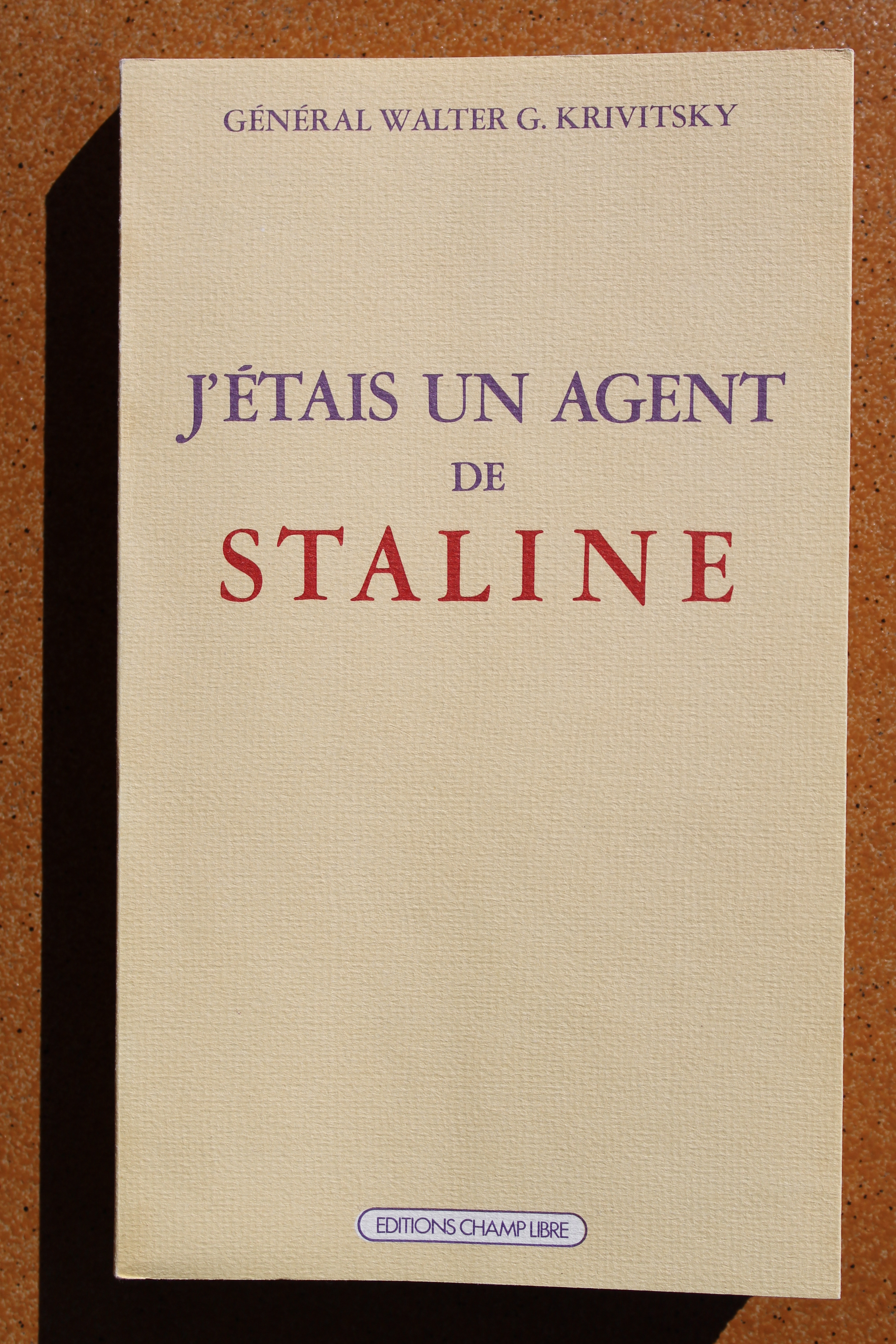
French edition of In Stalin's secret service, éd. Champ libre

- In Stalin's Secret Service (1939) (second edition 1939, 1979, 1985, 2000)
  - Agent de Staline (French, 1940)
  - Byłem agentem Stalina (Polish, 1964)
  - Я был агентом Сталина. Записки советского разведчика (Russian, 1991)
- Rusia en España (Spanish, 1939)
- MI5 Debriefing & Other Documents on Soviet Intelligence (2004)

== See also ==
- List of Eastern Bloc defectors
- List of KGB defectors

== Sources ==
- Chambers, Whittaker (1952). Witness. Random House. ISBN 0-89526-571-0.
- Kern, Gary (2004). A Death in Washington: Walter G. Krivitsky and the Stalin Terror. Enigma Books. ISBN 978-1-929631-25-4.
- Philipps, Roland. 2018. A Spy Named Orphan: The Enigma of Donald Maclean. New York: W.W. Norton & Company.
- Poretsky, Elisabeth K. (1969). Our Own People: A Memoir of "Ignace Reiss" and His Friends. London: Oxford University Press. LCCN 70449412.
- "Files on Walter G. Krivitsky". Federal Bureau of Investigation (FBI). n.d.
- Volodarsky, Boris (2014). Stalin's Agent: The Life and Death of Alexander Orlov. Oxford University Press. ISBN 978-0199656585.
