= Sean McAteer =

Irish communist (1892–1937)

- Born: 1892; Ireland
- Died: 1937 (aged 44–45)
- Cause of death: Execution by firing squad during Great Purge
- Political party: Socialist Party of Ireland
- Other political affiliations: Industrial Workers of the World

Sean McAteer (1892–1937) was an Irish communist killed in Stalin's Great Purge.

== Biography ==
McAteer, a dock labourer, was involved with the Irish Citizen Army and the Socialist Party of Ireland. In 1915 he left for the USA. While in the USA he held membership of the Industrial Workers of the World (the Wobblies). Arrested in San Francisco in 1917 for draft dodging, he was jailed for three months before being released and going on the run. He was later imprisoned again in Shoshone, Idaho, under the name John McEntee, on a charge of the anti-union offence of "criminal syndicalism".

Back in Ireland, McAteer adopted the name Sean Mac an tSaoir. He returned to take part in the Irish Civil War on the side of the Anti-Treaty IRA.

On 11 June 1923, McAteer and Jim Phelan participated in a robbery of a post office on Scotland Road in Liverpool, England. The operation, carried out with guns supplied by English communists (including the future Liverpool council leader Jack Braddock) was intended to raise funds for the IRA, though Phelan would later insist it was non-political. When the young women working in the post office panicked, Phelan fled the scene. McAteer, however, shot the girls' brother when he tried to intervene. A pursuing crowd captured Phelan, who as a participant in the raid was held legally responsible for the killing. Having confessed and offered to turn king's evidence, he was tried and sentenced to death on 9 July 1923, though this was commuted to life imprisonment the following month. McAteer evaded capture by escaping to the Soviet Union.

Once in the USSR, McAteer worked as an English teacher in Odessa, Ukraine. Here he married his wife Tamara and had a daughter, Maria.

McAteer's outspoken and erratic behaviour eventually drew dangerous attention during the Stalinist purges. In 1937, after a drunken outburst in which he accused the Communist Party boss in Odessa of being a Trotskyist, he was charged with "subversive wrecking", "counter-revolutionary bourgeois thoughts", and espionage. On 16 November 1937, he was sentenced to death by shooting and executed before the month's end.

Following petitions from his wife and daughter, he was posthumously rehabilitated in the 1950s.
