= Mikhail Frunze =

Soviet army officer (1885–1925)

- Михаил Фрунзе
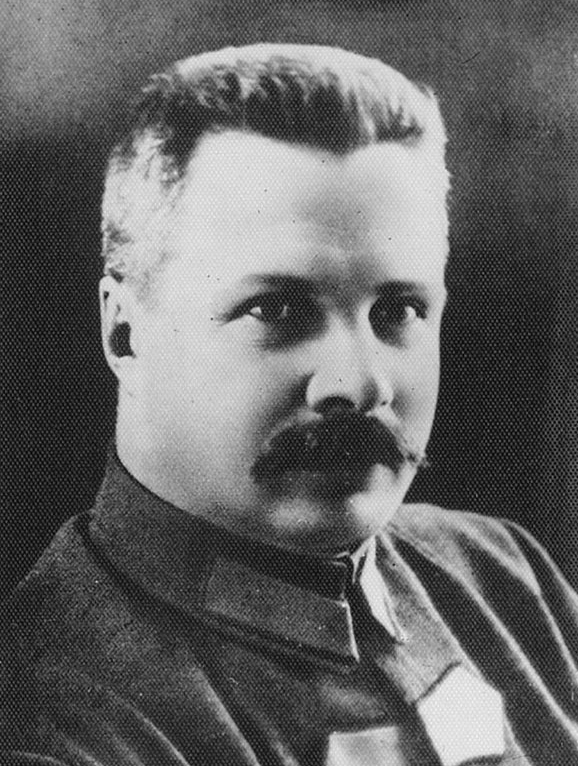
- Frunze in 1925

People's Commissar for Military and Naval Affairs of the Soviet Union
- In office 25 January 1925 – 31 October 1925
- General Secretary: Joseph Stalin
- Premier: Alexey Rykov
- Preceded by: Leon Trotsky
- Succeeded by: Kliment Voroshilov

Candidate member of the 13th Politburo
- In office 2 June 1924 – 31 October 1925

Personal details
- Born: Mikhail Vasilyevich Frunze; 2 February 1885 Pishpek, Semirechye Oblast, Russian Turkestan, Russian Empire
- Died: 31 October 1925 (aged 40) Moscow, Russian SFSR, Soviet Union
- Resting place: Kremlin Wall Necropolis, Moscow
- Party: RSDLP (Bolsheviks) (1903–1918); All-Union Communist Party (Bolsheviks) (1918–1925)
- Spouse: Sophia Alekseevna Popova (1917–1925)
- Children: Timur (son); Tatyana (daughter)

Mikhail Vasilyevich Frunze (Russian: Михаил Васильевич Фрунзе; Romanian: Mihail Frunză; 2 February 1885 – 31 October 1925) was a Soviet revolutionary, politician, army officer and military theorist.

Born to a Romanian father and a Russian mother in Russian Turkestan, Frunze attended the Saint Petersburg Polytechnical University and became an active member of the Russian Social Democratic Labour Party (RSDLP). Following the RSDLP ideological split, he sided with Vladimir Lenin's Bolshevik faction. He led the textile workers strike in Ivanovo during the 1905 Russian Revolution, for which he was later sentenced to death before being commuted to life-long hard labour in Siberia. He escaped ten years later and took active part in the 1917 February Revolution in Minsk and the October Revolution in Moscow. Frunze distinguished himself as one of the most successful Red Army commanders during the Russian Civil War, achieving major victories over the White Army of Pyotr Wrangel in Crimea and Nestor Makhno's anarchist movement in Ukraine. In 1921, Frunze was elected to the Central Committee of the Communist Party. In 1925, he was named chairman of the Revolutionary Military Council.

Frunze died in 1925 from chloroform poisoning during surgery for a chronic ulcer. It has been alleged that Frunze was assassinated by Joseph Stalin, who arranged the surgery. He was buried in the Kremlin Wall Necropolis. The capital of the Kirghiz SSR and his birthplace, Pishpek (modern Bishkek), was renamed after him from 1926 until 1991. The Frunze Military Academy, one of the most prestigious military educational institutions in the Soviet Union, was also named in his honour.

== Life and political activity ==
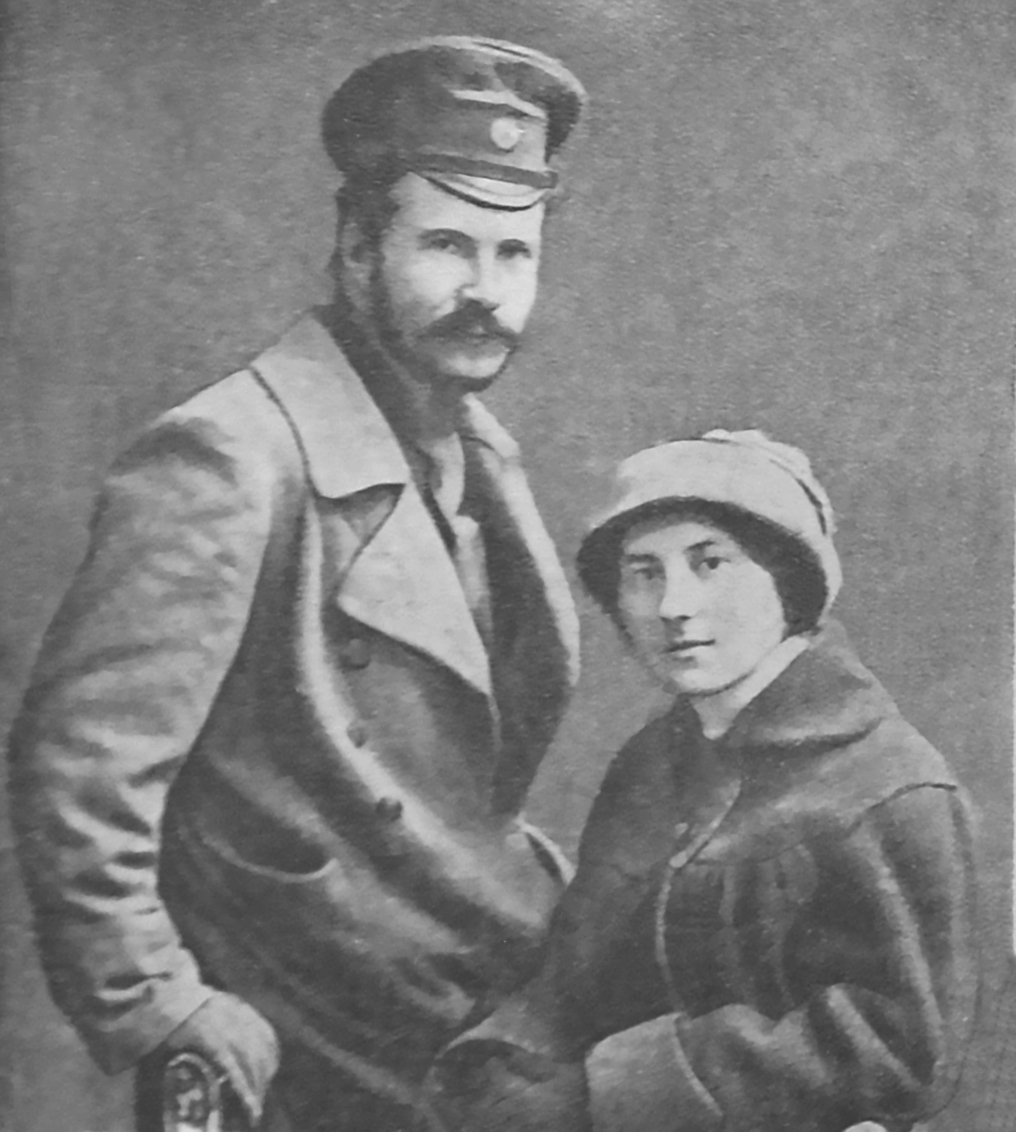
Mikhail Frunze and his wife Sophia Frunze. Minsk 1917.

Frunze was born in 1885 in Pishpek (now Bishkek in Kyrgyzstan), then a small Imperial Russian garrison town in the Kyrgyz part of Russian Turkestan (Semirechye Oblast). His father was a Bessarabian Romanian para-medic (feldsher) (originally from the Kherson Governorate) and his mother was Russian. Frunze began his higher studies at Verniy (present-day Almaty), and in 1904 he attended the Saint Petersburg Polytechnical University. Frunze became active in the Russian Social Democratic Labour Party (RSDLP). At the Second Congress of the RSDLP in London (1903), Vladimir Lenin and Julius Martov, the two main leaders, confronted each other in an ideological split over party tactics (Martov argued for a large party of activists, whilst Lenin wanted a small group of professional revolutionaries with a large fringe group of sympathisers). Frunze at the age of 18 sided with Lenin's majority, the so-called Bolsheviks ("majoritarians"), as opposed to Martov's minority, the Mensheviks (or "minoritarians").

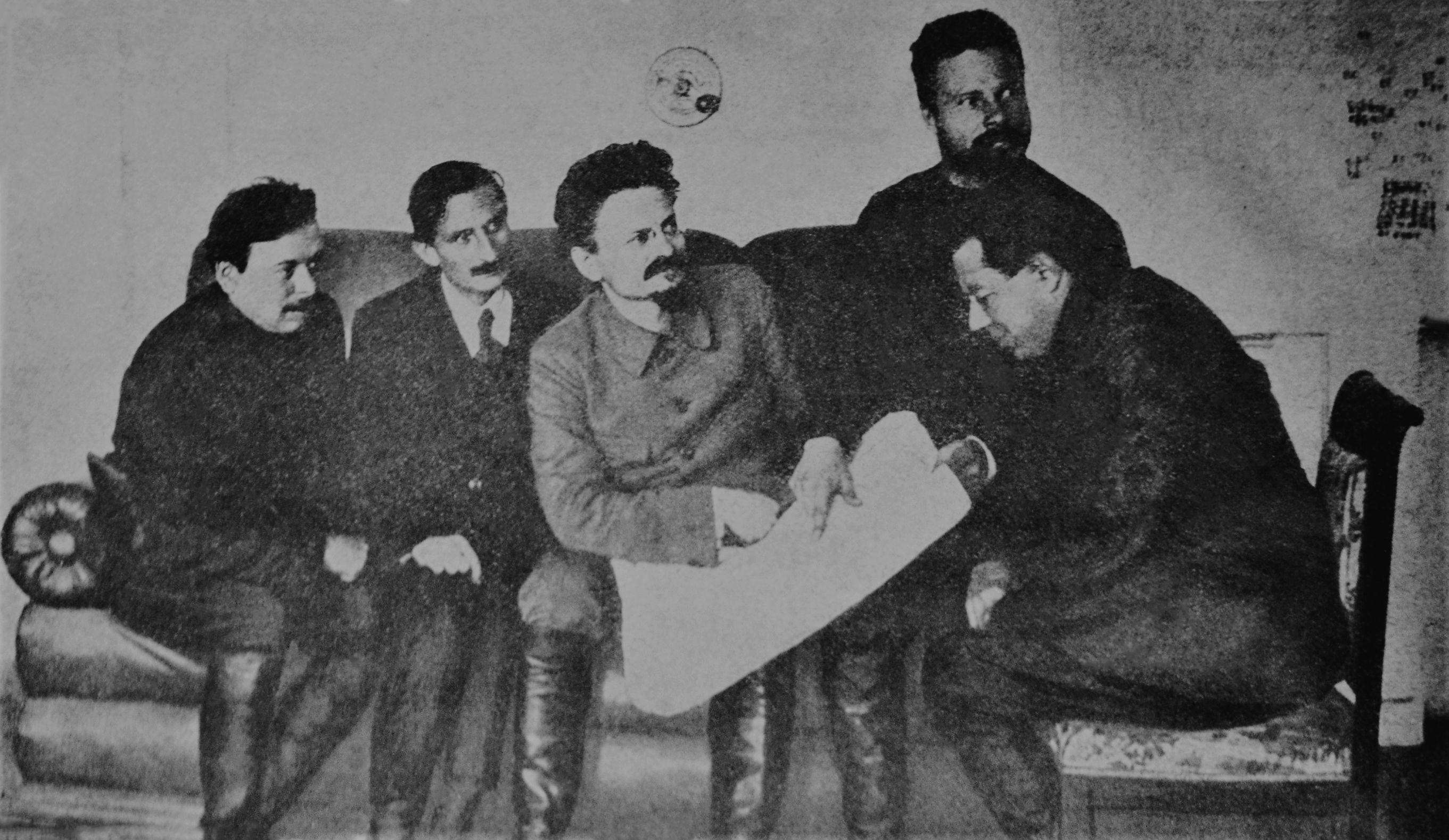
Béla Kun, Alfred Rosmer, Leon Trotsky, Mikhail Frunze and Sergey Gusev. Kharkiv Ukraine 1920.

Two years after the Second Congress, Frunze became an important leader in the 1905 Revolution. He led striking textile workers in Shuya and Ivanovo. Following the end of the movement, Frunze was arrested in 1907 and sentenced to death; he was imprisoned and spent several months on death row awaiting his execution. His sentence was commuted to life at hard labour. After 10 years in Siberian prisons, Frunze escaped to Chita. There he became editor of the Bolshevik weekly newspaper Vostochnoe Obozrenie (Eastern Review).

During the February Revolution of 1917, Frunze headed the Minsk civilian militia before his election as president of the Byelorussian Soviet. He later went to Moscow and led an armed force of workers to aid in the struggle for control of the city.

== Russian Civil War ==
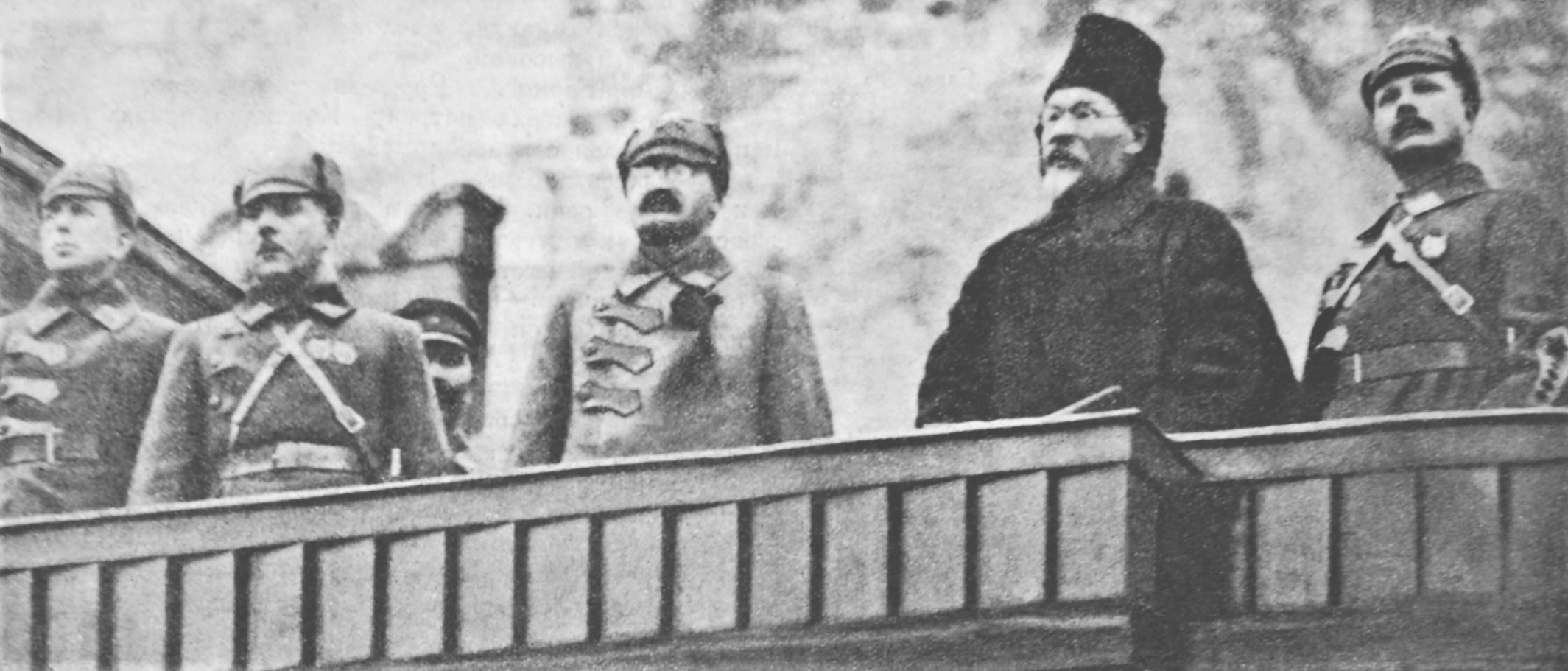
From left Andrei Bubnov, Kliment Voroshilov, Leon Trotsky, Mikhail Kalinin and Mikhail Frunze attend The October Revolution parade on Red Square 7 November 1924.

After the October Revolution of 1917, Frunze was appointed in 1918 as Military Commissar for the Ivanovo-Voznesensk Province. In the course of the Russian Civil War of 1917–1922, he was appointed as head of the Southern Army Group of the Red Army Eastern Front (March 1919). After Frunze's troops defeated Admiral Alexander Kolchak and the White Army in Omsk, Leon Trotsky (the head of the Red Army) gave overall command of the Eastern Front to him (19 July 1919). Frunze drove out Basmachi insurgents and White Army troops from his native Turkestan. He captured Khiva in February and Bukhara in September 1920.

In November 1920, Frunze's army took the Crimea and managed to push White general Pyotr Wrangel and his troops out of Russia. As commander of the southern front, Frunze also led the destruction of Nestor Makhno's anarchist movement in Ukraine and the nationalist movement of Symon Petliura.

In December 1921, Frunze visited Ankara, during the Turkish War of Independence, as an ambassador of the Ukrainian SSR, and established Turkish–Soviet relations. A statue of Frunze is a part of the Republic Monument at the Taksim Square, in Istanbul.

In 1921, Frunze was elected to the Central Committee of the Russian Bolshevik Party. On 2 June 1924 he became candidate member of the Politburo and in January 1925, became the Chairman of the Revolutionary Military Council.

Frunze's support of Grigory Zinoviev was enough to attract the unwelcome attention of Joseph Stalin, one of Zinoviev's chief opponents. They had previously been on good terms, as Stalin had displayed respect towards his fellow "old guard" revolutionary and former prisoner.

== Greek genocide ==
=== Frunze as an eyewitness ===
Frunze was a key eyewitness to the Greek genocide in the visit he made to Turkey between 1921 and 1922. As an individual representing a pro-Turkish state, the Soviet Union, his eyewitness account is particularly notable.

During his diplomatic mission, Frunze documented the total decimation of Greek communities in Pontus. He noted that all Greek males over sixteen were deported and forced into labour battalions, writing how Topal Osman's irregulars "burnt, raped, and killed without exception all Greeks and Armenians, killed children by smashing them against the pavement". He expressed his "moral repugnance" to the "sheer, wild terror" he witnessed. Frunze noted an incident in his memoirs:

I shall remember this road for the rest of my life. Along its entire 30-verst length we constantly ran into bodies. I personally counted 58, many of them raped and mutilated. In one place we ran into the body of a beautiful girl, with her head severed and placed in her arms. In another, the body of a graceful, blond little girl, no more than seven or eight years old, bare-legged, in just a shift. The girl obviously had been crying, pressing her face against the earth, and she remained in that position, pinned to the earth by an asker's [Turkish soldier's] bayonet.

Historian John Nikolopoulos commented on Frunze's eyewitness testimony:

Frunze's diary is a treat beyond his faithful depiction of Turkish efforts to rationalize the on-going genocide and his own Bolshevik view of the conflict as a result of the cynical manipulation of the naive and unsuspecting agriculture population by Western powers. What stands out irrepressibly is Frunze's masterful eyewitness reporting. And it soon becomes apparent, in the course of the narrative, that the internal contradictions between his perceptions and the rationalizations he conscientiously attempts to articulate can only be resolved in one way – direct action in favor of the victims.

=== Frunze as an attempted rescuer ===
During and after witnessing Turkish atrocities, Frunze sought to act as a rescuer towards Greek victims. On the road from Havza, Frunze briefly halted a march of exhausted and starving Greek prisoners, during which his military escort ordered the guards not to mistreat them. Afterwards, upon arriving in Samsun and after witnessing dozens of mutilated bodies along the road, Frunze ignored diplomatic amenities and, in what he described as a "very cold and tense" conversation, immediately confronted the local Turkish authority, the mutasarrif, about the massacres. Frunze demanded that the mutasarrif immediately investigates the behavior of his Turkish military convoy and issue strict instructions to the authorities to, at least, protect the people being forced into deportation.

Semyon Aralov, an eyewitness himself, commented on the events in 1960 and noted that, while both he and Frunze witnessed Turkish atrocities against Greeks, both had a limited ability to intervene. He wrote: "[We encountered] the bodies of massacred Greeks whom they had abducted from their homes and killed on the roads. I told him [Mustafa Kemal] about the horrific massacres of the Greeks that Frunze had seen, and later I myself [witnessed]. Bearing in mind Lenin's advice not to offend Turkish national pride, I had to choose my words very carefully...".

== Death ==
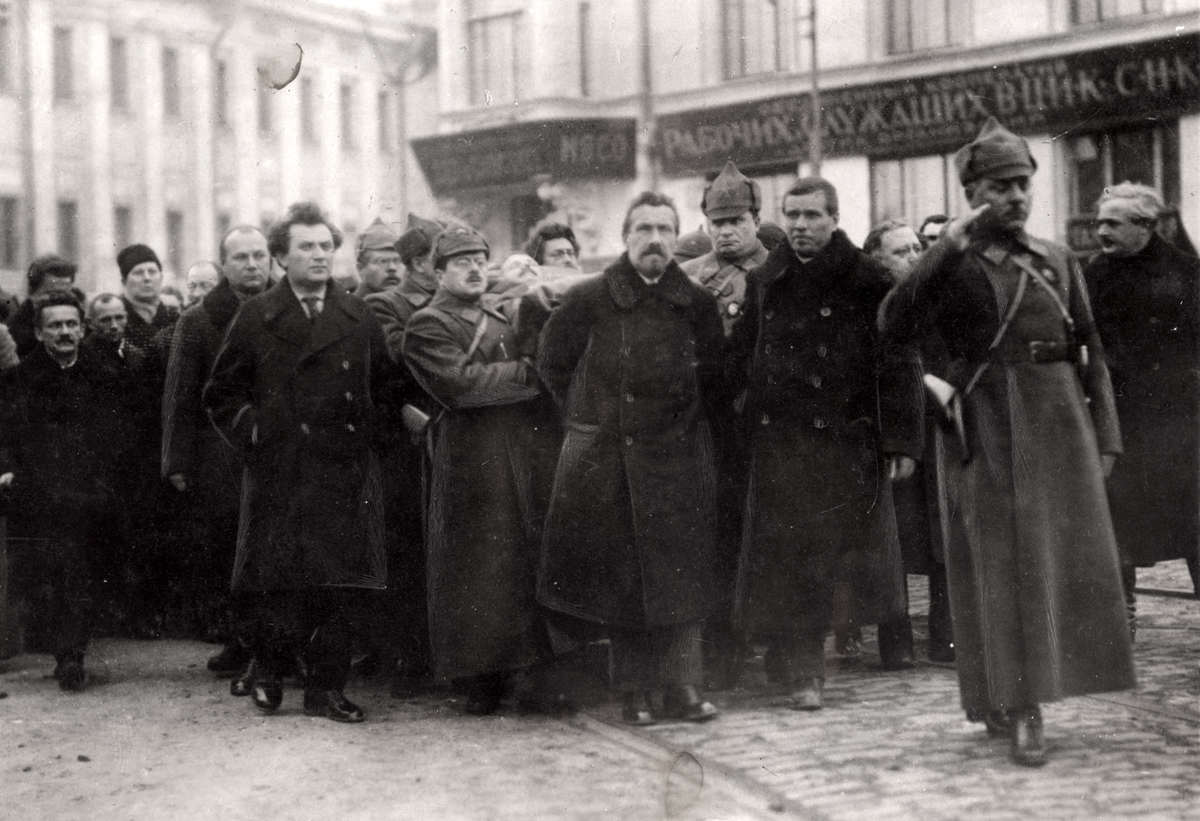
Frunze's funeral, November 3, 1925

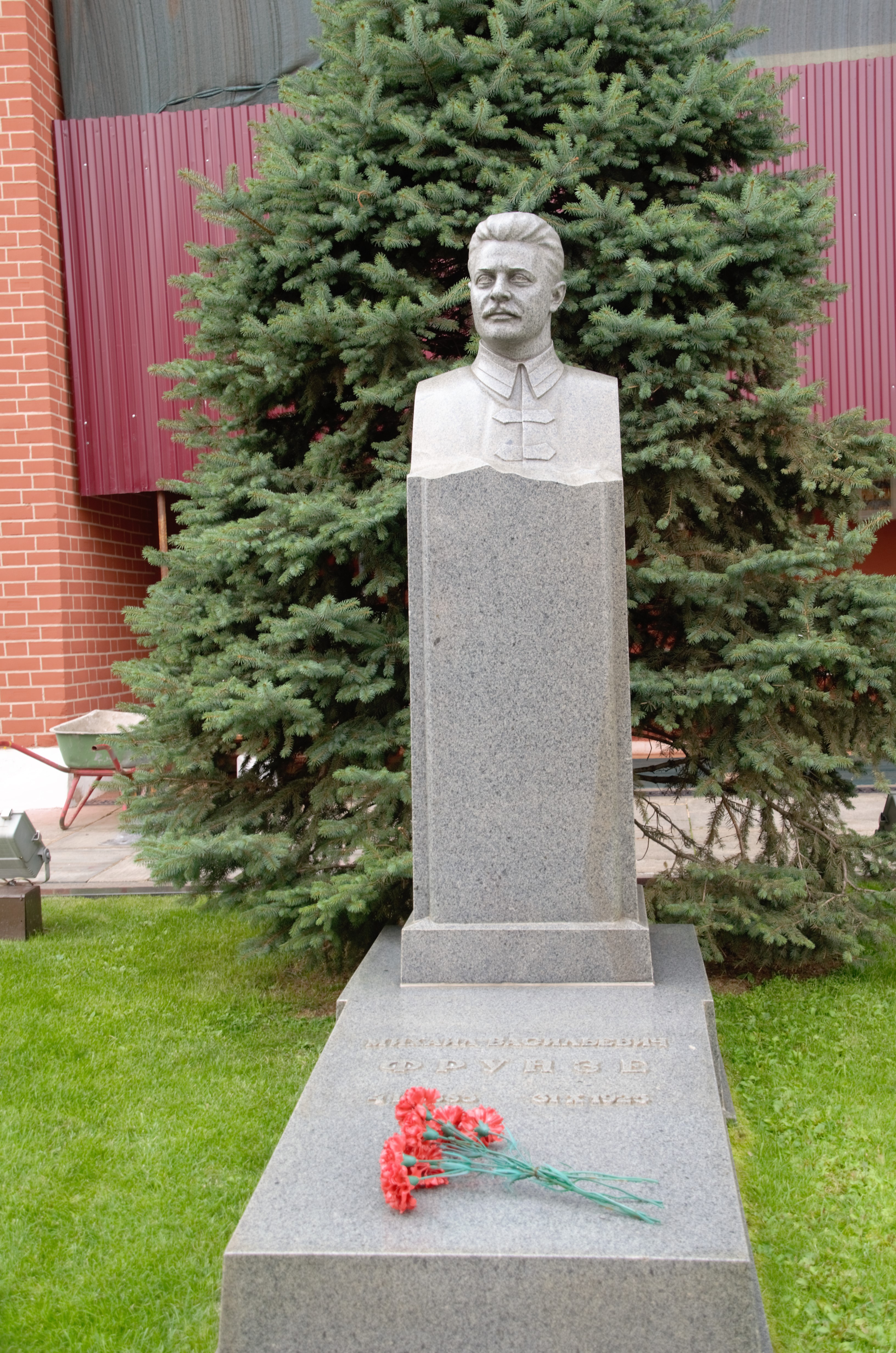
Frunze's tomb in the Kremlin Wall Necropolis

Frunze had been noted among communist leaders as possessing a very creative and almost unorthodox view on matters of implementation and policy. He gained the respect and admiration of his comrades thanks to his successful pursuit of complicated military objectives, and his endurance during the period when the Communist party was illegal. He had been considered as a potential successor to Lenin, due to his strength in both theoretical and practical matters of advancing the Communist party agenda, and his seeming lack of personal ambition separate from the party.

Frunze suffered from a chronic ulcer. Although doctors recommended surgery, he favoured more conservative treatments. After an especially severe episode in 1925, Frunze was hospitalised. Stalin and Anastas Mikoyan both came to visit him, and impressed on him the need for an operation.

Not long before his death, Frunze wrote to his wife: "At present I am feeling absolutely healthy, and it seems ridiculous to even think of, and even more-so to undergo an operation. Nevertheless, both party representatives are requiring it."

Frunze died during surgery on 31 October 1925. Given the internecine politics, there were rumours that Stalin had secretly ordered his death. Dr Ochkin administered a multiple overdose of ether and chloroform to Frunze, apparently on Stalin's instructions. Several historians have attributed his death to chloroform poisoning, in which the surgery had been arranged by Stalin.

Historian Roman Brackman argued that Frunze had refused to support Stalin in his conflict with his political opposition. Brackman also noted that Stalin was in charge of supervising the medical care of senior Soviet officials and ignored warnings from Frunze's physician that the administration of chloroform would be fatal for Frunze.

Similarly, Trotskyist historian Vadim Rogovin wrote that Stalin ordered the consultation of specially chosen doctors, who recommended surgical intervention. Rogovin explained that this decision was made in spite of the fact that previous doctors had refused to recommend an operation because Frunze may not have been able to withstand chloroform due to his weak heart. Rogovin also cited the memoirs of Anna Larina which referenced the testimony of Frunze's mother who believed that Stalin removed Frunze because he "had acknowledged Trotsky's authority until very recently and treated him with great respect". Boris Bazhanov, Stalin's secretary, suggested that Stalin had Frunze poisoned and "had an infinite number of ways to poison Trotsky" before proceeding to bury him in Red Square "with pomp and ceremonious speeches".

A 26 October 2010 article in Izvestiya reported that Frunze had been administered a chloroform dose that exceeded the normal dose by sevenfold.

Frunze was buried in the Kremlin Wall Necropolis. Today his grave is one of the twelve individual tombs located between the Lenin Mausoleum and the Kremlin Wall.

== Legacy ==
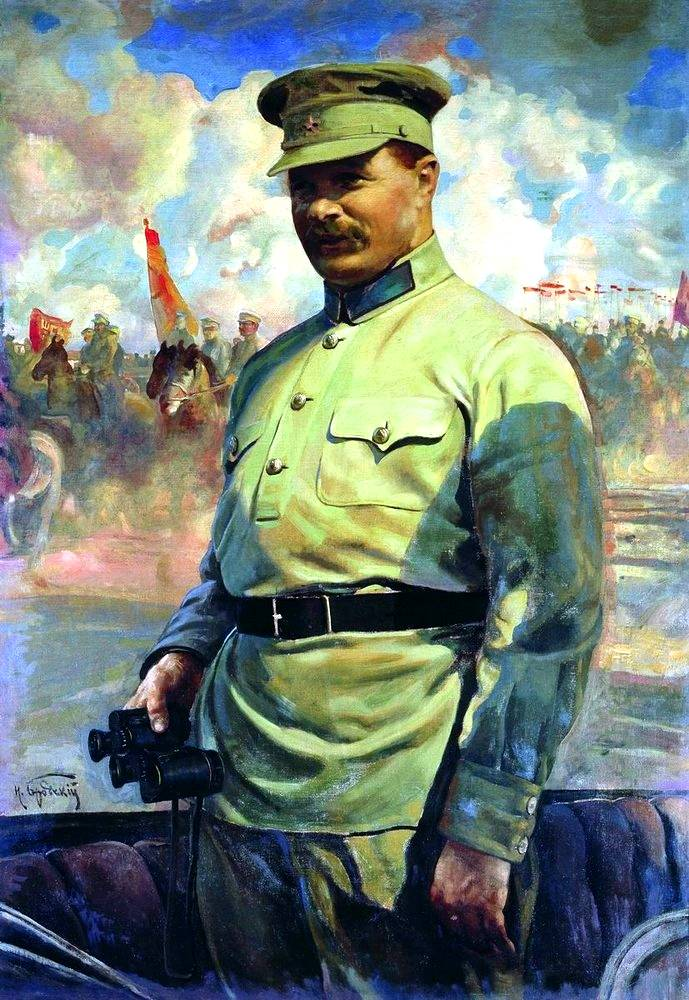
Frunze by Isaak Brodsky.

In 1926, the capital city of Bishkek, Kyrgyzstan, was renamed Frunze in his honour. It reverted to its former name in 1991, after dissolution of the Soviet Union. IATA code for Bishkek's Manas International Airport continued to be FRU, standing for the city's longtime name, for another 34 years before it was changed to BSZ in 2025.

Frunze is still commemorated in his native city: his equestrian statue stands in front of the main railway station. A street and a museum in the centre of the city are named after him. In addition, the museum contains his childhood home, a cottage that was installed inside a larger modern structure.

Shuya, Ivanovo Oblast is home to another memorial museum dedicated to Frunze.

Multiple villages in Russia were named for him. Streets in many Russian cities are named after him.

The Frunze Military Academy in Moscow, one of the most respected in the former Soviet Union, was named in his honour.

The Soviet 2nd Rifle Division was formerly known as 2nd Belarusian Red Banner Rifle Division in the name of M.V. Frunze.

There are stations named Frunzenskaya in his honour on the Moscow Metro, Saint Petersburg Metro and Minsk Metro, and a stone carving of his likeness stands at one end of the station.

The Nemyshlyanskyi District of Kharkiv, Ukraine, was formerly named Frunzensky District. In 2016 it was renamed to its current name to comply with decommunization laws.

After his death, the first name for boys Frunzik (roughly "Little Frunze") became quite popular in the Caucasus and Soviet Turkestan. The most notable of these is probably Frunzik Mkrtchyan.

The Russian battleship Poltava was renamed Frunze in his honour in January 1926, as was the second Kirov-class nuclear battlecruiser (now the "Admiral Lazarev") in 1981. The Leninets-class submarine L-3, launched in 1931, was named Frunzenets ("Frunzeist", follower of Frunze) after him.

General Frunze is also honoured with a place right behind Atatürk, in the Monument of the Republic, located at the heart of Taksim Square, in Istanbul, Turkey.

Frunze is remembered by some for his military doctrine. One author even ranks him next to Clausewitz.

== Literary depictions ==
Boris Pilnyak's story "The Tale of the Unextinguished Moon" was based on Frunze's death. His death also forms the central element of the first two chapters of Vasily Aksyonov's novel Generations of Winter.

Marxist activist Tariq Ali featured Frunze in his 2017 biography of Vladimir Lenin, The Dilemmas of Lenin. Ali portrays Frunze as a significant figure in developing the military tactics of the Red Army during the civil war. He emphasizes Frunze's concept of Marxist military tactics, which strongly influenced Soviet military organization.

== Quotes ==
- "All that we do, every action, should correspond to the highest ideals of the Revolution."
- "The Red Army was created by the workers and peasants and is led by the will of the working class. That will is being carried out by the united Communist Party."

== See also ==
- Outline of the Russian Revolution and Civil War
- Bibliography of the Russian Revolution and Civil War
- Bibliography of Stalinism and the Soviet Union
- Index of Old Bolsheviks
- Index of articles related to the Russian Revolution and Civil War

Military offices
Preceded by Pavel Lebedev	Chief of the Staff of the Red Army; April 1924 – January 1925	Succeeded by Sergey Kamenev
Preceded by Leon Trotsky	People's Commissar for Army and Navy Affairs; 15 January–31 October 1925	Succeeded by Kliment Voroshilov
