= Rough Music =

Rough music is a folk custom of mock serenading.

Rough music may also refer to:

- Rough Music: Blair, Bombs, Baghdad, London, Terror, a 2005 book by Tariq Ali
- Rough Music (album), a 1995 album by the Blue Aeroplanes
