= Tatyana Frunze =

Russian chemist (1920–2024)

- Татьяна Фрунзе
- Frunze in 2020
- Born: 2 August 1920; Tashkent, Turkestan ASSR, Russian SFSR
- Died: 15 January 2024 (aged 103); Moscow, Russia
- Education: MUCTR
- Spouse: Anatoly Pavlov
- Children: 2
- Relatives: Timur Frunze (brother)
- Scientific career
- Workplaces: N. D. Zelinsky Institute of Organic Chemistry, Nesmeyanov Institute of Organoelement Compounds

Tatyana Mikhailovna Frunze (Russian: Татьяна Михайловна Фрунзе; 2 August 1920 – 15 January 2024) was a Soviet and Russian organic chemist, Doctor of Chemical Sciences, professor (1969). She was the daughter of Mikhail Frunze.

== Early life and career ==
Frunze was born into the family of People's Commissar of Military and Naval Affairs Mikhail Frunze. After the death of her father (1925) and mother (1926), together with her younger brother Timur, she lived with her grandmother for some time, and after her death, the children were adopted by family friend Klim Voroshilov.

According to the memoirs of Semyon Budyonny, she studied at the Military Academy of Chemical Defense of the Red Army, and during the war she worked at one of the tank factories. As of 10 October 1945, she served at the academy with the rank of lieutenant technician.

In 1947 she graduated from the Moscow University of Chemical Technology (graduate of the Department of Chemistry and Technology of Organic Synthesis). Then she worked at the N. D. Zelinsky Institute of Organic Chemistry, carried out research on the chemistry of polyamides, and defended her Candidate of Sciences thesis on this topic.

In 1954, she moved to the newly founded Institute of Organoelement Compounds, and a few years later she defended her doctoral dissertation on the topic “Research in the field of synthetic heterochain polyamides.” (Исследование в области синтетических гетероцепных полиамидов). In 1964, she headed the newly created laboratory of polymerization processes at the institute.

For several years she was a member of the Expert Council of the Higher Attestation Commission on Organic Chemistry and a member of the Council on Macromolecular Compounds under the Presidium of the USSR Academy of Sciences.

In addition to scientific work, she was engaged in social work: from 1968 to 1991 she was deputy chairman of the Committee of Soviet Women. She also took part in preserving the legacy of M. V. Frunze.

== Personal life ==
Tatyana Frunze in military uniform

Tatyana Frunze's husband was Colonel General Anatoly Georgievich Pavlov (1920–2007). Son Timur Anatolyevich Pavlov (1944–2008) (named in honor of Tatyana Mikhailovna’s brother) and daughter Elena Anatolyevna Pavlova (born 1948) are also chemical scientists. She also has grandchildren and great-grandchildren.

In December 2008, Tatyana Frunze’s apartment was robbed, including Mikhail Frunze’s awards. The thieves who had gained the trust of Tatyana Frunze were found, and a number of valuables were returned.

As of April 2020, she lived in Moscow with her daughter Elena. In August 2020, she celebrated her 100th birthday.

Frunze died in Moscow on 15 January 2024, at the age of 103.

== Awards ==
- Order of the Red Banner of Labor
- Order of Friendship of Peoples (16 January 1981)
- Order of the Badge of Honour (30 December 1990)
- Medal "For the victory over Germany in the Great Patriotic War of 1941–1945" (1945)
- Medal "Nairamdal" (Friendship) (Mongolian People's Republic)
- other medals.

== Scientific research ==
Frunze's scientific interests were related to the chemistry of macromolecular compounds. She studied polycondensation reactions, in particular those occurring during the synthesis of polyamides, together with her colleagues she obtained many new polyamides (for example, caprolite and declon) and, based on a study of the dependence of the properties of these compounds on their structure, proposed a concept that allows these properties to be changed as needed. In addition, she studied the polymerization of vinyl compounds and heterocycles.

Author of the monograph “Synthetic heterochain polyamides” (1962, together with Vasiliy Korshak), a large number of scientific papers, and several inventions.
