= Masters of the Universe? NATO's Balkan Crusade =

2000 book edited by Tariq Ali

- Author: Tariq Ali (editor)
- Language: English
- Subject: NATO bombing of Yugoslavia
- Publisher: Verso Books
- Publication date: 2000
- Publication place: United Kingdom
- Media type: Print
- Pages: 240

Masters of the Universe? NATO's Balkan Crusade is a 2000 anthology of texts critical of the NATO bombing of Yugoslavia during the Kosovo War, edited by Tariq Ali.

== Summary ==
The texts in Masters of the Universe? NATO's Balkan Crusade question the legitimacy of the NATO bombing of Yugoslavia during the Kosovo War and criticise the people who promoted it as a humanitarian intervention, such as Tony Blair and Jürgen Habermas.

The book contains an introduction with the title "After the War" by the editor Tariq Ali and the following texts:

Part I. How to Rule the World: Geopolitics after the Cold War

- "The Euro-Atlantic Origins of NATO's Attack on Yugoslavia" by Peter Gowan
- "The Balkan War and US Global Power" by Giovanni Arrighi
- "Rasputin Plays at Chess: How the West Blundered into a New Cold War" by Gilbert Achcar
- "The Strategic Triad: USA, China, Russia" by Gilbert Achcar

Part II. On 'Humanitarian Warfare'

- "Humanitarian War: Making the Crime fit the Punishment" by Diana Johnstone
- "In Place of Politics: Humanitarianism and War" by Robert Redeker
- "The Ideology of Humanitarian Intervention" by Alex Callinicos
- "Kosovo and the New Imperialism by Ellen Meiksins Wood

Part III. Balkan Landscapes: the Sleep of Reason

- "War: Building States from Nations" by Susan L. Woodward
- "Bosnia: Prototype of a NATO Protectorate" by David Chandler
- "The Criminalization of Albania" by Michel Chossudovsky

Part IV. Dispatches from the Time of War

- "Open Letter from a Traveller to the President of the Republic" by Régis Debray
- "The NATO Action in Serbia" by Harold Pinter
- "Be More Careful with the Balkans!" by Yevgeny Yevtushenko
- "The Treason of the Intellectuals" by Edward Said
- "NATO's Balkan Crusade" by Tariq Ali
- "Kosovo: the War of NATO Expansion" by Robin Blackburn
- "May Day Speech at Saarbrücken" by Oskar Lafontaine
- "The Kosovo Peace Accord" by Noam Chomsky
- "The China Card" by John Gittings
- "War in Kosovo: Consequences and Lessons for European Security Arrangements" by Dieter S. Lutz

Part V. The Last Word

- "'Traitors' of All Balkan Lands: Unite!" by Gazi Kaplan

== Reception ==
Victoria Brittain of The Guardian says the book "will make numerous powerful men in western chancelleries exceedingly cross", as its authors "take on just about everyone involved in the promotion of NATO's first war". In Medicine, Conflict and Survival, Rae Street calls the book "deeply engaging" and "a treasure-trove of arguments and information", praising its authors' "stimulating writing" and willingness to ignore appeals from politicians and journalists to "the values of the western world". Carl G. Jacobsen describes the book in Global Dialogue as "a powerful, compelling antidote" to apologias for NATO's intervention and the hegemony of the United States over Europe. Gregory Elich writes in Science & Society that the book contains little analysis of the war itself, but works as background reading about the lead-up to the war, American domination of Western Europe and NATO's decision to expand into Eastern Europe.
