= Shadows of the Pomegranate Tree =

1992 novel by Tariq Ali

- First edition
- Author: Tariq Ali
- Series: The Islam Quintet
- Genre: Historical Fiction
- Publisher: Chatto & Windus
- Publication date: 1992
- Media type: Print (hardback & paperback)
- Pages: 240
- ISBN: 0-86091-676-6
- OCLC: 893016859
- LC Class: PR6051.L44 S48 1993
- Preceded by: Redemption
- Followed by: Necklaces

Shadows of the Pomegranate Tree is a historical novel by British Pakistani writer Tariq Ali, first published in 1992. The first of Ali's Islam quintet, a series of historical novels about the confrontations between Islamic and Christian cultures, this novel is set shortly after the reconquista of Kingdom of Granada in Muslim Iberia by the army of Ferdinand and Isabella in the late fifteenth century.

== Plot ==
Beginning with the bonfire of over one hundred thousand books taken from all of the Muslim libraries in Granada, a seat of great learning in Al-Andalus, the story focuses on one family, the Banu Hudayl, who have lived in a small village near Granada for hundreds of years. As rumours begin to circulate of humiliations and possible banishments of Muslims by the conquering Christians, and even forced conversions to Christianity the Banu Hudayl and their fellow villagers, Muslim, Christian and Jew, can only wait in anguish for the approaching disaster.

== Themes ==
=== Loss of culture and identity ===
After witnessing a 'wall of fire,' in which books and records of Al-Andalus had been burned and lost forever, Muslims in Iberia are in a constant state of distress, not only from their Christian opposers, but also in question as to what will become of their future. The seizure of lands and communities cultivated by Muslims for over 600 years, who were natives of Iberia, causes an internal strife among Andalusians as to whether they should resist or lose not only their religion, but also their way of life. This would include the cessation of Islamic prayer, purification, and even speaking Arabic.

=== Tolerance versus extremism ===
Throughout the novel, the residents of the final stronghold of Granada are trapped by oncoming attacks by Christians who would not accept them due to their religious and cultural affiliations. Efforts are made by Umar and Zuhayr, who seek to protect their final holdings of southern Iberia, but find themselves unable to reach a solution with their Christian rivals due to Ximenes' extremist view toward Christianity. Ubaydallah makes a final plea to the Christians to prevent further violence, and in exchange, he offered to convince the entire village to accept Christianity. This plea was ultimately rejected and was met with raids on Banu Hudayl, highlighting that the conflict between Al-Andalus and the Christians was never about religious differences, but rather of culture, in which remains of Al-Andalus was essentially erased.

== Historical accuracy ==
Towards the end of Chapter 12, Yazid ate a salad of "radishes, onions, and tomatoes". However, the tomato originated in western South America and Central America It would not have been available in the Granada area at the time of the story.
