= Gilbert Achcar =

Lebanese socialist academic and writer

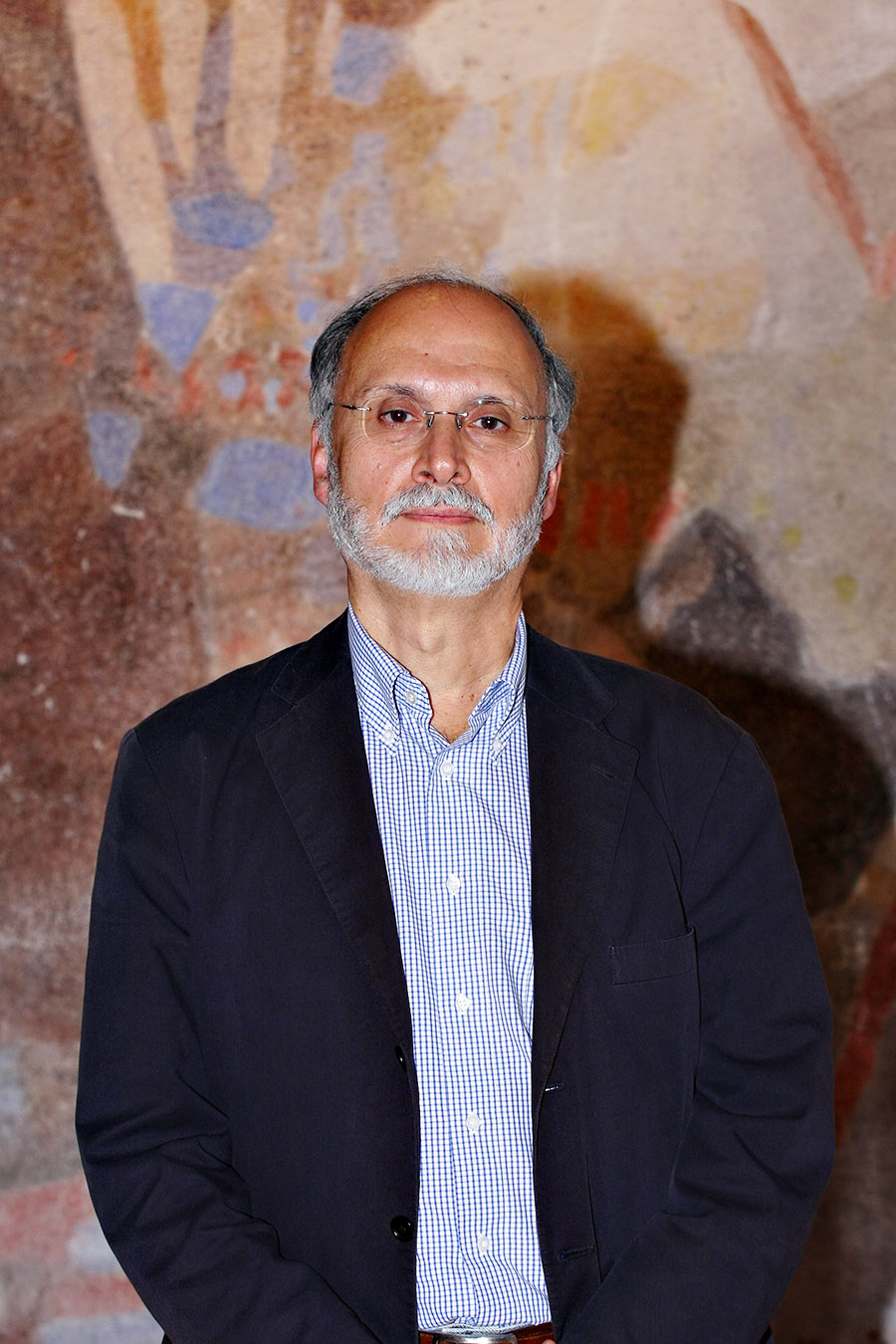
- Achcar in ABF-huset in Stockholm, Sweden.
- Born: 5 November 1951 (age 74); Senegal, French West Africa
- Scientific career
- Fields: Academic, writer

Gilbert Achcar (Arabic: جلبير الأشقر; born 5 November 1951) is a Lebanese socialist academic and writer.

His research interests cover the Near East and North Africa, the foreign policy of the United States, globalization, Islam, and Islamic fundamentalism.

== Career ==
Born in Senegal, Achcar was raised in Lebanon, where he obtained degrees in philosophy and the social sciences at Lebanese University and was a member of the Revolutionary Communist Group.

== The Arabs and the Holocaust ==
Achcar's The Arabs and the Holocaust, published in 2010, analyses the collaboration between Arab leaders and the Nazis and the impact of those relationships on modern Arab-Israeli relationships. According to Tariq Ali, it dismantles in a scholarly way what he calls the "simplistic myths" that emerged in the wake of the establishment of the State of Israel. In the book, Achcar argues that it is ironic Israel preferred to deal with a "notorious Jew-hater" like Anwar Sadat, who regarded Jews as a "treacherous people", instead of Gamal Abdel Nasser, and it preferred Mahmoud Abbas to Yasser Arafat, though aware of the former's remarks on the Holocaust, and he questions:

Is it an accident that Israel's rulers chose to sign treaties with Anwar Sadat rather than Nasser, and preferred Abbas over Arafat? Or is it a sign of elective affinities between Jew haters and Arab haters, whose vision of the world is the same, only stood on its head?

"Statist Zionism is a Janus," Achcar adds, with "one face towards the Holocaust, the other toward the Nakba," in that it faces not only the persecutions suffered in the Holocaust but also the subsequent oppression it has inflicted on Palestinians. Achcar concludes that genuine dialogue can only arise if both realities are confronted.

According to Tony Greenstein, writing in Holy Land Studies, the book is "based on a considerable body of research" and its strongest point is its treatment of the understanding of the Holocaust in Arab society. Greenstein argues that Achcar sometimes engages in special pleading in favour of Zionism. In Race & Class, Ralph M. Coury describes the book as magisterial in its "ability to integrate a story of Arab intellectual and political diversity with the story of how this diversity has often been reduced to a monolithic caricature", but he suggests that the author may overstate the role of narratives. Anaheed Al-Hardan, in British Journal of Middle Eastern Studies, described the book as "a powerful and nuanced indictment of what is an essentialising and demonising discourse on the Arabs and the Holocaust".

The Arabs and the Holocaust was reviewed unfavorably by Jeffrey Herf, who wrote in The New Republic that the book undermines its virtues with "superficial, unfair, and unreliable readings of those with whom he disagrees" and that such attacks do not contribute to scholarship. Matthias Küntzel of the Canadian Institute for the Study of Antisemitism, described the book as one "in which an author from the political left seeks to protect the dogmas of Western anti-Zionism from the reality of Arab antisemitism." Writing for Mondoweiss, Miriyam Aouragh reviewed it positively, calling it "a reasoned intervention that at once disputes anti-Arab racism and develops a strong set of arguments against the notion 'Arab anti-Semitism'."

== Other views ==
In the Scottish Left Review, Achcar advocated for supplying weapons to Ukraine amidst Russia's invasion of the country, writing,

[T]hose who advocate 'peace' while opposing the Ukrainians' right to acquire weapons for their defence are counterposing peace to fighting. In other words, they are wishing for the capitulation of Ukraine – for which 'peace' could have resulted if the Ukrainians had not been armed and hence not been able to defend their country?

In December 2022, Achcar proposed pressuring China to coerce Russia into stopping the invasion. Activist Jean Vogel criticized Achcar, arguing that China's involvement would compromise Ukraine's political independence.

== Bibliography ==
- Author: La nouvelle Guerre froide : le monde après le Kosovo, 1999. English translation included as two chapters in Tariq Ali (ed.): Masters of the Universe? NATO's Balkan Crusade, 2000.
- Editor: The Legacy of Ernest Mandel, 1999.
- Author: Eastern Cauldron: Islam, Afghanistan, Palestine and Iraq in a Marxist Mirror, 2004 (L'Orient incandescent : le Moyen-Orient au miroir marxiste, 2003.
- Author The Clash of Barbarisms: The Making of the New World Disorder (Le choc des barbaries : terrorismes et désordre mondial, 2002 and 2006.
- Editor: The Israeli Dilemma: A Debate between Two Left-Wing Jews. Letters between Marcel Liebman and Ralph Miliband (Le dilemme israélien. Un débat entre Juifs de gauche), 2006.
- Author with Michel Warschawski: The 33-Day War: Israel’s War on Hezbollah in Lebanon and its Consequences, 2007.
- Author with Noam Chomsky, Perilous Power. The Middle East and U.S. Foreign Policy,, (2007/2008) rev.ed. Routledge, 2015.
- Author: The Arabs and the Holocaust, 2010.
- Author: The People Want: A Radical Exploration of the Arab Uprising, (trans.) University of California Press, 2012.
- Author: Marxism, Orientalism, Cosmopolitanism, Haymarket Books, 2013.
- Author: Morbid Symptoms: Relapse in the Arab Uprising, Stanford University Press, 2016.
- Author: The New Cold War: The United States, Russia, and China from Kosovo to Ukraine, Haymarket Books, 2023.
