= The Obama Syndrome =

Book by Tariq Ali

The Obama Syndrome: Surrender at Home, War Abroad
- Cover of the first edition
- Author: Tariq Ali
- Language: English
- Subjects: American politics, Barack Obama, American imperialism
- Published: London
- Publisher: Verso Books
- Publication date: October 2010
- Publication place: United Kingdom
- Media type: Print (hardcover and paperback)
- Pages: 168
- ISBN: 9781844674497

The Obama Syndrome: Surrender at Home, War Abroad is a 2010 book by British-Pakistani writer, journalist, political activist and historian Tariq Ali.

== Synopsis ==
The book, described as "a merciless dissection of Obama's overseas escalation and domestic retreat", is strongly critical of the presidency of Barack Obama. Ali argues little has changed since George W. Bush left office, with appeasement of Israel continuing, genuine domestic reform abandoned, torture and drone strikes continuing and Wall Street being bailed out without reform.

== Reception ==
In The Guardian, Stryker Maguire, editor of LSE Review, wrote "I was prepared to dislike Ali's The Obama Syndrome: Surrender at Home, War Abroad more than I did in the end", and "stripped of its Gore Vidal-school tendentiousness, the book has some reasonable things to say about the Obama presidency", while in the New York Journal of Books, the reviewer wrote "Ali’s progressive stance confronts the illusions sold to voters in 2008 by a compliant media and capitalist firms".
