= The Extreme Centre =

2015 book by Tariq Ali

The Extreme Centre: A Warning
- Cover of the first edition
- Author: Tariq Ali
- Language: English
- Subject: British politics, European politics, capitalism
- Published: London
- Publisher: Verso Books
- Publication date: January 2015
- Publication place: United Kingdom
- Media type: Print
- Pages: 208
- ISBN: 9781784782627

The Extreme Centre: A Warning is a 2015 book by British-Pakistani writer, journalist, political activist, and historian Tariq Ali.

== Synopsis ==
The book is a criticism of the politics of what the author regards as the "indistinguishable political elite" in the United Kingdom and their devotion to capitalism. The book analyses what Ali sees as the failure of the European Union and NATO, political corruption in Westminster and the dominance of the American Empire.

== Reception ==
In the Socialist Review, the book was praised, while in the Financial Times the book was criticised as "conspiratorial" and an "examination of the frustrations of the radical left". Ali was profiled and the book was previewed in The Guardian.
