= The Duel: Pakistan on the Flight Path of American Power =

2008 book by Tariq Ali

- Cover of the first edition
- Author: Tariq Ali
- Language: English
- Subjects: Politics of Pakistan, war on terror, American imperialism
- Published: London
- Publisher: Simon & Schuster, Pocket Books (2009)
- Publication date: 2008
- Publication place: United Kingdom
- Media type: Print (paperback)
- Pages: 315
- ISBN: 9781847393746

The Duel: Pakistan on the Flight Path of American Power is a 2008 book by British-Pakistani writer, journalist, political activist and historian Tariq Ali.

== Synopsis ==
Ali examines Pakistan–United States relations, and is critical of Pakistani subservience to imperialistic American foreign policy and military ambitions. He examines US aid to Pakistan, and the hostile approach of American politicians to Pakistan. He also discusses the failure and corruption of President Pervez Musharraf and the situation in Waziristan and Khyber Pakhtunkhwa.

== Reception ==
In The Independent Salil Tripathi wrote "In The Duel, Ali provides a gossip-filled, witty and polemical history, revealing, with perspicacity and verve, the flight into the abyss" and "Ali recounts, with anguish and anger, how the generals who ruled Pakistan for 34 of its 60 years boosted defence budgets, starving development of resources". In a Peace News review, Milan Rai described the book as "a highly timely, well-informed, readable, sometimes-not-very-chronological study of Pakistan's political evolution".
