= Bush in Babylon =

2003 Non-fiction book

- Genre: Non-fiction
- Publisher: Verso Books
- Publication date: 2003
- ISBN: 1-85984-583-5

Bush in Babylon: The Recolonisation of Iraq is a book by the historian Tariq Ali that attacks the 2003 invasion of Iraq. The book comprises two parts, the first being a modern history of Iraq, the second a condemnation of the 2003 invasion. Ali uses poetry and critical essays to express his ideas.
