= The Dilemmas of Lenin =

2017 Biography of V. Lenin by Tariq Ali

The Dilemmas of Lenin: Terrorism, War, Empire, Love, Revolution
- Author: Tariq Ali
- Subject: Nonfiction
- Publisher: Verso Books
- Publication date: 2017
- Media type: Print
- Pages: 384pp

The Dilemmas of Lenin: Terrorism, War, Empire, Love, Revolution is a 2017 book written by activist and Trotskyist Tariq Ali, which focuses on the life of Russian Bolshevik revolutionary Vladimir Lenin.

== Synopsis ==
Tariq Ali provides a biography of Vladimir Lenin from a Trotskyist perspective. Ali introduces the work by describing the historical subjugation of Russian working-class, peasants, through a system of Autocratic Tsarist regime, the conservative Russian Orthodox Church, and the upper-class. Marxism and socialism had a decisive appeal for Russian dissidents, the underprivileged and revolutionaries. Prominent Russian socialist thought developed in the form of the Anarchism with Mikhail Bakunin and Peter Kropotkin, Tolstoyian Christianity, Russian Liberalism, and Marxist philosopher Plekhanov. Tariq broadens this image of Russian to the international appeal of Socialism and Marxism during this period of time, using the example of the historical popularity of socialism in The United States in the form of Eugene V. Debs and Emma Goldman.

== Reception ==
Daniel Beer of The Guardian gave the book a mixed review, while praising Ali for his sympathetic portrayal of Lenin within context of the political climate of Tsarist Russia, while criticizing him for withholding criticism of many of Lenin's authoritarian and unethical actions during the Russian Civil War and as leader of The Soviet Union. Likewise, Sheila McGregor of The Socialist Review gave a positive review of the work, while noting that the work seems to have inconsistent themes. JP O’ Malley writing in The American Conservative found aspects of Ali's work interesting, but that it was a "scattered affair" due to "interjects of banal Marxist slogans into his work when he runs out of ideas." and "As a committed Leninist, Ali views the world through a one-dimensional, black-and-white lens. There is right and wrong and the real truth. The real truth is Marxism. There isn’t much nuance here, and Ali seems to regard ideological opponents as traitors, hypocrites, and philistines."
