= Diana Johnstone =

American political writer (1934–2026)

- Born: June 23, 1934
- Died: November 15, 2026 (aged 92)
- Education: University of Minnesota (BA, PhD)
- Occupations: Writer; Author
- Employer: In These Times (1979–1990)
- Notable work: Fools' Crusade; Queen of Chaos

Diana Johnstone (June 23, 1934 – November 15, 2026) was an American political writer based in Paris. She focused principally on European politics and Western foreign policy.

== Early life ==
Johnstone was born on June 23, 1934. She gained a BA in Russian Area Studies and a PhD in French Literature from the University of Minnesota. She was active in the movement against the Vietnam War, organizing the first international contacts between American citizens and Vietnamese representatives. Most of Johnstone's adult life has been spent in France, Germany, and Italy.

She was European editor of the U.S. weekly In These Times from 1979 to 1990. She was press officer of the Green group in the European Parliament from 1990 to 1996.

== Fool's Crusade ==
After the 2003 publication of her Fools' Crusade: Yugoslavia, Nato, and Western Delusions, Johnstone became known for her claim in the book that there is "no evidence whatsoever" that the Srebrenica massacre of the Bosniaks was genocidal. The historian Marko Attila Hoare called it "an extremely poor book, one that is little more than a polemic in defence of the Serb-nationalist record during the wars of the 1990s—and an ill-informed one at that".

The book was rejected by publishers in Sweden, prompting an open letter in 2003 defending Johnstone's book—and her right to publish—that was signed by, among others, Noam Chomsky, Arundhati Roy, Tariq Ali and John Pilger. The signatories stated: "We regard Diana Johnstone's Fools' Crusade as an outstanding work, dissenting from the mainstream view but doing so by an appeal to fact and reason, in a great tradition." Ed Vulliamy, who reported for The Guardian during the Bosnian War, called Johnstone's book "poison" finding the response of Chomsky and the others unbelievable. In March 2006, David Aaronovitch in The Times wrote: "In the sense that the world understood there to have been an act amounting to genocide at Srebrenica ... Johnstone certainly, and Chomsky implicitly, had most certainly denied the massacre". In the book "and elsewhere she had argued that the numbers of deaths had been exaggerated, that many supposed victims were in fact still alive somewhere, that Srebrenica had actually been an armed camp, that the Bosnians had deliberately let it be overrun hoping for a anti-Serb propaganda coup, that there had been some regrettable 'revenge' killings, as can happen in wartime".

In her own defence, Johnstone has said her critics "reduce [her] book, as they reduce the Balkan conflict itself, to a certain number of notorious atrocities, and stigmatise whatever deviates from their own dualistic interpretation".

Richard Caplan of Reading and Oxford University reviewed the work in International Affairs, where he described the work as "a revisionist and highly contentious account of western policy and the dissolution of Yugoslavia. ... [It] is insightful but overzealous ... well worth reading—but for the discriminating eye."

== Later writing ==
In April 2012, she wrote for CounterPunch and other publications about the first round of the French presidential elections a few days prior, and identified Front National leader Marine Le Pen as "basically on the left". Describing Johnstone as "an excellent journalist", Alexander Cockburn in The Nation, quoted from an email she had sent to him: "There is absolutely nothing attesting to anti-Semitism on the part of Marine Le Pen. She has actually tried to woo the powerful Jewish organisations, and her anti-Islam stance is also a way to woo such groups. The simple fact is that the best way to destroy someone in this country is to call him or her 'anti-Semitic'."

== Death ==
Johnstone died on November 15, 2026, at the age of 92.

== Bibliography ==
- The Politics of Euromissiles: Europe's Role in America's World (New York, NY: Schocken Books, 1985)
- Fools' Crusade: Yugoslavia, Nato, and Western Delusions (London: Pluto Press; New York: Monthly Review Press, 2003)
- Queen of Chaos: The Misadventures of Hillary Clinton (CounterPunch, 2015)
- From MAD to madness: Inside Pentagon nuclear war planning: A Memoir (Clarity Press, 2017)
- Circle in the Darkness: Memoirs of a World Watcher (Clarity Press, 2020)
- World Watcher: On Manufacturing War (Clarity Press, 2026)
