= Redemption (Ali novel) =

1990 novel by Tariq Ali

- First edition cover
- Author: Tariq Ali
- Language: English
- Publication date: 1990

Redemption, the first novel by author and historian Tariq Ali, is a roman à clef and apostate satire of the inability of Trotskyists to handle the downfall of the Eastern bloc. In the midst of the downfall of the Soviet Union, the self-styled revolutionaries are faced with dwindling numbers in their groups and decide to form a religious movement.

== Plot ==
Ezra Einstein calls an international conference in Paris whose British sections are 'the Hoods' (the WRP), 'the Rockers' (SWP) and 'the Burrowers League' (Militant). Also invited are the 'Proletarian International Socialist Party of American Workers' (PISPAW) (SWP-US) and representatives from the 'New Life Journal' (New Left Review).

Faced with the collapse of world communism, Einstein concludes that the best way forward is to become a religious movement. The new religion would be a synthesis of Freemasonry, Islam and Christianity with the ideas of the PISPAW, the Burrowers and the Rockers. The movement would be called 'Chrislamasonism' and it would hold up "popular saints" such as Hegel.

== Real life figures ==
The protagonist Ezra Einstein is based on Ernest Mandel, a key intellectual figure in the IMG to which Ali belonged in the 1960s and 70s. The novel contains portraits of other well-known figures in the Trotskyist movement including Gerry Healy (Frank Hood), Tony Cliff (Jimmy Rock), Ted Grant (Jed Burroughs), Chris Harman (Nutty Shardman), Paul Foot (Alex Mango), Jack Barnes (Jim Noble), Michel Pablo ('Diablo') and Vanessa Redgrave (Laura Shaw).

Each character is a harsh caricature. Laura Shaw is portrayed as traveling with the embalmed corpse of her political guru, whereas Jim Noble has a thinly veiled god complex. Meanwhile, Alex Mango is characterised as a talented, but lecherous polemicist. "It was said that Alex used to disguise himself as a milkman and service most of North London in a day; but this was probably a vile slander spread with somebody less well endowed with bottle."
