= Rough Music: Blair, Bombs, Baghdad, London, Terror =

2005 nonfiction book by Tariq Ali

- Cover of the first edition
- Author: Tariq Ali
- Language: English
- Subjects: British politics, Iraq War, terrorism
- Published: London
- Publisher: Verso Books
- Publication date: September 2005
- Publication place: United Kingdom
- Media type: Print
- Pages: 104
- ISBN: 9781844675456
- OCLC: 61731307

Rough Music: Blair, Bombs, Baghdad, London, Terror is a 2005 book by British-Pakistani writer, journalist, political activist and historian Tariq Ali.

== Synopsis ==
The book is a reaction to the 7 July 2005 London bombings, which Ali describes as "murderous mayhem that Blair's war has sown in Iraq". The book criticises perceived attacks on civil liberties. He invokes "great dissenters" of the past and calls for "political resistance, within Parliament and without".

== Reception ==
The book was reviewed in the peer-reviewed academic journal Current Issues in Criminal Justice and Arena magazine.
