= Timur Frunze =

Soviet fighter pilot during World War II

- Тимур Фрунзе
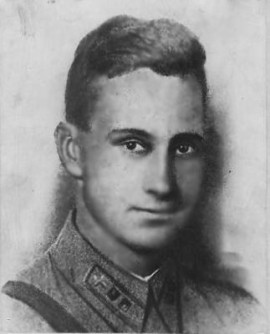
- Born: 5 April 1923; Kharkov, Ukrainian SSR, Soviet Union
- Died: 19 January 1942 (aged 18); Starorussky District, Leningrad Oblast, Russian SFSR, Soviet Union
- Military career
- Allegiance: Soviet Union
- Branch: Soviet Air Forces
- Service years: 1940–1942
- Rank: Lieutenant
- Units: 161st Fighter Aviation Regiment; 57th Mixed Aviation Division
- Conflicts: World War II; Operation Barbarossa; Demyansk Pocket
- Awards: Hero of the Soviet Union (posthumous)

Timur Mikhailovich Frunze (Russian: Тимур Михайлович Фрунзе; 5 April 1923 – 19 January 1942) was a Soviet fighter pilot and posthumous recipient of the title Hero of the Soviet Union. He was the son of Red Army commander and People's Commissar for Military Affairs Mikhail Frunze.

== Early life ==
Frunze was born on 5 April 1923 in Kharkov, Ukrainian SSR (now Kharkiv, Ukraine), to Mikhail and Sophia Frunze. He was named after the founder of Timurid Empire Tamerlane, whose war skills were admired by his father. His father was the revolutionary leader and reformer of the Red Army, who in January 1925 was appointed People's Commissar for Military and Navy Affairs and President of the Military Revolutionary Council. However, he died of surgery in October when Timur was only two years old. Timur's mother Sophia committed suicide in 1926. As a result, both Timur and his sister Tatyana were raised by their grandmother.

Following the death of their grandmother in 1931, Timur and Tatyana were adopted by their father's friend People's Commissar Kliment Voroshilov, who received permission for adoption by a special resolution of the Politburo of the Central Committee of the All-Union Communist Party of Bolsheviks. Voroshilov had no children of his own, and he permanently adopted Timur and Tatyana in 1931. (Note: Adoption was typical of the Soviet leadership at the time. The children of deceased but talented leaders and members of the intelligentsia were adopted into the families of members of the Politburo.)

== Military career ==
In 1938, Frunze became a member of the Komsomol. After graduating from high school, he entered the Kachin Red Banner Military Aviation School named after A.F. Myasnikov. One of his friends in the aviation school was Stepan Mikoyan, the son of Soviet Politburo member Anastas Mikoyan.

=== World War II ===
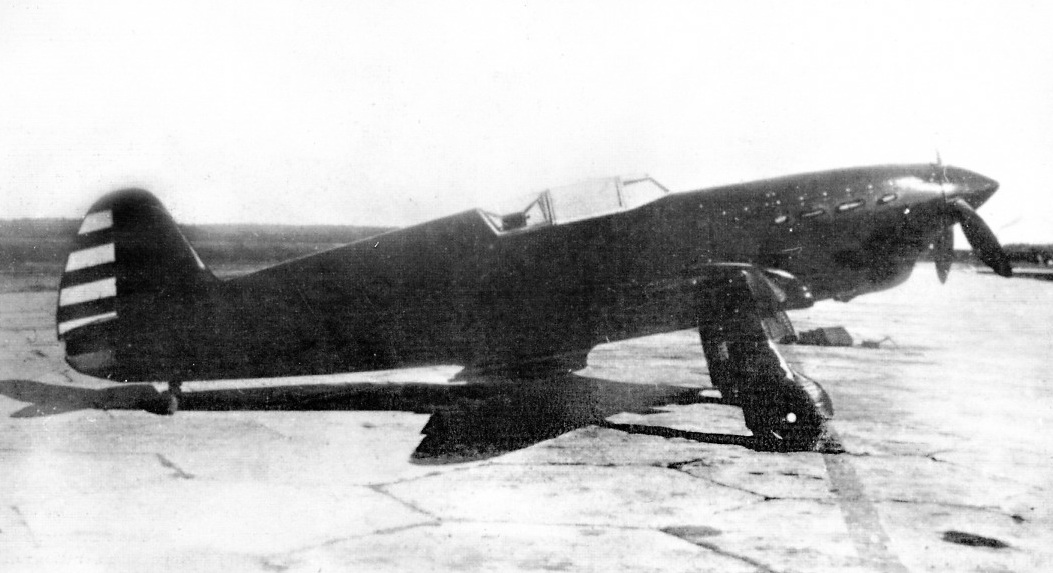
Yakovlev Yak-1

Following the outbreak of Operation Barbarossa in July 1941, many of the children of the Soviet leaders were among the first to volunteer to fight in the front. In December 1941, Frunze was assigned to the 161st Fighter Aviation Regiment, which was equipped with Yakovlev Yak-1s.

From 7 January 1942, the 161st Fighter Aviation Regiment, as part of the 57th Mixed Aviation Division of the Northwestern Front, he participated in the offensive at the Demyansk Pocket. During this time, Frunze flew nine successful sorties to provide air cover for his airfield and ground troops in the area of Staraya Russa. In aerial battles, he was credited with 2 solo and 1 shared aerial shootdowns of enemy aircraft.

On 19 January 1942, while carrying out a combat mission to provide air cover for ground troops, Frunze, together with his flight commander, found 30 German bombers accompanied by eight escort fighters. Deciding to attack, the flight shot down a Henschel Hs 126 spotter aircraft. In the ensuing battle with four Bf 109s and Bf 110s (Note: In the message to the Deputy People's Commissar of the NKVD Vsevolod Merkulov, Voroshilov indicated that it was an 'Me-115', which never existed, that shot down Frunze. Based on examination of combat records, the aircraft that were involved in combat against Soviet pilots were most likely modified versions of Bf 109 and Bf 110.) the flight shot down a Bf 109. Soon three more Bf 110s joined the air battle, and Frunze's flight commander was shot down. Covering the damaged plane of his wingman, Frunze used up all the ammunition and was shot down. His aircraft went into a tailspin and crashed northwest of the village of Otvidino in Starorussky District, killing him.

By the decree of the Presidium of the Supreme Soviet of the USSR on 16 March 1942, Frunze was posthumously awarded the title of Hero of the Soviet Union for "exemplary performance of command missions and for display of courage and heroism".

In his memoirs, Stepan Mikoyan recalled that he last spoke to Frunze over the phone on New Year's Day 1942. The next time Mikoyan heard about him was a few weeks after news of Frunze's death was published. Kliment Voroshilov regretted that he had responded favorably to Frunze's requests to join the front instead of trying to advise him otherwise. He wrote:

"His parents left him in our care, and we betrayed this faith".

Frunze was buried at the Yamskoye Cemetery in the village of Kresttsy. After the end of war, in the 1950s, at the request of his sister Tatyana, he was reburied at the Novodevichy Cemetery in Moscow.

== Awards and honors ==
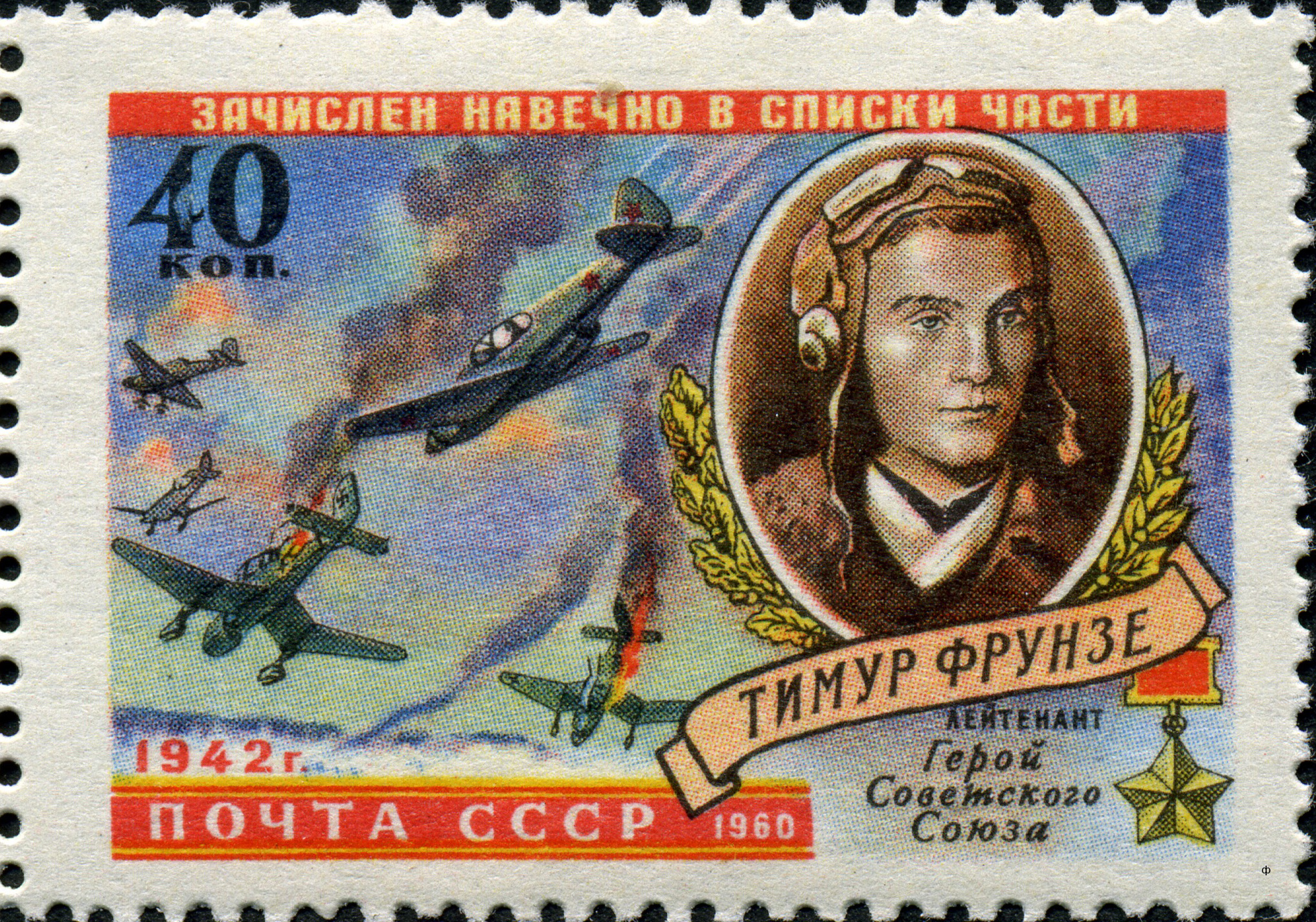
1960 Soviet postal stamp honoring Timur Frunze

- Hero of the Soviet Union (16 March 1942, posthumous)
- Order of Lenin (16 March 1942, posthumous)
- Streets and districts are named after him in Russia (Veliky Novgorod, Kresttsy, Lipetsk, Moscow, Tver, Staraya Russa, Zhukovsky), Kyrgyzstan (Bishkek)
- A memorial plaque honoring him was installed at the former Vladimir Lenin All-Union Pioneer Organization camp in Crimea.
- In the late 1940s, Soviet author Arkady Gaidar's hugely popular children's book Timur and his Team featured a protagonist named Timur who led his friends to protect the empty homes of soldiers on the front from robbers. The character was named in honor of Frunze. The book gave birth to a voluntary movement among the youth, whose members were called “Timurites” (тимуровцы). Frunze, who died young at the beginning of the war, became an admired real-life role model for the Timurites because of his war experience, name and background.
- A monument honoring him is located at the courtyard of the boarding school in Volgograd.

In 2016, Frunzenskyi District in Kharkiv, Ukraine, was renamed to Nemyshlianskyi District, in order to comply with Ukrainian decommunization laws.

== Bibliography ==
- Fitzpatrick, Sheila (2015). On Stalin's Team: The Years of Living Dangerously in Soviet Politics (Hardcover). Princeton University Press. ISBN 978-1400874217.
- Mikoyan, Stepan (1999). Stepan Anastasovich Mikoyan: An Autobiography (Hardcover). Airlife Publishing. ISBN 1853109169.
- Mellinger, George (2012). Yakovlev Aces of World War 2 (Hardcover). Bloomsbury Publishing. ISBN 978-1782005858.
