= Tariq Ali =

British political activist and writer (born 1943)

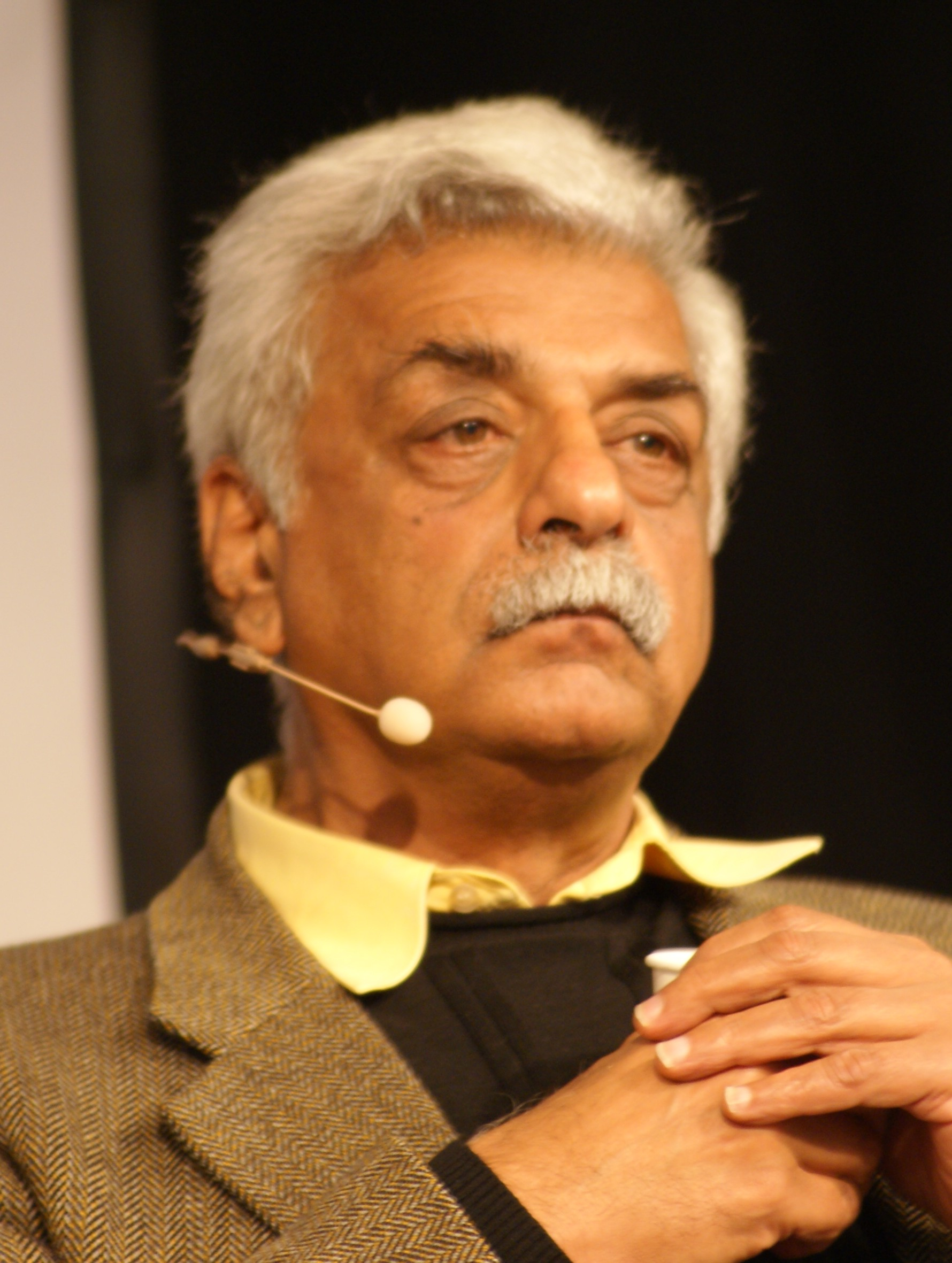
- Ali in 2011
- Born: 21 October 1943 (age 82); Lahore, Punjab, British India
- Education: Exeter College, Oxford, Government College University, Lahore
- Occupations: Political activist Writer; Novelist
- Spouse: Susan Watkins
- Children: 3
- Parent(s): Mazhar Ali Khan and Tahira Mazhar Ali Khan
- Relatives: Sikandar Hayat Khan (maternal grandfather)
- Writing career
- Genres: Geopolitics; History; Marxism; Postcolonialism
- Movement: New Left

Tariq Ali (/ˈtærɪk ˈæli/; Urdu: طارق علی; born 21 October 1943) is a Pakistani-British political activist, writer, journalist, filmmaker, and public intellectual. He is a member of the editorial committee of the New Left Review and Sin Permiso, and contributes to The Guardian, CounterPunch, and the London Review of Books. He read Philosophy, Politics, and Economics at Exeter College, Oxford.

He is the author of many books, including Pakistan: Military Rule or People's Power (1970), Can Pakistan Survive? The Death of a State (1983), Clash of Fundamentalisms: Crusades, Jihads and Modernity (2002), Bush in Babylon (2003), Conversations with Edward Said (2005), Pirates of the Caribbean: Axis Of Hope (2006), The Duel (2008), The Obama Syndrome (2010), and The Extreme Centre: A Warning (2015).

== Early life ==
Ali was born and raised in Lahore, Punjab in British India (later part of Pakistan). He is the son of journalist Mazhar Ali Khan and activist Tahira Mazhar Ali Khan. Ali's mother, Tahira, was the daughter of Sir Sikandar Hyat Khan, who led the Unionist Muslim League and was later Prime Minister of the Punjab from 1937 to 1942. Ali's father, Mazhar, had been "mobilising peasants in his family's fiefdom" when he was invited to join the Pakistan Times by Mian Iftikharuddin, later becoming sympathetic to the Communist cause, although he never joined the party.

Ali's father and mother were cousins. His father served briefly as a Captain in the British Indian Army, because Tahira's father had made service as an army officer a precondition of marriage to her. Tariq's mother later said: "Mazhar left for the Middle East on military service. I was very pregnant by then. We didn't see each other for two years. Our son Tariq was born while Mazhar was away. By the time he returned, I had joined the Communist Party. I had given away my entire trousseau, including the family jewels, to the Party."

=== Emerging activism ===
Ali first became politically active in his teens, taking part in opposition to the military dictatorship of Pakistan. An uncle who worked in the Pakistani military intelligence warned his parents that Ali could not be protected. His parents therefore decided to get him out of Pakistan and sent him to England, where he studied Philosophy, Politics, and Economics at Exeter College, Oxford. At Oxford, he became a member of the Oxford University Humanist Group, where he discovered "that debates and discussions here were far more stimulating than those conducted within the careerist confines of the Labour Club". He was elected President of the Oxford Union in 1965. In 1967 Ali was one of 64 prominent figures, including the Beatles, who signed a petition calling for the legalisation of marijuana. Ali's tenure at the Union included a meeting with Malcolm X in December 1964 during which Malcolm X expressed deep consternation about his own risk of assassination.

== Career ==
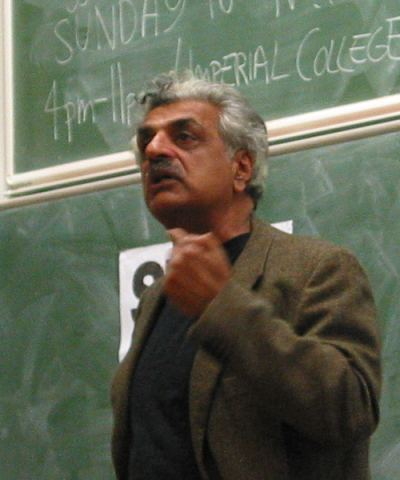
Ali, Imperial College, London, 2003

His public profile began to grow during the Vietnam War, when he engaged in debates against the war with such figures as Henry Kissinger and Michael Stewart. He testified at the Russell Tribunal over US involvement in Vietnam. As time passed, Ali became increasingly critical of American and Israeli foreign policies. He was also a vigorous opponent of American relations with Pakistan that tended to back military dictatorships over democracy. He was one of the marchers on the American embassy in London in 1968 in a demonstration against the Vietnam War.

Active in the New Left of the 1960s, he has long been associated with the New Left Review. Ali inserted himself into politics through his involvement with The Black Dwarf newspaper. In 1968, he joined the International Marxist Group (IMG). He was recruited to the leadership of the IMG and became a member of the International Executive Committee of the (reunified) Fourth International. He also befriended influential figures such as Malcolm X, Stokely Carmichael, John Lennon and Yoko Ono.

In 1967, Ali was in Camiri, Bolivia, not far from where Che Guevara was captured, to observe the trial of Régis Debray. Ali was accused of being a Cuban revolutionary by authorities. Ali then said: "If you torture me the whole night and I can speak Spanish in the morning I'll be grateful to you for the rest of my life."

During this period, he was an IMG candidate in Sheffield Attercliffe at the February 1974 general election and was co-author of Trotsky for Beginners, a cartoon book. In 1981, Ali quit the IMG and joined the Labour Party to support Tony Benn in his bid to become deputy leader of the Labour Party.

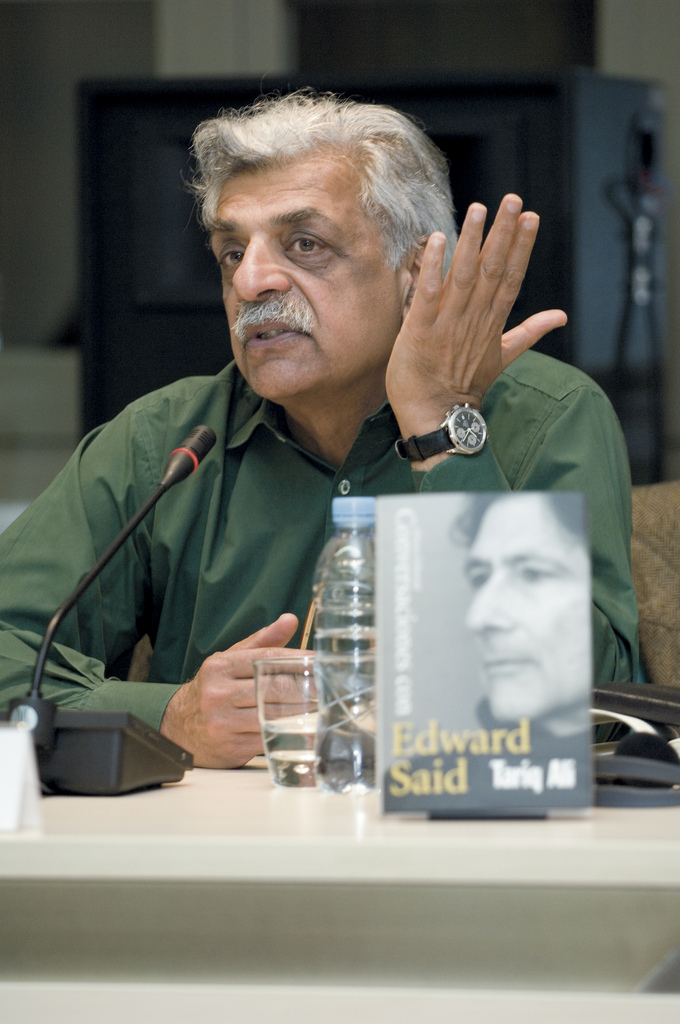
Ali presenting the Spanish version of Conversations with Edward Said, Córdoba, 2010

In 1990, Ali published the satire Redemption, on the inability of the Trotskyists to handle the downfall of the Eastern bloc. The book contains parodies of many well-known figures in the Trotskyist movement. In 1999 Ali strongly criticised NATO intervention in Bosnia and Herzegovina in the piece Springtime for NATO, and book Masters of the Universe? NATO's Balkan Crusade in which he negated the extent and nature of crimes committed by Serbian forces in Bosnia and Kosovo. He defended denialist claims espoused by figures such as Diana Johnstone and Edward S. Herman.

His book, Clash of Fundamentalisms, aimed to put the events of the September 11 attacks in historical perspective. He followed that with Bush in Babylon, which criticised the 2003 invasion of Iraq by American president George W. Bush. The book uses poetry and critical essays in portraying the war in Iraq as a failure. Ali predicted that the new Iraqi government would fail.

Ali has remained a critic of modern neoliberal economics and was present at the 2005 World Social Forum in Porto Alegre, Brazil, where he was one of 19 to sign the Porto Alegre Manifesto. He supports the model of the Bolivarian Revolution in Venezuela.

He has been described as "the alleged inspiration" for the Rolling Stones' song "Street Fighting Man", recorded in 1968. John Lennon's "Power to the People" was inspired by an interview Lennon gave to Ali.

Ali participated in the 2012 Sight & Sound critics' poll, where he listed his ten favourite films as follows: The Battle of Algiers, Charulata, Crimson Gold, The Discreet Charm of the Bourgeoisie, Entranced Earth, If...., Osaka Elegy, The Puppetmaster, Rashomon, and Tout Va Bien.

He has written in favour of Scottish independence.

During the 2016 United Kingdom European Union membership referendum, Ali was sympathetic to a Leave vote on left-wing grounds, whilst simultaneously criticising right-wing support for Brexit based on opposition to immigration.

In 2020, Ali was a member of the Belmarsh Tribunal organised by Progressive International, investigating and evaluating the alleged war crimes committed by the United States government in the 21st century.

In November 2020, a British public inquiry into the work of undercover police officers was provided with evidence that Ali had been spied upon by at least 14 undercover police officers over a period of decades. The surveillance began in 1965 when he became president of the Oxford Union, and continued until at least 2003, when Ali was on the national committee of the Stop the War Coalition trying to prevent the invasion of Iraq. Ali said: "It is incredible to think that after 35 years, in 2003, under the Tony Blair Labour government, that Special Branch were still engaging in the same anti-democratic activity as they had been at the outset."

On 16 February 2022, Ali described warnings of Russian military preparations as "... a highly orchestrated media campaign, trumpeting at top volume the ‘massive’ and ‘imminent’ Russian invasion of Ukraine."

=== Screenplays ===
Tariq Ali's The Leopard and the Fox, first written as a BBC screenplay in 1985, is about the last days of Zulfiqar Ali Bhutto. Never previously produced because of a censorship controversy, it was finally premiered in New York in October 2007, the day before former Pakistani Prime Minister Benazir Bhutto returned to her home country after eight years in exile.

His next screenplay was A Banker for All Seasons (2007), about the rise and fall of the Bank of Credit and Commerce International (BCCI). He completed his trilogy of screenplays with The Assassination: Who Killed Indira G? (2008).

In 2009, Ali co-wrote with Mark Weisbrot the screenplay to the Oliver Stone documentary South of the Border. This gave a favourable account of Hugo Chávez and other left-wing Latin American leaders. Interviewed in the documentary, Ali explained the role that Bolivian water privatisation and the 2000 Cochabamba protests played in eventually bringing Evo Morales to power.

== Personal life ==
Ali lives in Camden, north London, with his partner Susan Watkins, editor of the New Left Review. He has three children. He grew up in a secular family that was more culturally Muslim than religious, and describes himself as an atheist. He published his memoirs in two volumes: Street Fighting Years (1987, later reissued in 2005), and You Can't Please All (2024).

== Selected works ==
- The New Revolutionaries: A Handbook of the International Radical Left (editor), New York: William Morrow and Company, Inc., 1969. Library of Congress Catalog Card Number 79-79860
- Pakistan: Military Rule or People's Power (1970). ISBN 978-0-224-61864-9
- The Coming British Revolution (1971). ISBN 978-0-224-00630-9
- 1968 and After: Inside the Revolution (1978). ISBN 978-0-85634-082-6
- Chile, Lessons of the Coup: Which Way to Workers Power (1978) .ISBN 978-0-85612-107-4
- Trotsky for Beginners (1980). ISBN 978-0-906495-27-8
- Can Pakistan Survive?: The Death of a State (1983). ISBN 978-0-8052-7194-2; (1991) ISBN 978-0-86091-260-6
- Who's Afraid of Margaret Thatcher? In Praise of Socialism (1984). ISBN 978-0-86091-802-8
- The Stalinist Legacy: Its Impact on 20th-Century World Politics (1984). ISBN 978-0-93147-756-0
- An Indian Dynasty: The Story of the Nehru-Gandhi Family (1985). ISBN 978-0-39913-074-8
- Street Fighting Years: An Autobiography of the Sixties (1987). ISBN 978-0-00217-779-5
- Revolution from Above: Soviet Union Now (1988). ISBN 978-0-86091-268-2
- Iranian Nights (1989). ISBN 978-1-85459-026-8
- Moscow Gold (1990). ISBN 978-1-85459-078-7
- Redemption (1990). ISBN 978-0-7011-3394-8
- Shadows of the Pomegranate Tree (1992; 1st in the Islam Quintet). ISBN 978-0-7011-3944-5
- Ugly Rumours (1998). ISBN 978-1-85459-426-6
- 1968: Marching in the Streets (1998). ISBN 978-0-7475-3763-2
- Fear of Mirrors Arcadia Books (4 August 1998). ISBN 978-1-900850-10-0; University of Chicago Press (10 August 2010). ISBN 978-1-906497-15-6
- The Book of Saladin (1998; 2nd in the "Islam Quintet"). ISBN 978-1-85984-834-0
- Masters of the Universe? NATO's Balkan Crusade (2000). ISBN 978-1-85984-752-7
- Clash of Fundamentalisms: Crusades, Jihads and Modernity (2002). ISBN 978-1-85984-679-7
- Bush in Babylon: The Recolonisation of Iraq (2003). ISBN 978-1-85984-583-7
- Street Fighting Years: An Autobiography of the Sixties (2005); reissued edn. ISBN 978-1-84467-029-1
- Speaking of Empire and Resistance: Conversations with Tariq Ali (2005). ISBN 978-1-56584-954-9
- Rough Music: Blair, Bombs, Baghdad, London, Terror (2005). ISBN 978-1-84467-545-6
- Conversations with Edward Said (2005). ISBN 978-1-905422-04-3
- A Sultan in Palermo (2005; featuring Muhammad al-Idrisi and Roger II of Sicily; 4th in the "Islam Quintet"). ISBN 978-1-84467-025-3
- The Leopard and the Fox: A Pakistani Tragedy (2006). ISBN 978-1-905422-29-6
- Pirates of the Caribbean: Axis of Hope (2006) ISBN 978-1-84467-102-1; revised edn. (2008). ISBN 978-1-84467-248-6
- A Banker for All Seasons: Bank of Crooks and Cheats Incorporated (2007). ISBN 978-1-905422-65-4
- The Assassination: Who Killed Indira G? (2008). ISBN 978-1-905422-85-2
- The Duel: Pakistan on the Flight Path of American Power (2008). ISBN 978-1-84737-355-7
- The Protocols of the Elders of Sodom: and other Essays (2009). ISBN 978-1-84467-367-4
- The Idea of Communism (non-fiction) (2009). ISBN 978-1-906497-26-2
- Night of the Golden Butterfly (2010; 5th in the "Islam Quintet"). ISBN 978-1-84467-611-8
- The Obama Syndrome: Surrender at Home, War Abroad (2010). ISBN 978-1-84467-449-7
- On History: Tariq Ali and Oliver Stone in Conversation. (2011), ISBN 978-1-60846-149-3
- Kashmir: The Case for Freedom (2011). ISBN 1-844-67735-4
- The Extreme Centre: A Warning (2015). ISBN 978-1-78478-262-7
- Permanent Counter Revolution (2016). ISBN 978-1-78478-432-4
- The Dilemmas of Lenin: Terrorism, War, Empire, Love, Revolution (2017). ISBN 978-1-78663-110-7
- Winston Churchill: His Times, His Crimes (2022). ISBN 978-1-78873-577-3
- You Can't Please All: Memoirs 1980–2024 (2024). ISBN 978-1-80429-090-3

== See also ==
- List of British Pakistanis
