= Joint Anti-Fascist Refugee Committee =

American nonprofit, 1941–1955

Joint Anti-Fascist Refugee Committee (JAFRC)
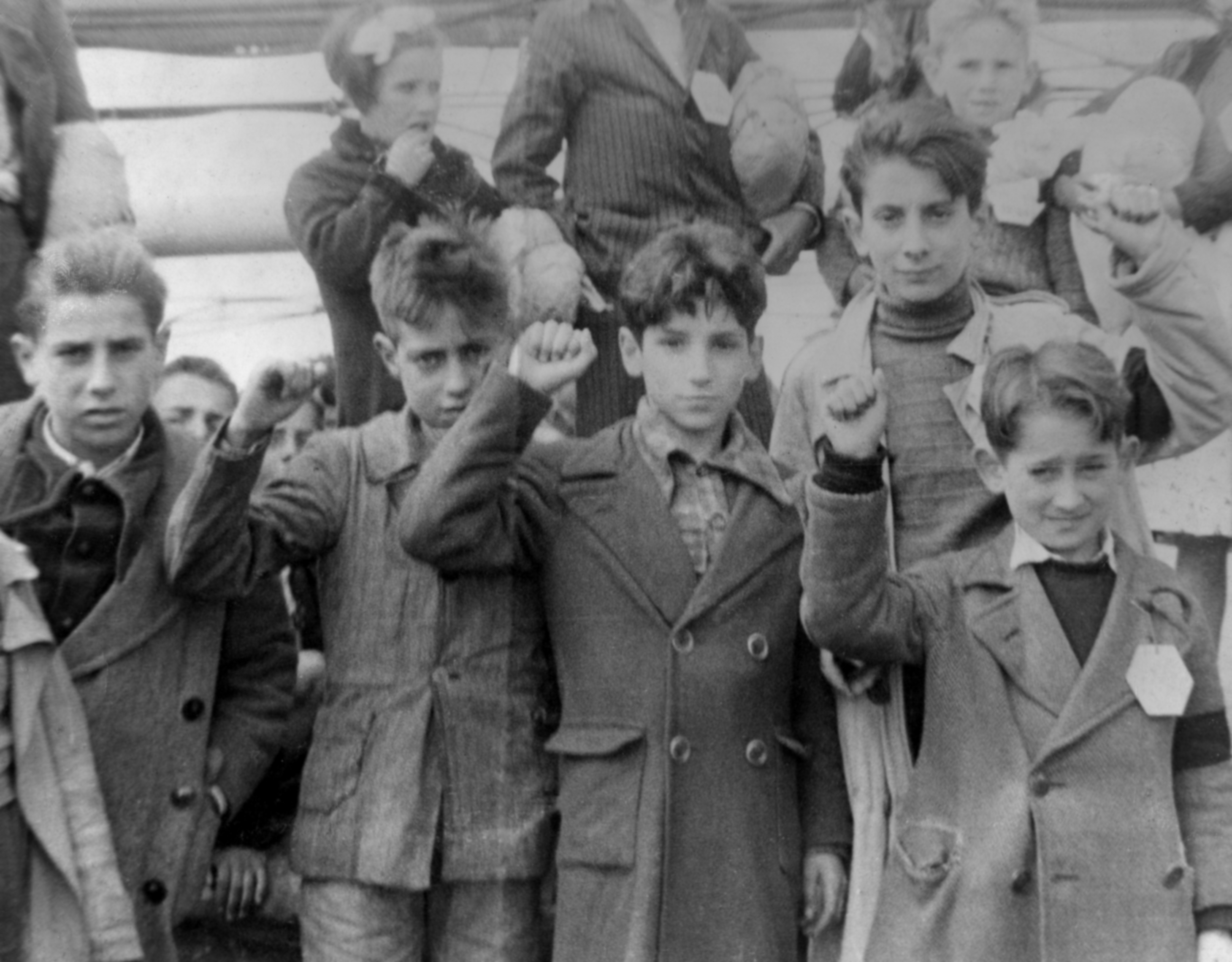
- Children preparing for evacuation, some giving Spanish Republican salute (raised fist)
- Formation: 1941
- Founder: Edward K. Barsky
- Founded at: New York City
- Dissolved: 1955
- Merger of: North American Committee to Aid Spanish Democracy, American Medical Bureau
- Headquarters: New York City
- Location: 192 Lexington Avenue, New York NY 10016
- Coordinates: 40.745054°N 73.980882°W
- Services: Humanitarian aid for Spanish Civil War refugees
- National Honorary Chairman: Walter Rautensrauch
- National Chairman: Edward K. Barsky
- Secretary: Helen R. Bryan
- Treasurer: Lyman R. Bradley
- Website: Official website

Joint Anti-Fascist Refugee Committee (JAFRC) was a nonprofit organization to provide humanitarian aid to refugees of the Spanish Civil War.

== History ==
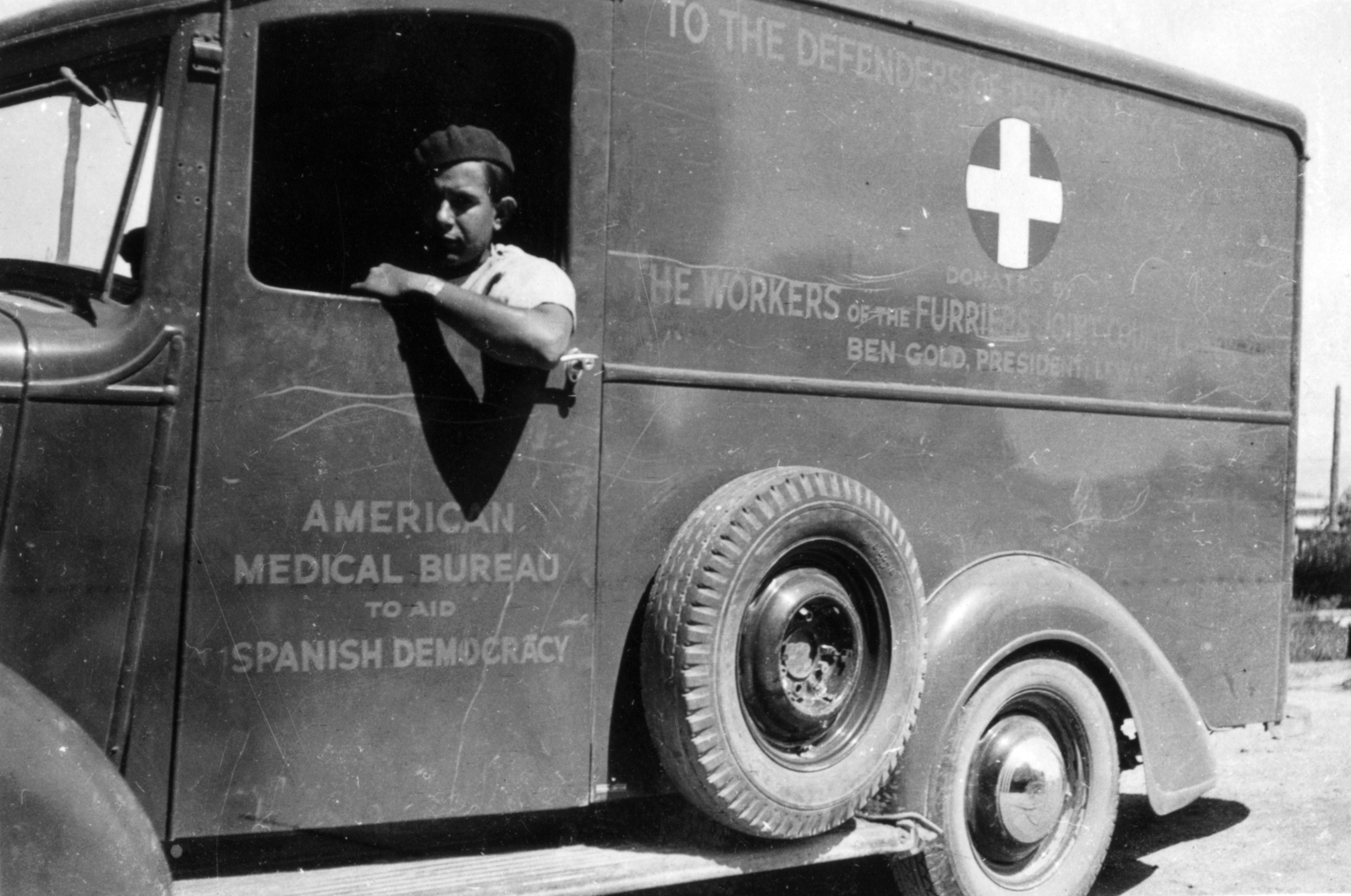
Ambulance of American Medical Bureau in Spain (1937)

In 1941, the Joint Anti-Fascist Refugee Committee was formed by Lincoln Battalion veterans of the Spanish Civil War to provide aid to refugees who were Spanish Loyalists from Francoist Spain. It superseded previous groups, including the North American Committee to Aid Spanish Democracy and the American Medical Bureau, the latter of which Barsky had founded in 1936. Specifically, the JAFRC was "dedicated to the rescue and relief of thousands of anti-fascist fighters trapped in Vichy, France, and North Africa' so that they might "return to the active fight against the Axis."

The JAFRC established a fundraising organization, the Spanish Refugee Appeal of the Joint Anti-Fascist Refugee Committee. Dorothy Parker took charge of the fundraising of the committee, which soon attracted the support of Leonard Bernstein, Albert Einstein, Lillian Hellman, Langston Hughes, and Orson Welles.

In 1942, the committee was licensed to do so in Vichy France by President Franklin Roosevelt's wartime administration and was then granted tax-exempt status.

In 1946, the committee began to face relentless criticism and scrutiny from federal government organizations. In 1948, the Bureau of Internal Revenue (now known as the Internal Revenue Service) revoked the JAFRC's tax-exempt status. Following this, the Subversive Activities Control Board (SACB) attempted to compel the JAFRC to register as a communist front organization.n.

In April 1951, Allan Rosenberg successfully argued for the committee in Anti-Fascist Committee v. McGrath before the US Supreme Court.

In 1955, the committee's board voted to disband.

== People ==
=== Leaders ===
According to letterhead dated March 17, 1944, leaders included:

- Walter Rautenstrauch, National Honorary Chairman
- Edward K. Barsky, National Chairman
- Lyman R. Bradley, National Treasurer
- Helen R. Bryan, National Secretary

National Sponsors included:

- Dr. Comfort A. Adams
- Rabbi Michael Aper
- Dr. Hery Lambert Bibby
- James L. Brewer
- Dr. Walter B. Cannon
- Prof. Richard T. Cox
- Martha Dodd
- Julien Duvivier
- Dr. Frederick May Eliot
- Dr. Henry Pratt Fairchild
- Lion Feuchtwanger
- Prof. Irving Fisher
- Prof. Mitchell Franklin
- Rev. Stephen H. Fritchman
- Prof. Marion Hathaway
- Kenneth Leslie
- Princess Helga zu Loewenstein
- Dr. Robert Morss Lovett
- Prof. Kirtley F. Mather
- Philip Merivale
- Rt. Rev. Edward L. Parsons
- Prof. Renato Poggioli
- Dr. Francis M. Pottenger
- Paul Robeson
- Prof. Harlow Shapley
- Dalton Trumbo
- Dame May Whitty
- Dr. Max Yergan

=== Members ===
- Moses Fishman
- Mark Straus MD
- Arthur Szyk (alleged)

=== Spanish Refugee Appeal supporters ===
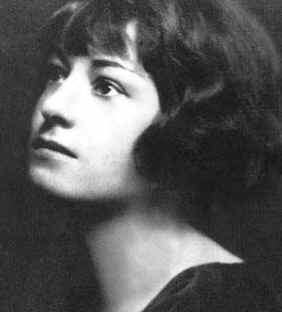
Dorothy Parker raised money for JAFRC

Appeal Officers:

- Pablo Picasso, Honorary Chair
- Dorothy Parker, Chairman

National Sponsors included:

- Rev. Dr. Charles B. Ackley
- Lemuel Ayers
- Aline Bernstein
- Leonard Bernstein
- Alvah Bessie
- Lyman R. Bradley
- Dorothy Brewster
- Arthur G. Brodeur
- Henrietta Buckmaster
- Rabbi Elliott Burstein
- Allan Chase
- Edward Chodorov
- John M. Coffee
- Rabbi J. X. Coeh
- Charles A. Collins
- Eugene P. Connolly
- Kyle Crichton
- Bartley C. Crum
- Bernard Davidoff
- Agnes George De Mille
- Mrs. George Adams Dewey
- Earl B. Dickerson
- Dean Dixon
- Martha Dodd
- Olin Downes
- Muriel Draper
- Albert Einstein
- Rabbi Mitchel S. Eskolsky
- Philip Evergood
- Henry Pratt Fairchild
- L.S. Fanning
- Howard Fast
- Lion Feuchtwanger
- Louis Finger
- Elizabeth P. Frazier
- Rve. Stephen Fritchman
- Betty Garrett
- Frank Gervasi
- Elinor S. Gimbel
- Rabbi Solomon Goldman
- Robert Gordis
- William Gropper
- Chaim Gross
- Ralph H. Grundlach
- Richard Gump
- Ralph Gundlach
- Marion Hathaway
- Rita Hayworth
- Lillian Hellman
- Libby Holman
- Langston Hughes
- Walter Huston
- Stanley M. Isaacs
- Mrs. Sydney Joseph
- Barney Josephson
- Rober W. Kenny
- Rockwell Kent
- Fiske Kimball
- Arthur Kober
- Alfred Kreymborg
- Canada Lee
- M.V. Leof
- Kenneth Leslie
- Ray Lev
- Walter H. Leibman
- Daniel A. Longbaker
- Louis Lozowick
- Florence J. Luscomb
- Richard Lyndon
- Louis F. McCabe
- John T. McManus
- Rev. Dr. John D. Mackay
- Manuel Magana
- Albert Maltz
- Alfred T. Manacher
- Richard Maney
- Heinrich Mann
- Thomas Mann
- Alicia Markova
- George Marshall
- Kirtley F. Mather
- F.O. Matthiesen
- Rev. William Howard Melesh
- Yehudi Menuhin
- Saul Mills
- James K. Moffitt
- Pierre Monteux
- Karen Morley
- William Morris Jr.
- Zero Mostel
- Jarmila Novotná
- Michael J. Obermeier
- Harvey O'Connor
- Eugene O'Neill
- Isabel de Palencia
- Aubrey Pankey
- Beryl Parker
- Edward L. Parsons
- J. Gilbert Peirce
- Gerry Pelles
- Gregor Piatigorsky
- David de Sola Pool
- Adam Clayton Powell Jr.
- Walter Rautenstrauch
- Anton Refregier
- John Reiner
- Quentin Reynolds
- Paul Robeson
- William M. Rubin
- Mrs. Maurice Bower Saul
- Jimmy Savo
- Georges Schreiber
- Hazel Scott
- Anna Seghers
- Lisa Sergio
- Harlow Shapley
- Sol Silverman
- Hilda Simms
- Edgar Snow
- Moses Soyer
- Johannes Steel
- Vilhjalmur Stefansson
- Mark Straus
- Jack Strauss
- Arthur Szyk
- Genevieve Tabouis
- Dalton Trumbo
- M.S. Vidaver
- Harry F. Ward
- Morris Watson
- Margaret Webster
- Orson Welles
- Mrs. Philip E. Wilcox
- Mitchell Wilson
- Carl Zigrosser
- Leane Zugsmith

== See also ==
- Joint Anti-Fascist Refugee Committee v. McGrath
- North American Committee to Aid Spanish Democracy
- American Medical Bureau
- Lincoln Battalion

== External sources ==
- Yale University Archives
- Digital Commonwealth
