= Wall of Memory (Ukraine) =

- Стіна Пам'яті
- Interactive map of Wall of Memory
- Location: Baikove Cemetery, Kyiv, Ukraine
- Coordinates: 50.416061°N 30.505643°E
- Designer: Ada Rybachuk and Volodymyr Melnychenko (artists); Avraam Miletsky (architect)
- Type: Monumental high-relief; part of the Memory Park memorial complex
- Material: Reinforced concrete with steel armature
- Length: 213 m
- Height: 4.5–16 m
- Beginning date: 1968
- Completion date: 1981
- Dedicated to: Death and remembrance

The Wall of Memory (Ukrainian: Стіна Пам'яті) is a monumental high-relief and a landmark of Soviet modernism located in Baikove Cemetery in Kyiv, Ukraine. Created between 1968 and 1981 by the artists Ada Rybachuk and Volodymyr Melnychenko within the Memory Park memorial complex, the work was nearly finished when, in January 1982, Soviet authorities ordered it covered with concrete on ideological grounds. Substantial sections remain buried; partial restoration began in 2018.

== Location and context ==
The Wall of Memory stands in Memory Park next to a landmark of neomodernist architecture — the Kyiv Crematorium, whose halls of farewell take the form of opened petals or portals. The crematorium and surrounding park were designed by architect Avraam Miletsky in collaboration with the monumental artists Ada Rybachuk and Volodymyr Melnychenko.

The high-relief was 213 metres long and ranged in height from 4.5 to 16 metres, covering more than 2,000 square metres in total — described as the largest bas-relief in Europe.

== Design and themes ==
The monumental composition is dedicated to the themes of death and grief. The wall takes the form of a ribbon on which scenes from world mythology and history unfold — from the myth of Prometheus to events of the Second World War and the post-war era.

Eschatological universal motifs — Icarus, Prometheus, Spring, Rainbow, Blossoming Garden, Love, Creativity, Motherhood, Knowledge, Man and Beast, and Heroic Deed — were intended to dissolve the personal grief of mourners into shared, collective experience. By the end of the funerary path, only a purified, communal memory of death was meant to remain. Individual suffering was gradually displaced by universal human experience. Symbolically, the wall passed through the "furnaces" of Babi Yar, Majdanek, and Auschwitz before resolving in imagery of the resilience of life.

== Construction ==
The Wall of Memory was built on a retaining wall installed to stabilise the soil around Memory Park. The artists transformed this engineering element into the centrepiece of the entire complex. They first welded a steel framework for the bas-reliefs, then poured concrete onto it. The grey forms were intended to be coloured using encaustic — an ancient technique combining pigments with beeswax.

Rybachuk and Melnychenko worked on what they considered their magnum opus for thirteen years, from 1968 to 1981.

== Destruction ==
In January 1982, by order of the Ministry of Culture of the Ukrainian SSR, work on the wall was halted. The Artistic Commission for Fine Art and the Expert Council on Monumental Sculpture declared the Wall of Memory "alien to the principles of socialist realism".

According to one account, Avraam Miletsky played a negative role in the decision: after a quarrel with the artists, the architect personally pushed for the destruction of the monument. According to another version, the leader of the Ukrainian SSR, Volodymyr Shcherbytsky, visited the park and reportedly objected to what he called the "non-Slavic" — and "Jewish" — features of the depicted figures.

In May 1982, the bas-reliefs were buried under tons of liquid concrete, transforming the work into what has since been called the "Wall of Oblivion". It is the only such monumental bas-relief in the world to have been concealed in this manner.

== Restoration ==
In 1992, the Ministry of Culture of independent Ukraine, together with the State Committee for Construction and the Council of the Union of Architects, condemned the act of vandalism, annulled all decisions ordering the destruction of the Wall, and recommended its restoration. Concrete restoration work, however, did not begin for another quarter-century.

On 18 May 2018, as part of Kyiv Art Week, a fragment of the Wall titled "Defence of the Fatherland" was unveiled along the path to the crematorium; about six square metres of relief were cleared. In autumn 2021, through the work of the Artists' Heritage Fund, around 120 additional square metres of relief were restored, revealing the figure of a woman blowing a horn to summon defenders of the country during war.

Ada Rybachuk did not live to see the restoration of the work; she died in 2010. Volodymyr Melnychenko witnessed the partial unveilings of 2018 and 2021 before his death in April 2023.

== In film ==
In 1988, director I. Goldstein made the documentary film The Wall (Стіна) about the complex on Baikove Cemetery.

== See also ==
- Baikove Cemetery
- Ada Rybachuk
- Volodymyr Melnychenko
