= Joint Anti-Fascist Refugee Committee v. McGrath =

- Supreme Court of the United States

Argued October 11, 1950 Decided April 30, 1951
- Full case name: Joint Anti-Fascist Refugee Committee v. J. Howard McGrath, Attorney General, et al.
- Citations: 341 U.S. 123 (more) 71 S. Ct. 624; 95 L. Ed. 2d 817; 1951 U.S. LEXIS 2349

Holding
- The judgments are reversed and the cases are remanded to the District Court with instructions to deny the motions that the complaints be dismissed for failure to state claims upon which relief could be granted.

Court membership
- Chief Justice Fred M. Vinson Associate Justices Hugo Black · Stanley F. Reed; Felix Frankfurter · William O. Douglas; Robert H. Jackson · Harold H. Burton; Tom C. Clark · Sherman Minton

Case opinions
- Plurality: Burton, joined by Douglas
- Concurrence: Black
- Concurrence: Frankfurter
- Concurrence: Jackson
- Concurrence: Douglas
- Dissent: Reed, joined by Vinson, Minton
- Clark took no part in the consideration or decision of the case.

Joint Anti-Fascist Refugee Committee v. McGrath, 341 U.S. 123 (1951), was a United States Supreme Court case that held that groups could sue to challenge their inclusion on the Attorney General's List of Subversive Organizations. The decision was fractured on its reasoning, with each of the Justices in the majority writing separate opinions.

== Background ==
The Joint Anti-Fascist Refugee Committee was formed by Lincoln Battalion veterans of the Spanish Civil War to provide aid to the Spanish Loyalists who were refugees from Francoist Spain. In 1942, it was licensed to do so in Vichy France by President Franklin D. Roosevelt's wartime administration and was then granted tax-exempt status. Dorothy Parker took charge of fundraising for the committee, which soon attracted the support of Leonard Bernstein, Albert Einstein, Lillian Hellman, Langston Hughes, and Orson Welles.

In 1946, Dr. Edward K. Barsky and the rest of the leadership of the committee were held in contempt of Congress after they on principle refused to comply with subpoenas from the House Un-American Activities Committee. On March 21, 1947, President Harry S. Truman issued Executive Order 9835, which led Attorney General Tom C. Clark to publish the Attorney General's List of Subversive Organizations. The list sought the public identification groups the Attorney General considered to be "totalitarian, Fascist, Communist, or subversive." The committee were included on the list. Under Section 9A of the Hatch Act of 1939, that information was disseminated among the agencies of the US government.

In 1948, the Anti-Fascists sued in the United States District Court for the District of Columbia by alleging that they were exclusively a relief organization, the listing had deprived them of their rights under the Due Process Clause and the First Amendment, and they had been injured by their loss of tax-exempt status and the damage to their reputation. The Justice Department responded in a two-sentence motion, which said the lawsuit failed to state a claim. In June 1948, the district court dismissed the Anti-Fascists' lawsuit without an opinion.

In February and April 1949, US District Judges Jennings Bailey and Matthew Francis McGuire dismissed similar lawsuits by the National Council of American-Soviet Friendship and the International Workers Order.

In August 1949, the Court of Appeals for the District of Columbia Circuit ruled against the Anti-Fascists. Circuit Judge James McPherson Proctor, joined by Judge Bennett Champ Clark, affirmed the district court, while held that the Anti-Fascists had not been injured by being included on the list of subversives. In a lengthy dissent, Circuit Judge Henry White Edgerton wrote that the listing was "contrary to fact, unauthorized and unconstitutional." The D.C. Circuit likewise rejected appeals by the other two organizations.

== Supreme Court ==
=== Oral argument and consideration ===
In May 1950, a divided Supreme Court upheld the contempt convictions of the anti-fascists' leadership. The Supreme Court then granted the listed subversive organizations' petitions for writs of certiorari. Even after review had been granted, the Justices ignored arguments from their clerks to avoid hearing the case on the basis of the newly passed McCarran Internal Security Act.

Oral arguments were heard on October 11, 1950, where O. John Rogge appeared for the Anti-Fascists, David Rein appeared for the Soviet Friendship Council, Allan R. Rosenberg appeared for the IWO, and Solicitor General Philip Perlman appeared for the government. Justice Tom C. Clark, who had initiated the list of subversives when he was the Attorney General, recused himself from the case.

The Court unusually did not vote on the case at its next conference, and at the following conference, it deadlocked 4-4. After Justice Robert H. Jackson was persuaded to switch his vote, Justice Harold Hitz Burton submitted a draft opinion in favor of the anti-fascists on November 20. However, Justice Jackson's intense personal dislike of Justice William O. Douglas made him uncomfortable joining the majority and led him to complete an uncirculated draft concurrence in which he attacked Douglas's criticism of the government because it "denounced as ‘totalitarians’—by one how never has been able to see totalitarianism in any Communist Case before this Court." Justice Stanley Forman Reed delayed completing his dissent while the majority Justices were airing their differences. That left Justice Felix Frankfurter to complain that his "holding up judgment" had been unparalleled for at least 50 years. Reed ultimately circulated a revised version of his dissent on April 21, 1951.

=== Controlling opinion ===
On April 30, 1951, the Supreme Court delivered judgment in favor of the anti-fascists by reversing and remanding by a vote of 5–3. The Court failed to produce a majority opinion and instead offered six different opinions totaling 70 pages.

Justice Harold Hitz Burton, joined only by Justice William O. Douglas, wrote the controlling plurality opinion. Burton accepted as true all of the allegations made by the anti-fascists because they had never been contested by Justice Department. According to Burton, there was standing to sue for a violation of "the right of a bona fide charitable origination to carrying on its work, free from defamatory statements." Burton then determined that the Attorney General's behavior had been "patently arbitrary." The Court remanded to the district court with instructions to determine if the groups were in fact communistic.

=== Justice Black's concurrence ===
Justice Hugo Black concurred by writing alone to clarify that he thought the Attorney General's list was itself an unconstitutional violation of bill of attainder clause. He appended a passage from the footnotes of the historian Thomas Babington Macaulay's History of England from the Accession of James the Second by describing the evils of the Great Act of Attainder enacted at the behest of James II of England.

=== Justice Frankfurter's concurrence ===
Justice Frankfurter concurred by writing alone for over 25 pages. Frankfurter first reasoned that the plaintiffs had standing to sue because their injuries "would be clearly actionable at common law." He then went on to argue that the Attorney General's listing was an unconstitutional violation of the Due Process Clause because those listed had not been given notice and a hearing.

=== Justice Jackson's concurrence ===
Justice Jackson concurred alone. He focused much of his criticism on a separate case decided that day in which the equally-divided Supreme Court had affirmed a lower court ruling permitting the government to fire Dorothy Bailey for suspected disloyalty. Jackson wrote it was "justice turned bottom-side up" to grant relief to the groups while denying it to an individual and that the Court "may create the impression that the decision of the case does not raise above the political controversy that engendered it."

=== Justice Douglas's concurrence ===
Justice Douglas also added a concurrence, alone. Writing that he felt the need to combat a "fifth column worming its way into government," Douglas still feared that denying procedural due process to subversives was "to start down the totalitarian path." He then contrasted "our constitutional scheme" to the "technique" of the Nuremberg trials prosecutor, who had been Justice Jackson. Douglas also spent several pages criticizing the equally-divided Court's decision to deny relief in Bailey's case.

=== Justice Reed's dissent ===
Justice Reed, joined by Chief Justice Fred M. Vinson and Justice Sherman Minton, dissented. Reed felt that the plaintiffs had no standing to sue because they had suffered no injury. Regardless, he opined that constitutional due process requires neither notice nor a hearing.

== Subsequent developments ==
In 1952, the United States Treasury sued the anti-fascists for back taxes now owed, and three years later, the committee disbanded. In 1954, a divided Supreme Court upheld New York state's revocation of Dr. Barsky's medical license. After a heavily publicized trial, the New York State Insurance Department ordered the IWO liquidated in 1954 and cited "political hazard."

In April 1954, U.S. District Judge James Ward Morris dismissed the anti-fascists lawsuit again and now found that the new Executive Order 10450 had made the controversy moot. In August 1954, the D.C. Circuit reversed that judgment and gave the groups the opportunity to pursue administrative review. In November 1955, District Judge Luther Youngdahl dismissed the group's lawsuit again. In February 1957, the D.C. Circuit affirmed by reasoning the group had failed to adequately seek administrative review.

After the Court's second decision in Communist Party v. Subversive Activities Control Board (1961), the Soviet Friendship Council continued pursuing its challenge to the Attorney General's listing. In May 1963, it ultimately succeeded, when the D.C. Circuit concluded that the evidence proffered against the council had been "negligible."

== See also ==
- Joint Anti-Fascist Refugee Committee
- Australian Communist Party v Commonwealth (1951)
- McCarthyism
- North American Committee to Aid Spanish Democracy
- Smith Act trials of Communist Party leaders
- Suppression of Communism Act, 1950
- List of United States Supreme Court cases, volume 341
- List of United States Supreme Court cases by the Vinson Court
- List of United States Supreme Court cases involving the First Amendment
