= Albert Edward Harris =

British engineer and artist

A. E. Harris
- Born: Albert Edward Harris c. 1870; Oxford, England
- Died: 24 October 1933; Brigus, Newfoundland and Labrador Canada

Albert Edward (A. E.) Harris (c. 1870 – 24 October 1933) was a British engineer and artist, known for his depictions of the Newfoundland landscape.

Harris emigrated to Newfoundland in 1907. Initially employed the Reid Group of England at their sulphate pulp mill in Bishop's Falls, Newfoundland, he ended his career in the lumber industry as Managing Director of the Anglo-Newfoundland Development Co. Ltd, in Grand Falls, Newfoundland. In 1929, Harris moved to Kent Cottage in Brigus, Newfoundland, that had been rented to American Artist Rockwell Kent during World War I. He named it "Kent Cottage" after Kent County in England. It was here that Harris lived until 1933.

Harris was one of the founding members of The Newfoundland Society of Art in 1925. The Society sponsored annual exhibitions of local and imported art, and exported local art. The Society disbanded in 1937, following a series of financial troubles, as well as the deaths of its founders, Fanny (Hector) McNeil in 1928 and Harris. It was replaced by the St. John's Art Students Club.

Harris died at Brigus on October 24, 1933. His remains were taken to England on the S.S. Newfoundland for burial there.

Harris's work is in the collection of the Art Gallery of Newfoundland and Labrador, now The Rooms Provincial Art Gallery, in St. John's, Newfoundland and Labrador.
