= Rybachuk =

Rybachuk is a surname of Ukrainian origin. It is a patronymic derivation from surname/nickname Rybak, the latter literally meaning "fisherman". Notable people with this surname include:

- Ada Rybachuk (1931–2010), Ukraine/Soviet muralist, painter, sculptor and architect
- Oleh Rybachuk (born 1958), Ukrainian politician
