= American Medical Bureau =

Humanitarian aid organization in the Spanish Civil War

- Founded: 1936
- Founder: Edward K. Barsky
- Dissolved: 1939
- Type: Non-governmental organization, Non-profit organization
- Purpose: Humanitarian
- Location: United States
- Region served: Second Spanish Republic
- Method: Aid

The American Medical Bureau (AMB), also known as the American Medical Bureau to Save Spanish Democracy, was a humanitarian aid institution associated to the Lincoln Battalion that provided a medical corps, nursing systems for casualties, accommodation, and treatment to those who were wounded while they fought for the Spanish Loyalists during the Spanish Civil War (1936–1939).

== History ==
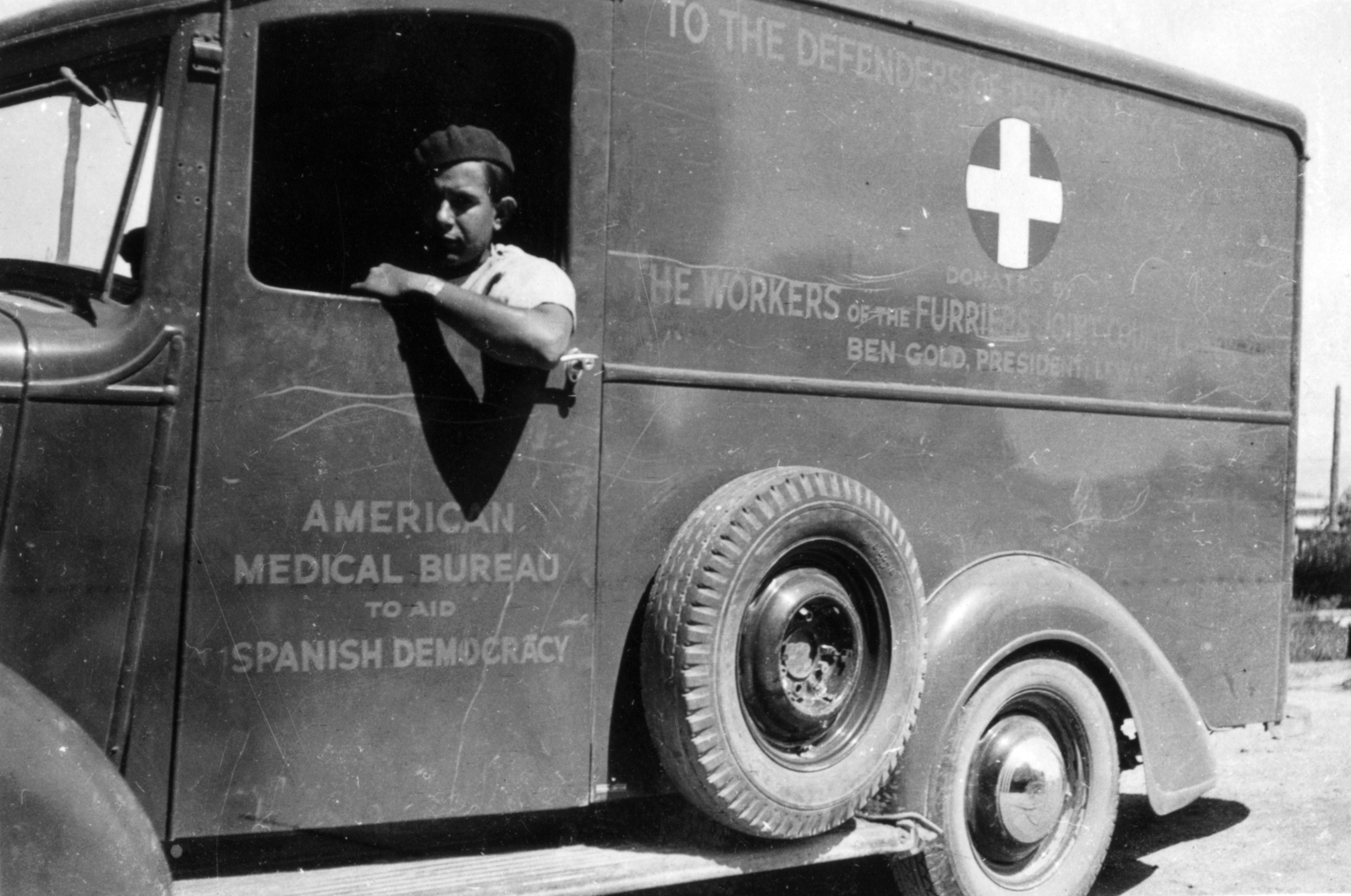
AMB ambulance in Spain, 1937

Organized by Dr. Edward K. Barsky, the American Medical Bureau recruited doctors, dentists, nurses, administrators, ambulance drivers to support the Spanish Loyalists. In its fundraising events, it also used the names American Medical Bureau to Save Spanish Democracy and Medical Bureau & North American Committee to Aid Spanish Democracy.

In the United States, the AMB also staged events to try to shift public opinion away from supporting the aid boycott to the Spanish Republic, which was imposed by the US government after the Non-intervention Committee's agreements. In Spain, the AMB was assigned to hospitals and medical centers of the Spanish Military Medical Services (Cuerpo de Sanidad), mainly at the Gómez Ulla Military Hospital, in Madrid, and also to frontline locations. AMB members, who also included women, treated both foreign and Spanish combatants.

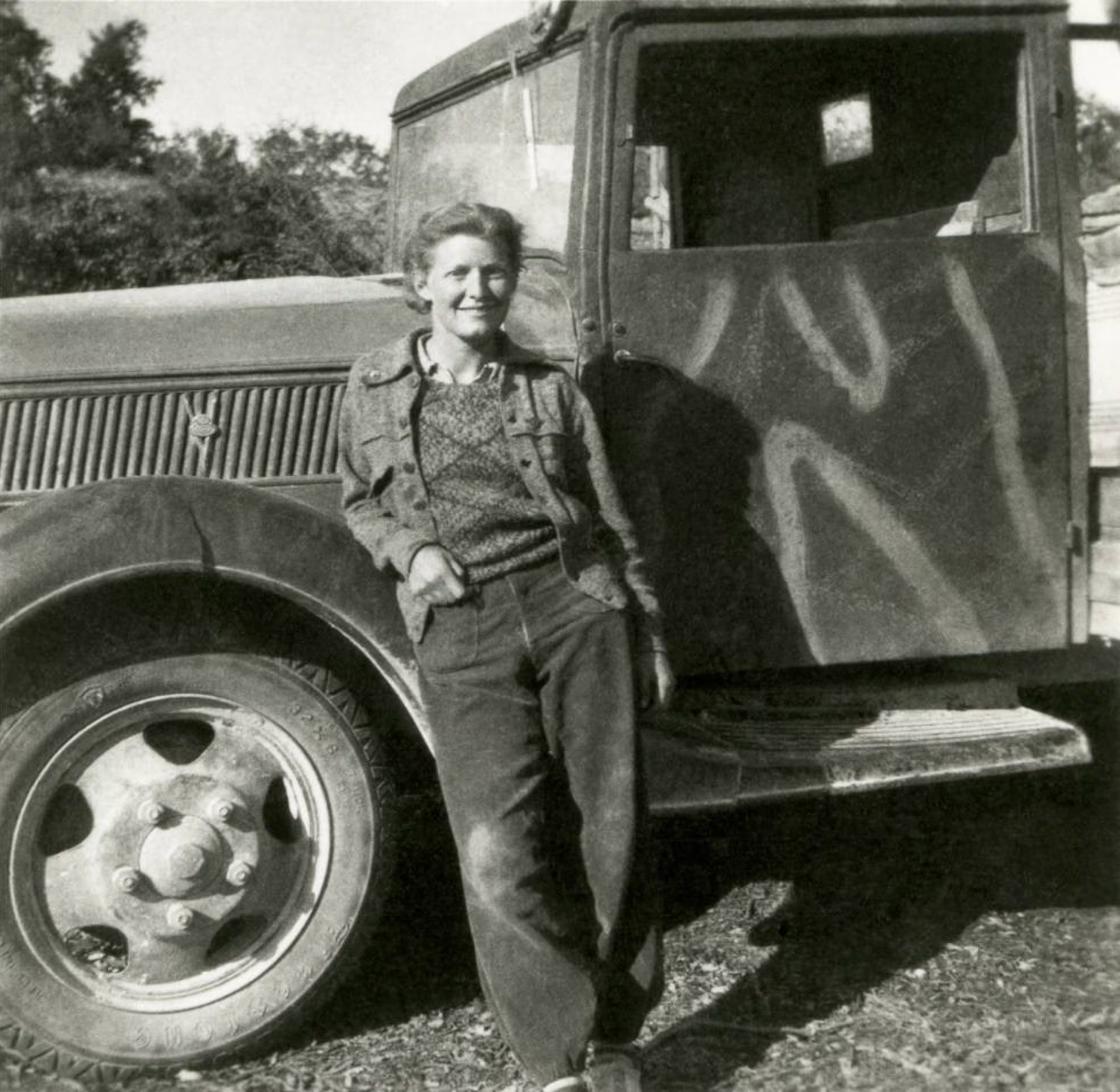
Evelyn Hutchins in front of her ambulance c. 1938

By the end of the war, most of the Spanish aid committees and the leadership councils of the AMB were women. Many women leaders in the aid movement were wives of prominent American leftists or of soldiers in the Lincoln Battalion. Katherine Duncan, the wife to Governor LaFollette's secretary, and Peggy Dennis, a communist party leader, were leaders in the active Madison, Wisconsin, chapter. Marion Merriman, wife to Abraham Lincoln Battalion Commander Robert Hale Merriman (the supposed inspiration of Ernest Hemingway's hero in For Whom the Bell Tolls), was the chairwoman of the large San Francisco, California, branch of the organization. She and one other woman, Fredericka Martin, hold the honour of being the only woman to receive officer commissions from the Spanish Républicain. Evelyn Hutchins, an active member of the AMB, agitated for years to be a hospital driver on the front lines, but Spanish Republican policies prevented women from serving on there until 1938, when Hutchins won the right to serve on the front line as a driver.

== See also ==
- International Brigades
- Spanish Republican Army
- Yankee Squadron
- Lincoln Battalion
- Military history of African Americans
- XV International Brigade

== Bibliography ==
- Jane Pacht Brickman, "Medical McCarthyism and the Punishment of Internationalist Physicians in the United States," in Anne-Emanuelle Birn and Theodore M. Brown (eds.), Comrades in Health: US Health Internationalists, Abroad and at Home. New Brunswick, NJ: Rutgers University Press, 2013; pp. 82–100.
- Peter N. Carroll, The Odyssey of the Abraham Lincoln Brigade: Americans in the Spanish Civil War. Stanford, CA: Stanford University Press, 1994.
- Walter J. Lear, "American Medical Support for Spanish Democracy, 1936-1938," in Anne-Emanuelle Birn and Theodore M. Brown (eds.), Comrades in Health: US Health Internationalists, Abroad and at Home. New Brunswick, NJ: Rutgers University Press, 2013; pp. 65–81.
- De Quesada, Alejandro; Walsh, Stephen (2015). The Spanish Civil War 1936–39 (2): Republican forces. Osprey Publishing. p. F. ISBN 9781782007852.
