= Esther Shephard =

American folklorist (1891–1975)

- Born: Esther Maria Lofstrand; July 29, 1891 Minneapolis, Minnesota, U.S.
- Died: February 10, 1975 (aged 83) San Francisco, California, U.S.
- Notable works: Paul Bunyan, McNeil Press, 1924; reprinted with illustrations by Rockwell Kent, New York: Harcourt Brace, 1941.
- Spouse: Richard Thomas Shepherd (m. 1914–1915) C. Ellis Shephard (m. 1921–1938)

Esther Shephard (née Lofstrand; July 29, 1891 – February 10, 1975) was an American folklorist, poet, playwright, literary critic, and educator known for her collection of tales about the legendary figure Paul Bunyan.

== Early life and education ==
Born in Minneapolis, Minnesota, in 1891, Esther Maria Lofstrand's parents were John August Lofstrand and Justina Lofstrand (née Lindberg). The 1900 census lists the family as farmers in Stanchfield, Minnesota, a township approximately 50 miles (80 km) north of Minneapolis. Both her parents were born in Sweden.

Her first employment was as a public school teacher in Minnesota, but she moved to Montana sometime after 1910 to teach in the town of Belgrade. In 1914, she married Richard Thomas Shepherd, a foreman with General Railway Signal. Although married in Minnesota, the couple lived in Bozeman. Scarcely six months after the wedding, Richard died from a pulmonary embolism.

Following her husband's death, Shephard moved to Washington state, where she began studying at the University of Washington. She received a BA in 1920, an MA in 1921, and a PhD in 1938. Her PhD dissertation examined the works of nineteenth-century American poet Walt Whitman.

In 1921, she married C. Ellis Shephard of Seattle, who worked in insurance. The couple had one son, Richard Jolyon Shephard. Esther Shephard died in San Francisco on February 10, 1975, at the age of 83.

== Career ==
Shephard held teaching posts at Reed College in Portland, Oregon (1921–1922); the University of Washington, Seattle (1928–30); and Lower Columbia College, Longview, Washington (1934–1935). In 1939, she joined the English Department at San Jose State University, where she taught until 1959.

In addition to her university teaching, she was known as a poet, playwright, literary critic, and collector of folklore. The 1928 survey Women of the West lists three plays: Jet, Pierrette's Heart, and The Wife, as well as a work of folklore titled The Gift of Signy. She was a regular contributor to academic journals.

=== Literary criticism ===
Shephard's academic publications focused on the archival and manuscript study of Walt Whitman's poetry. She was particularly interested in Whitman's literary influences and sources.

The book that emerged from her PhD dissertation, Walt Whitman’s Pose, was published in 1938. It was positively received by the New York Times shortly after its release, with reviewer Peter Monro finding it "an unusually interesting book" that shed light on Whitman as "a poseur and a plagiarist". The conceit that informed the dissertation, and later the published book, was that Whitman created an elaborate literary persona, a "vagabond poet, dressed in laborer's garb". Shephard's perspective was disputed by literary critic Stephen Rachman, who finds her argument "so extreme that it colors her judgment of Leaves of Grass to the point that she has virtually no sympathy or ear for Whitman and his work".

=== Folklore ===
Shephard's classic work is Paul Bunyan, a collection of logging tales initially published in a limited edition by the McNeil Press in 1924. According to a laudatory review in the Washington Historical Quarterly, Shephard began investigating the tall tales of Paul Bunyan in Washington state as part of her master's thesis on frontier literature. The reviewer stresses that "Shephard's interest in the subject of the mightiest of lumberjacks and his marvelous feats has led her to the acquisition of what, there can be little doubt, is the most complete collection of Paul Bunyan yarns extant". According to the University of Washington Archives, the tall tales were "collected in West Coast logging camps" by Shephard and her husband. Paul Bunyan was republished in an illustrated edition in 1941; American artist Rockwell Kent embellished the text, with 24 full-page illustrations and numerous others.

Shephard further explored folklore through her retelling of the Chinese legend The Cowherd and the Sky Maiden, published in 1950. A review praised "the author’s sense of color and drama" as well as her ability to embody the "stylized poetry so typical of Oriental poems". The book featured black and white Chinese drawings. American composer John Weedon Verrall translated the work into an opera, which premiered at the University of Washington on January 17, 1952.

== Publications ==
Paul Bunyan. Seattle: McNeil Press, 1924; reprinted with illustrations by Rockwell Kent, New York: Harcourt Brace, 1941.

Pierrette's Heart, A Play in One Act. New York: Samuel French, 1924.

(Contributor) Golden Tales of Our America. May Lamberton Becker, ed. New York: Dodd, Mead, 1929; 1963.

Poems. C.E. Shephard, 1938.

Walt Whitman's Pose. New York: Harcourt Brace, 1938.

The Cowherd and the Sky Maiden; A Retelling, in Verse, Decorated with Rhyme and Assonance of an Ancient Chinese Legend, With an After-Piece Explaining the Background of the Legend. Santa Cruz, California: Pacific Rim Publishers, 1950.

An Oriental Tale and a Romantic Poet. Santa Cruz, California: Pacific Rim Publishers, 1967

Selected Poems, Santa Cruz, California: Pacific Rim Publishers, 1968.
