= Fredericka Martin =

Spanish Civil War medic and writer (1905–1992)

- Other names: Fredericka Berenberg

Fredericka Imogene Martin (June 2, 1905 – October 4, 1992) was a writer, historian, environmentalist, photographer, and volunteer during the Spanish Civil War. She is known for her work documenting the role of American medical volunteers and for her work advocating for the Aleuts, an indigenous sealing community in the Pribilof Islands in the Bering Sea.

== Early life and career ==
Fredericka Martin was born in Cooperstown, New York on June 2, 1905 to Frederick and Lydia Martin. Her father, Fred, who worked for the railroads as a fireman, died in a railroad accident before she was born. The Martin side of the family had an differing religious background, as her grandfather William was an Irish Protestant while her grandmother Alice was an Irish Catholic. Because of the disagreements over religious differences they decided that birth order would determine the children's religious assignment (oldest child Catholic, younger Protestant, etc).

When Martin was five, her mother remarried to a George Wilbur who had similarly been widowed and worked for the same railroad company as Fred Martin had. Her family moved to Oneonta, a small city in New York, where she grew up in a warm environment with a half sibling George Jr. and a step sibling from George Sr's previous marriage. According to her own account, Martin had been a "tomboy" as a child. She enjoyed nature and climbing trees, and often did so in the mountains behind her Aunt's home. Martin remembered once finding an unearthed pig corpse which for some reason had become iridescent and sharing it with her horrified cousins.

After graduating from high school, she moved to Jersey City, New Jersey where she worked for the St. Margaret Episcopalian Order of Nuns. She briefly considered becoming a nun, but decided to become a nurse instead, inspired by her Aunt Nellie who had served as a nurse in World War I. Martin graduated from nursing school at Christ Hospital, and then went on to work for various hospitals around New York City, such as Bellevue, Fordham, Lying-In Hospital, and Crotona Park Hospital as a supervisor and head nurse.

In the early 1930s, Freddie became involved in the Labor movement. She joined the nurse's union and participated in classes at the Labor Temple which focused on allowing working class people from all religious backgrounds to express their opinions. She attended political science classes as well as learned Russian and Yiddish.

=== Involvement in Spanish Civil War ===
In 1935, Martin toured Europe, spending time in Germany and Russia. Based on her experience, she became convinced of the growing danger of Fascism in Europe. After returning to the United States she joined the Medical Bureau to Aid Spanish Democracy, an organization created by doctors and citizens to gather medical supplies and necessities for the democratically elected Spanish Republic. Recruited by Dr. Edward Barsky for her leadership and organizational skills, she went to Spain on January 12, 1937, making her one of the first American medical personnel to Spain. Martin took charge of forty four nurses; helped organize six American hospitals on the front, a mobile operating unit, and literacy classes; trained Spanish women in nursing; all while supervising four ambulances, 12 tons of medical supplies, and a 50 bed hospital. The first hospital Martin worked at located in El Romeral opened on February 21, 1937, and they received their first wounded from the bloody battle of Jarama. Martin was affectionately dubbed "Ma" by those at the hospital due to her nurturing but authoritative presence. She would often give out little candies and cakes to cheer up her fellow volunteers who endured grueling and heartbreaking work. Supplies were short, so the nurses made do with open fires for sterilization and anything they could find. In the first part of April, the volunteers opened their own American Base Hospital, located in the summer home of the daughter of Queen Isabella II. Martin worked to relieve the short staffed hospital by training 400 Spanish women to take over nursing roles.

In February 1938, Martin returned to the United States to raise funds for the volunteers still in Spain and to recruit personnel. She toured around the country and told stories of her own experience. She met Dr. Samuel Berenberg, the Director of Public Health in Greenbelt, Maryland, and they got married in 1940.

=== Post war work ===
Martin worked on the Probilof Islands from 1941 to 1942 serving as nurse for the United States' Department of the Interior. Her husband had received an offer to work on a medical assignment and Martin spent her time learning about the culture of the indigenous Aleuts. In her book Before the Storm: A Year in the Pribilof Islands, Martin writes about her personal accounts in which she saw the people facing radical change and the United States' government forcibly evacuating the Aleut. She also worked with R.H. Geoghan on an Aleut language dictionary, and wrote Sea Bears: the Story of the Fur Seal and The Hunting of the Silver Fleece about seals and sealers as well as an article "Wanted: A Pribilof Bill of Rights" advocating for reforms on their treatment.

In 1950 she moved to Cuernavaca, Mexico.

== Honors and awards ==
Martin received an honorary degree from the University of Alaska Fairbanks in 1986.

== Selected publications ==
- Martin, Fredericka I.; Hudson, Ray (2010). Before the storm: a year in the Pribilof Islands, 1941–1942. Fairbanks: University of Alaska Press. ISBN 978-1-60223-076-7. OCLC 435711186.
- Geoghegan, Richard Henry; Martin, Fredericka I. (1944). The Aleut language. Washington, D.C.: United States Dept. of the interior. OCLC 1011882510.
- Martin, Fredericka I.; Nef, Evelyn Stefansson (1946). The hunting of the silver fleece, epic of the fur seal. New York: Greenberg. OCLC 1331968.
- Martin, Fredericka I. (1960). Sea bears; the story of the fur seal. Philadelphia: Chilton Company, Book Division. OCLC 1433378.
