= Kent Cottage =

Coordinates: 47°32′32″N 53°12′07″W

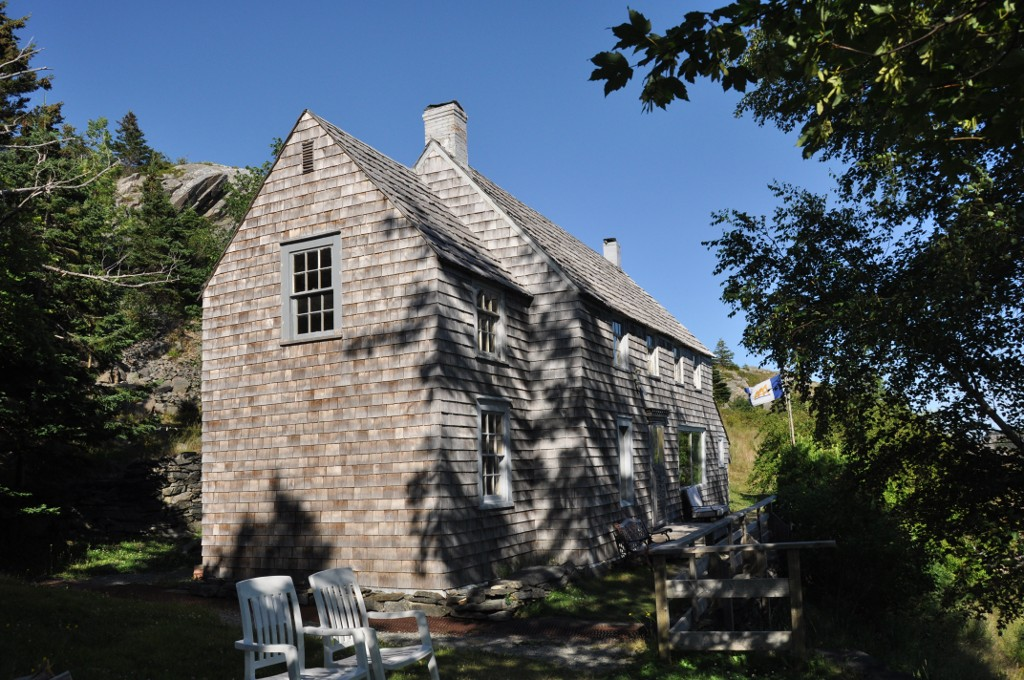
Kent Cottage in 2013

Kent Cottage, Brigus Newfoundland and Labrador

Kent Cottage is a historic dwelling in Brigus, Newfoundland, now used for artist-in-residence and writer-in-residence programs. The surrounding property is known as Landfall.

== History ==
Kent Cottage was originally a small Georgian-style structure built by the Pomeroy family around 1786. It was built near Brigus Bay, on the Battery (which is named for the gun emplacements that were there in the 1740s during King George's War). The area was also known as Freshwater, as there are several streams which were historically a source of water for sealing fleets. The Pomeroy family used the structure as a dwelling for many years but eventually turned it into a barn.

The American artist and writer Rockwell Kent lived in the cottage for about a year and a half in 1914–1915. Trained as an architect, in 1915 he rebuilt the structure and added a studio and second bedroom on the west side. While living in Brigus, Kent made many paintings and prints inspired by the surrounding landscape, many which include depictions of the cottage. There are still several small paintings by Kent on the cottage's interior walls and doors.

In 1930 the cottage was purchased by Albert Edward Harris, an English artist and engineer who had been employed by the Anglo-Newfoundland Development Company. An Englishman, he named the house Kent Cottage after his home county of Kent. Harris restored and expanded the cottage, and sometimes included it in his paintings. After his death in 1933, the cottage was inherited by George White. It remained vacant for twenty years until Rupert Bartlett purchased it.

In 1953 Kent Cottage was occupied by Bradley Jacob Folensbee, Jr. ("Jake"), an American artist, teacher and war veteran. Folensbee purchased the property in 1955, and named it Landfall. He spent summers at the cottage, and until his death in 2004 he invested considerably in preserving and restoring it, including acquiring surrounding land to protect its character. Folensbee bequeathed the property to the Landfall Trust, which now owns and maintains Kent Cottage and the surrounding 11 acres (4.5 ha) of land.

The cottage was designated a Registered Heritage Structure in 1988 by the Heritage Foundation of Newfoundland and Labrador.

== Modern use ==
Kent Cottage is now used for the Landfall Trust's artist-in-residence and writer-in-residence programs. It is also used for vacation rentals from May through October and is only occasionally open for public viewing.
