= Edward K. Barsky =

American surgeon and political activist

Doctor Edward K. Barsky
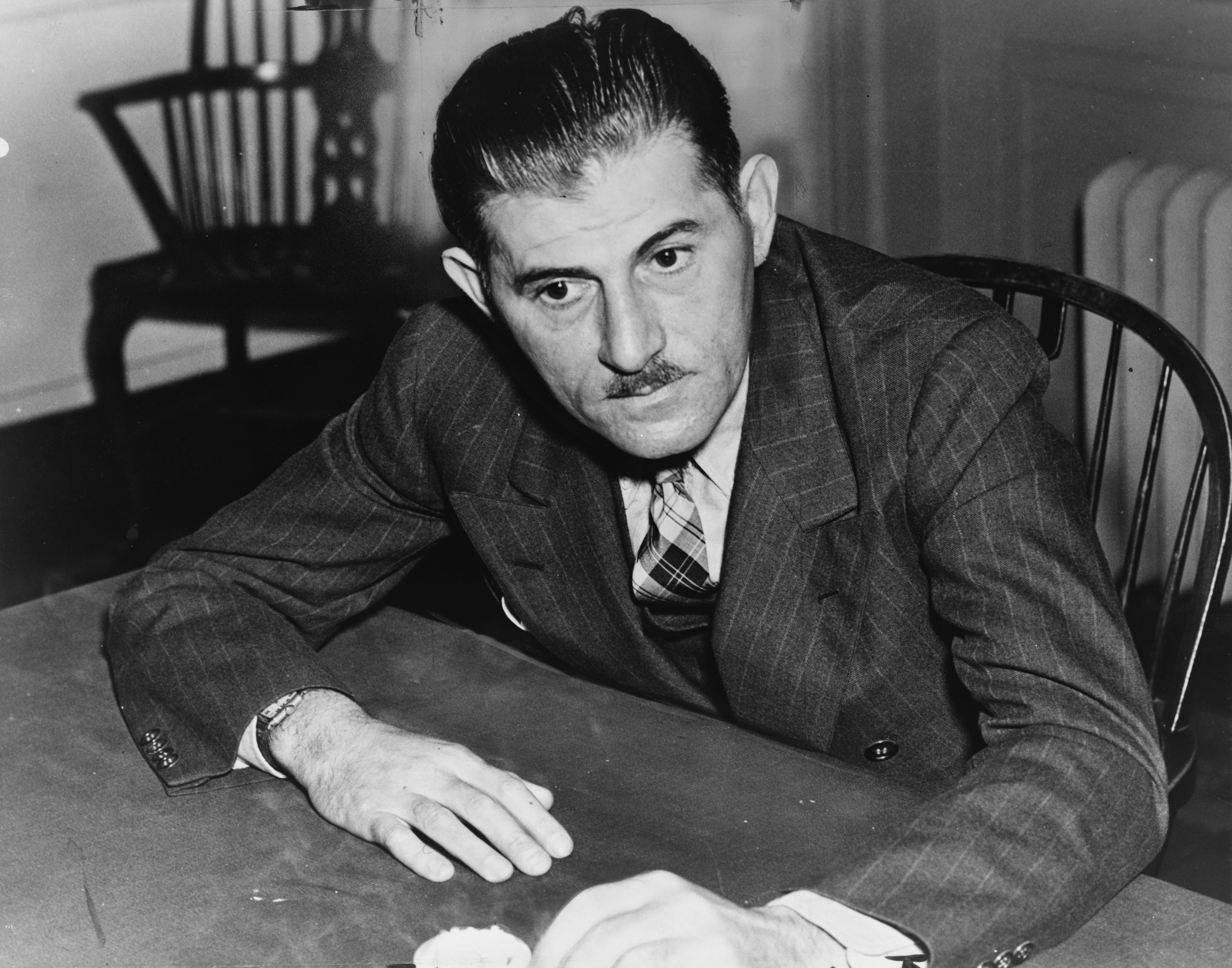
- Barsky in 1937
- Born: June 6, 1895; Manhattan, New York City, United States
- Died: February 11, 1975 (aged 79)
- Occupation: Doctor
- Years active: 1921-1975

National Chairman of the Joint Anti-Fascist Refugee Committee
- In office 1941–1955

Edward K. "Eddie" Barsky (June 6, 1895 – February 11, 1975) was an American surgeon and political activist. Barsky is best remembered as the head of the Joint Anti-Fascist Refugee Committee, a Communist Party-sponsored organization which raised funds to aid refugees from the regime of Spanish strongman Francisco Franco in the late 1930s during the Spanish Civil War. In the 1950s Barsky became a cause célèbre as a victim of McCarthyism when he was imprisoned for refusing to provide information to the House Un-American Activities Committee.

== Background ==
Edward K. Barsky, known to his friends as "Eddie," was born in Manhattan, New York City, on June 6, 1895. His father and both brothers were doctors. He attended the public schools of the city, graduating from Townsend Harris High School. He was the son of a surgeon at Beth Israel Hospital in New York City. Barsky attended City College of New York and graduated from the College of Physicians and Surgeons of Columbia University in 1919. He also studied medicine in Berlin, Vienna, and Paris.

== Career ==
In 1921, Barsky began his own internship at Beth Israel Hospital in New York City; in 1931, he was made an Associate Surgeon at Beth Israel Hospital in 1931.

=== Spanish Civil War ===
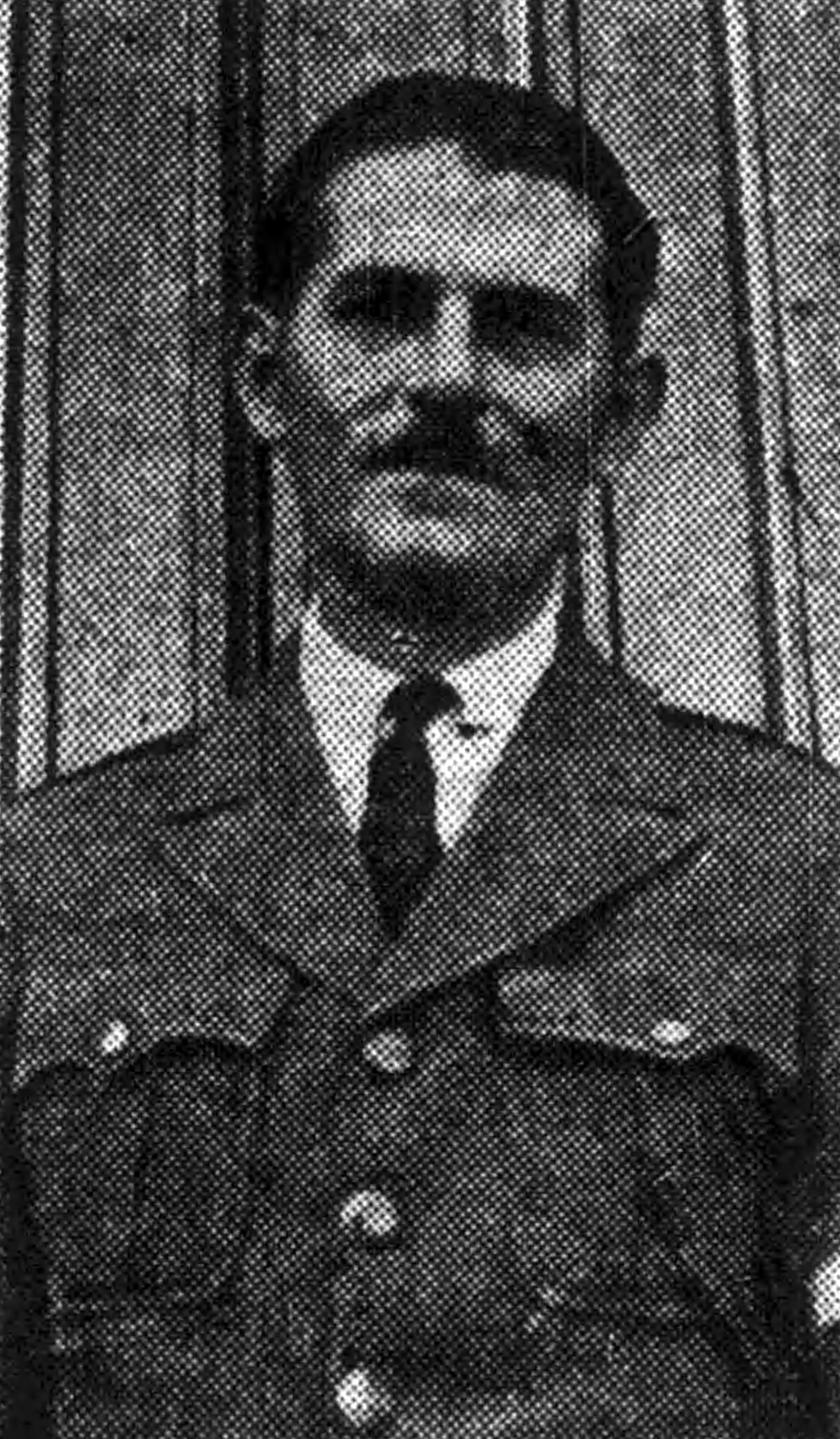
Barsky in Spain, 1937

With the outbreak civil war in Spain in 1936, Barsky left Beth El Hospital joined with a group of concerned New York physicians to establish the American Medical Bureau to Aid Spanish Democracy (AMB) -- an adjunct organization to the North America Committee to Aid Spanish Democracy, later known as the North American Committee to Aid Spanish Democracy. The AMB arranged for the shipment of ambulances and other medical equipment and supplies, and in January 1937 sent a fully outfitted medical team of doctors, nurses, and technicians to Spain with Barsky at the helm.

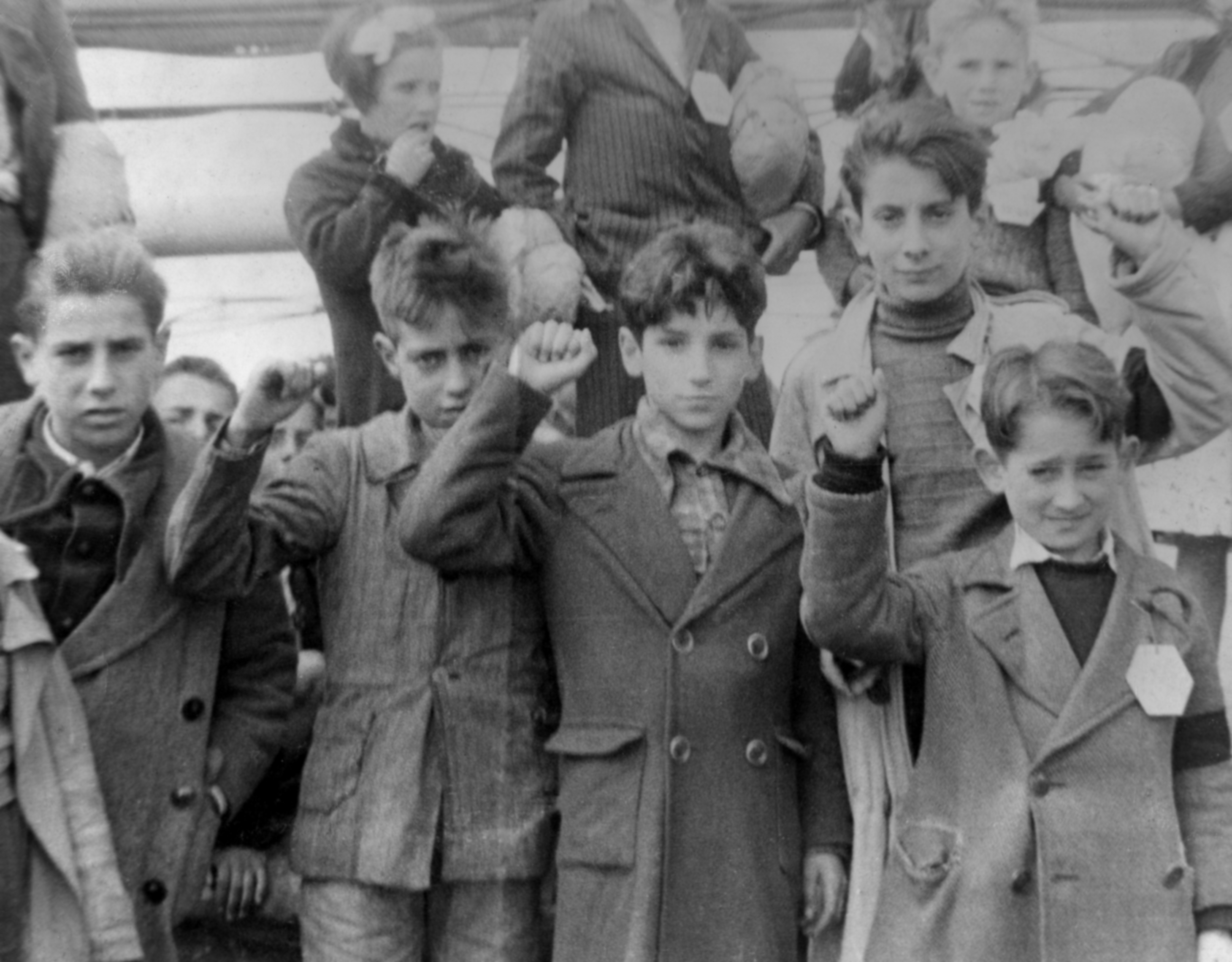
Children preparing for evacuation, some giving the Republican salute. The Republicans showed a raised fist whereas the Nationalists gave the Roman salute.

Barsky sailed for Spain on January 16, 1937, arriving early the next month with enough equipment to furnish a 50-bed hospital. There he served with the Republican Medical Service in various American Hospitals. Barsky returned to US from Spain to be appointed Surgeon General of International Sanitary Service. Supporters of his efforts included Albert Einstein, Dr. Walter B. Cannon of Harvard Medical School, and Dr. James B. Peters of Yale Medical School.

After the defeat of the Republican force, Barsky returned to the US, arriving in August 1938.

=== Postwar ===
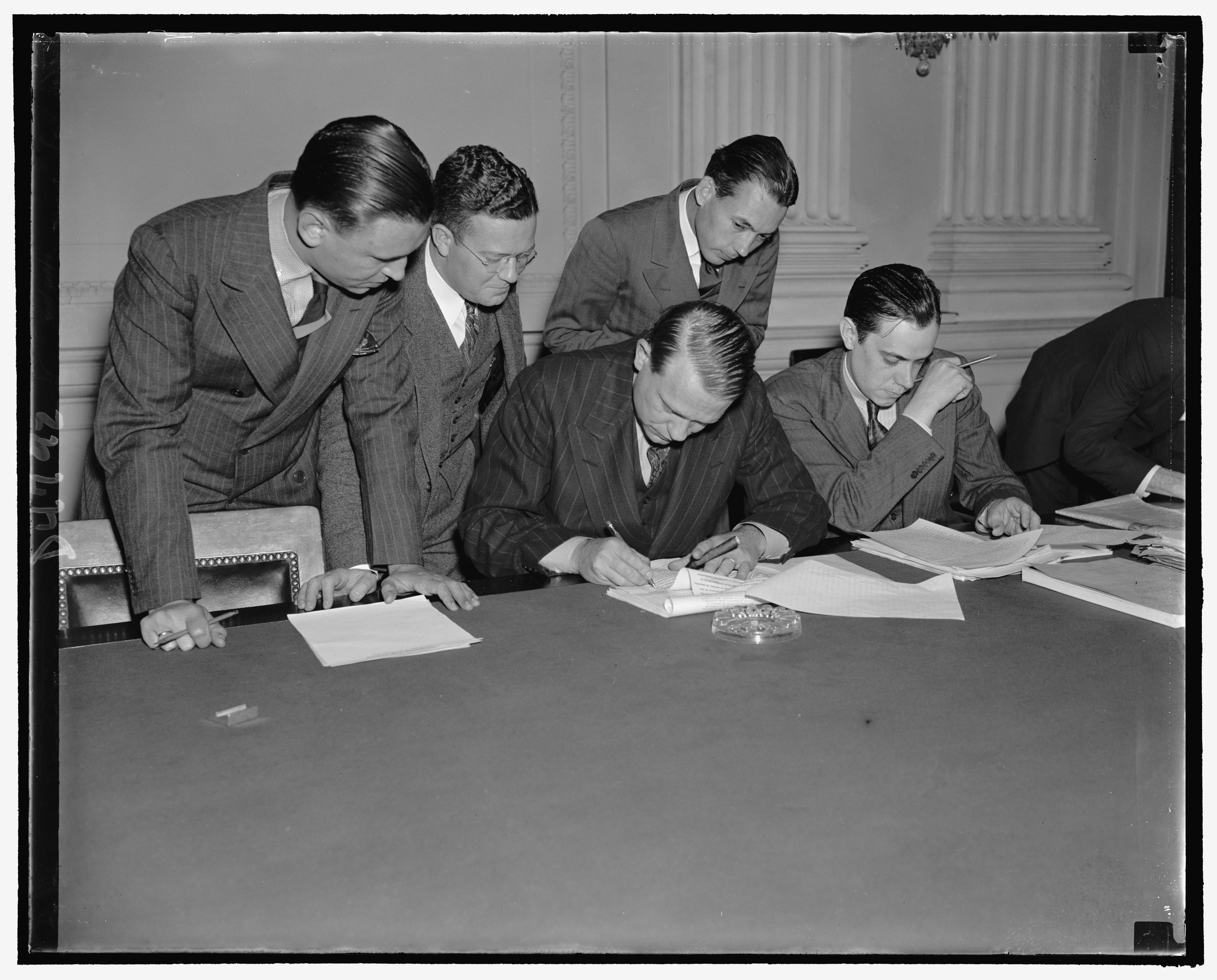
Chairman Dies of HUAC proofs his letter replying to President Roosevelt's attack on the committee, October 26, 1938

Barsky was called to testify before the House Un-American Activities Committee (HUAC) on February 13, 1946, where he refused to turn over the books, ledgers, and other financial documents of the Joint Anti-Fascist Refugee Committee, as was demanded. As a result, Barsky was charged with contempt of Congress, brought to trial for his willful defiance of Congressional subpoena, and sentenced to six months in prison. Ernest Hemingway tried to help him fight the conviction.

In 1952 he worked on behalf of the American Labor Party and its candidate for President of the United States for the Progressive Party in the 1952 presidential election, Vincent Hallinan. During the 1960s, Barsky was active with the Medical Committee for Human Rights, which provided emergency medical services for civil rights and peace movement workers in the South. He was also affiliated with the New York labor movement, working for many years as a security plan panel physician for District Council 65.

Barsky was a consulting surgeon at Beth Israel Hospital at time of death.

== Personal life and death ==
Barsky married Vita; they had a daughter.

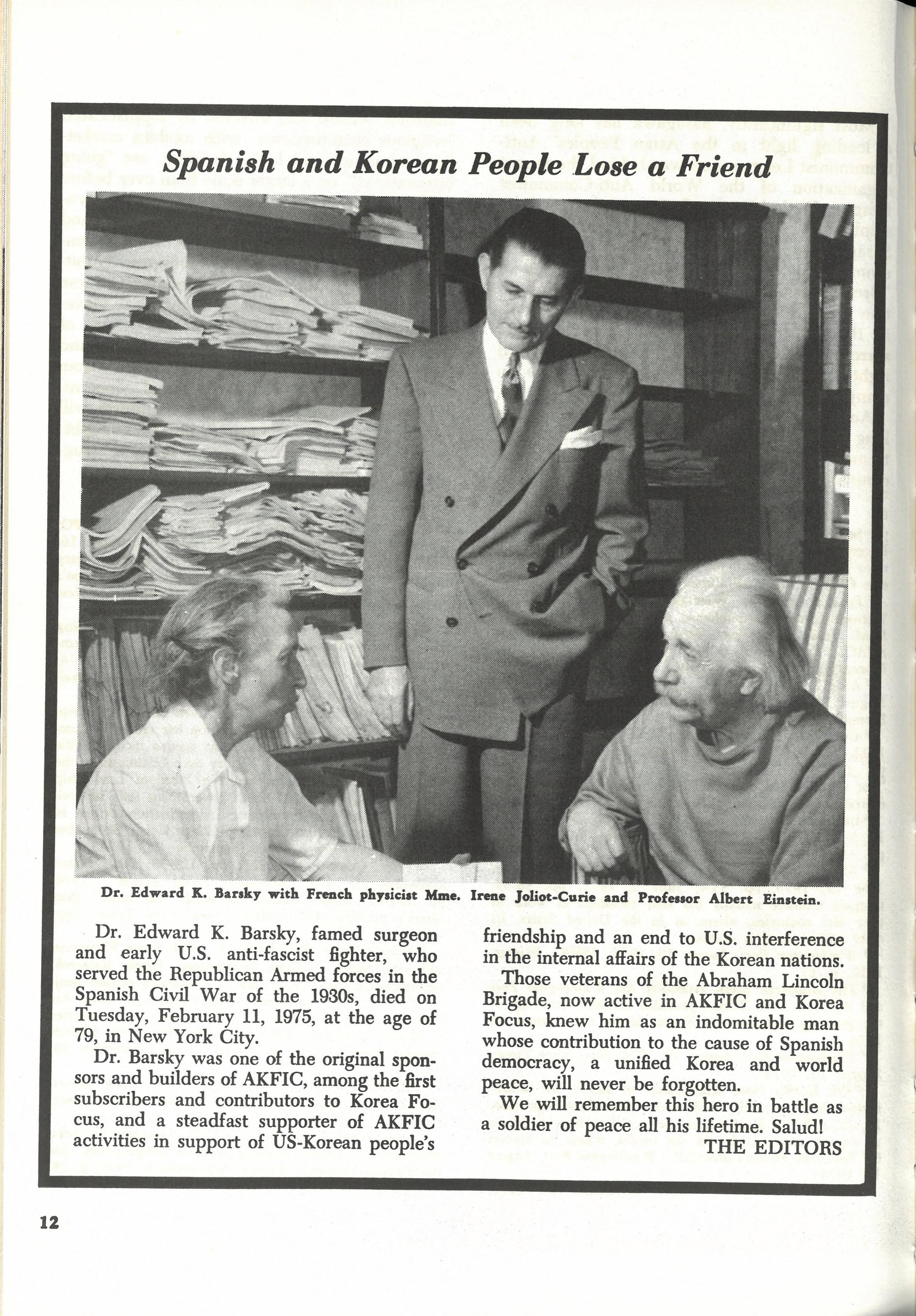
Memorial message published in Korea Focus, March-April 1975

Edward K. Barsky died age 78 on February 11, 1975, in Manhattan, New York City.

== Legacy ==
Barsky's papers are housed as part of the Abraham Lincoln Brigade Archives at Tamiment Library and Robert F. Wagner Archives at New York University in New York City. The Barsky material encompasses 2.5 linear feet of material, housed in five archival boxes, and is open to researchers without restriction. Included in this material is an undated manuscript of a memoir by Barsky entitled "Someone Had to Help."

== See also ==
- American Medical Bureau
- Veterans of the Abraham Lincoln Brigade

== Sources ==
- Photo of Barsky
- Jane Pacht Brickman, "Medical McCarthyism and the Punishment of Internationalist Physicians in the United States," in Anne-Emanuelle Birn and Theodore M. Brown (eds.), Comrades in Health: US Health Internationalists, Abroad and at Home. New Brunswick, NJ: Rutgers University Press, 2013; pp. 82–100.
- Peter N. Carroll, The Odyssey of the Abraham Lincoln Brigade: Americans in the Spanish Civil War. Stanford, CA: Stanford University Press, 1994.
- Walter J. Lear, "American Medical Support for Spanish Democracy, 1936-1938," in Anne-Emanuelle Birn and Theodore M. Brown (eds.), Comrades in Health: US Health Internationalists, Abroad and at Home. New Brunswick, NJ: Rutgers University Press, 2013; pp. 65–81.
- Joseph North, "A Case for the Doctor," New Masses, August 19, 1947, pp. 8–9.
