= Volodymyr Melnychenko =

Ukrainian artist (1932–2023)

Volodymyr Volodymyrovych Melnychenko (Ukrainian: Володимир Володимирович Мельниченко; February 25, 1932 – April 19, 2023) was a Ukrainian visual artist, sculptor, architect, Merited Artist of Ukraine, member of the National Union of Artists of Ukraine, member of the All-Ukrainian Creative Union "Congress of Writers of Ukraine", honorary member of the National Union of Cinematographers of Ukraine, honorary citizen of Naryan-Mar. Laureate of the Shevchenko National Prize in 2008.

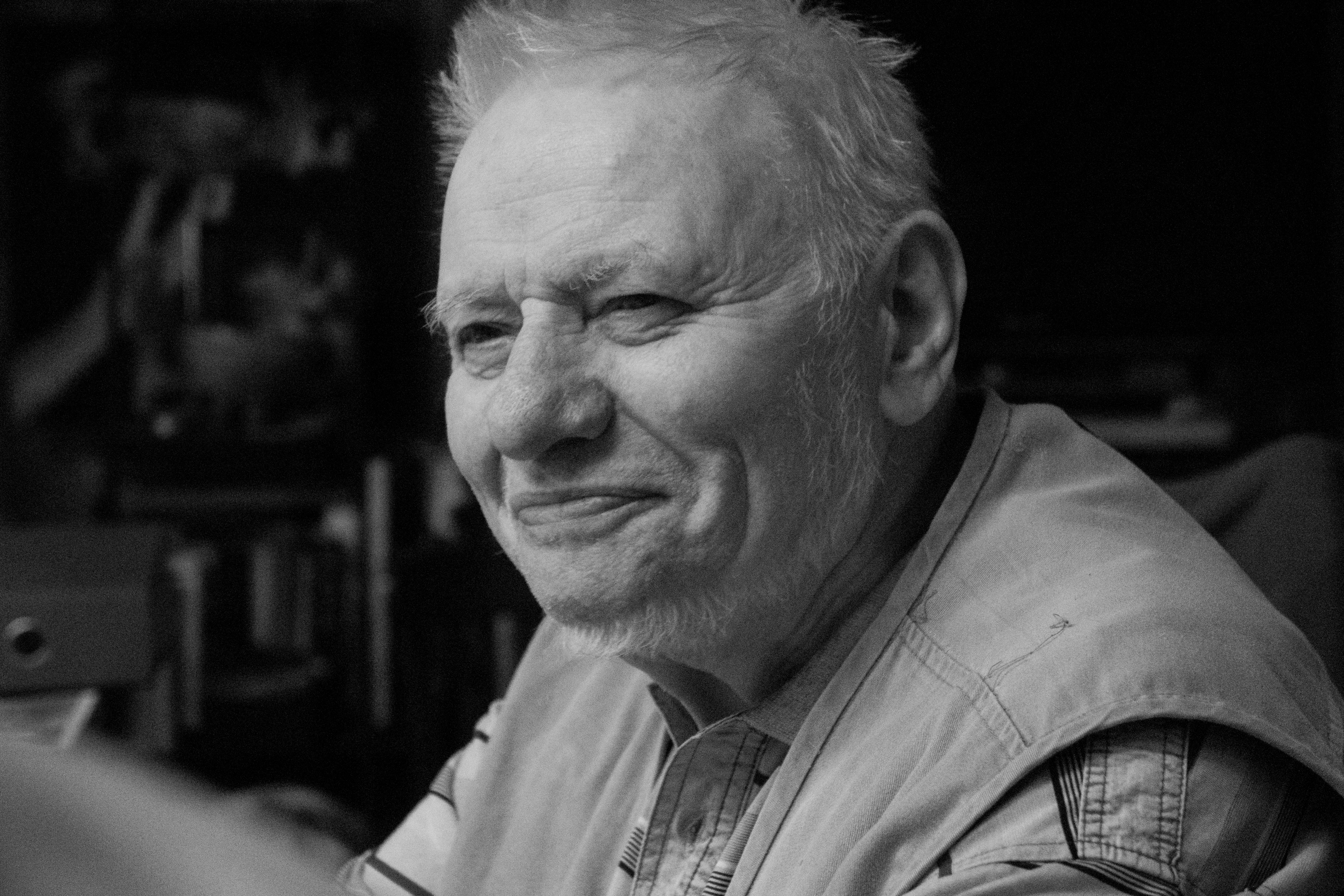
Melnychenko in 2019

Worked in architecture, sculpture, painting, graphics, monumental art: mosaic, ceramics, metal, design, plastic modeling. Author of screenplays for documentaries. Worked in art photography.

== Early life and education ==
Melnychenko was born in Kyiv on January 25, 1932. During the German occupation of Kyiv, he lived in a children's boarding school. After the war he lived with his mother, Vira Danylivna.

In 1950 he graduated from the Kyiv Art School. T. Shevchenko.

In 1951 he entered the Kyiv State Art Institute, studied in the studio in the first year of M. Sharonov, Irzhakovsky, in the third year with T. Yablonska, from the fourth - the workshop of K.D. Trokhimenko.

== Life in the Arctic ==
1954 — together with his wife Ada Rybachuk, he takes his first trip to the North, staying in May and June on the White Sea, and in July and September on the Kolguyev Island.

1955 — got the topic of diploma work approved (“Winter shore of the White Sea. Kolguyev Island”), together with Ada Rybachuk goes on the second expedition to the North, which lasted one and a half years.

1956–1957 — diploma paintings by Ada Rybachuk and Volodymyr Melnychenko (the painting "September 1", donated to a museum in Naryan-Mar in 1959) were painted on Kolguyev Island.

1957 — participation with his paintings of the 6th World Festival of Youth and Students in Moscow. A. Rybachuk — silver prize, painting "Shipboy", V. Melnychenko — "Ada. Tea Island".

=== Meeting with Rockwell Kent ===
Rockwell Kent traveled to the Soviet Union and found like-minded people there. In the preface to the second Russian edition of his book "Salamina", Kent wrote:

"Recently… I’ve met two talented young artists from Kyiv, Ada Rybachuk and Volodymyr Melnychenko. They lived and worked in the Soviet Arctic, just like me, they love the North and its inhabitants… Shouldn't art reveal the essence of Humanity? .. We who strive to create a better world for people must know the clay from which we form man."

== Art ==
Volodymyr Melnychenko worked in a creative tandem with Ada Rybachuk. All joint works - monumental works, architecture, sculpture and films - were signed with the abbreviation ARVM.

The most famous works of Ada Rybachuk and Volodymyr Melnychenko:

- Central Bus Station (Kyiv, 1960): design, color sculpture, decorative and monumental works, sketches of fabrics 1961-1962.
- Palace of Children and Youth (Kyiv, 1963–1968): design, elements of landscaping, monumental works - mosaics in the hall of aesthetic education of children, "Children of the World" "Magic Violin" (dedicated to Maria Pryimachenko)
- "Flower of Fire" is a sculptural sculpture of the composition "Torch", a decorative relief made of colored concrete. Area 33 square meters.

== Death ==
Melnychenko died in Kyiv on April 19, 2023, at the age of 91.
