= Ada Rybachuk =

Ukrainian artist

- Born: 27 June 1931; Kyiv, Ukrainian SSR
- Died: 22 September 2010 (aged 79); Kyiv, Ukraine
- Occupation: Artist
- Known for: Murals
- Spouse: Volodymyr Melnychenko

Ada Fedorivna Rybachuk (27 June 1931 – 22 September 2010) was a Ukrainian muralist, painter, sculptor and architect, Honored Artist of Ukraine, member of the National Union of Artists of Ukraine, honorary member of the National Union of Cinematographers of Ukraine, honorary citizen of Naryan-Mar. She worked closely with her husband Volodymyr Melnychenko.

== Biography ==
=== Childhood and education ===
Rybachuk was born in 1931 in Kyiv. Fedir Rybachuk, Ada's father, personnel officer for the Soviet army, went through the war from the first day to the last one. The rest of the family had to evacuate to Kazakhstan, where Ada finished elementary school. Studied at the Taras Shevchenko Art High School in Kyiv, graduated with the highest honours receiving a gold medal. She studied at the Kiev State Art Institute, which was led by Oleksii Shovkunenko.

Along with other students, takes part in a summer internship led by Sergei Grosh in Vylkove, located at the delta of Dunai. Sketches created there were shown at the student exhibition, which resulted in the first art order – the creation of illustrations for Dmitry Mamin-Sibiryak's book “Reindeer Fairy Tales”, published the same year by the Youth Publishing House.

=== Art ===
Since 1954 after her first trip to the North, Ada Rybachuk and her artistic partner and her husband Volodymyr Melnychenko have made several long trips to the North. In general, the artists lived and worked in the North, at intervals, about 7 years. During this time they created many graphic series and linocuts, illustrations for children's books on the beauty of Arctic nature and human life in the North.

In 1957 Rybachuk completed a sculpture, Shipboy, which shows a youth leaning from a rope ladder as if looking out to sea from a ship. That year she was awarded the silver medal at the 6th World Festival of Youth and Students.

Rybachuk, Melnychenko and the architect Avraam Miletsky began work on a Park of Memory in Kyiv. The Park of Memory was at the local crematorium at Baykoy Hill. The artwork covered 2,000 square metres (22,000 ft^{2}) and involved several huge sculptures. Rybachuk and Melnychenko's artwork was covered in concrete in 1982 by the authorities and was reported because of the size of this piece of censorship by the authorities. In 1988 Israel Goldstein made a documentary The Wall about their predicament and their campaign to have their work restored.

Rybachuk and her husband worked in a wide range of media, including their work at the Palace of Children and Youth in Slavy Square and the Central Bus Station in Kyiv.

=== Meeting with Rockwell Kent ===
Rockwell Kent traveled to the Soviet Union and found like-minded people there. In the preface to the second Russian edition of the book "Salamina" he wrote:

"Recently… I’ve met two talented young artists from Kyiv Ada Rybachuk and Volodymyr Melnychenko. They lived and worked in the Soviet Arctic, just like me, they love the North and its inhabitants… Shouldn't art reveal the essence of Humanity?... We who strive to create a better world for people must know the clay from which we form man."

== Exhibitions ==
- Czechoslovakia (1957)
- United Arab Republic (1958)
- Finland, Hungary, Yugoslavia (1961)
- Italy (1962)
- Iraq (1963)
- Afghanistan (1964)
- Poland (1967)
- Norway (1993)
- USA (1977, 1995)

=== Memory ===
Ada Rybachuk died in 2010 in Kyiv.

In 2013 Volodymyr Melnychenko created an exhibition of A. Rybachuk's works at the National Academy of Visual Arts and Architecture in Kyiv.

In 2019 there was an exhibition of her work from the 1950s to the 1970s featuring images completed with her husband. The designs were inspired by childhood and the exhibition was called Island. The island represents the gulf between youth and adulthood and between the artist and their censors.

== Literature ==
- Rybachuk A., Melnychenko V. The Cry of the Bird. II: Fragments. Kyiv: ADEF-Ukraine, 2000. P. 53.
- N. Horova. (2015). Artwork of the first “non-conformists” of the 1950s Ada Rybachuk and Volodymyr Melnychenko. Historiographic and source basis. Hudozhnia kultura. Aktualni problemy: research journal. Modern Art Research Institute of Ukrainian Academy of Arts. Issue 11. Kyiv, Feniks publ., pp. 84–95. (in Ukrainian)
