= Walter Lear =

American physician and social justice activist

Doctor Walter Jay Lear
- Born: May 4, 1923; Brooklyn, New York, United States
- Died: May 10, 2010 (aged 87); Philadelphia, Pennsylvania, United States
- Education: Harvard University (B.S., 1943); Long Island College of Medicine (M.D., 1946); Columbia University (M.S., 1948)
- Occupations: Physician; Public health official
- Years active: 1940s to early 2000s
- Known for: Advocacy for progressive health issues Advocacy for LGBT rights
- Medical career
- Field: Public health
- Institutions: Institute of Social Medicine and Community Health (founder)
- Awards: Helen Rodriguez-Trias Award for Social Justice

Walter Jay Lear (May 4, 1923 – May 29, 2010) was an American physician and activist for healthcare reform and LGBT rights. Among his contributions, Lear was a founder of the Institute of Social Medicine and Community Health and the Maternity Care Coalition of Greater Philadelphia. In 1964 Lear was also a founder of the Medical Community for Human Rights. He received the American Public Health Association's Helen Rodriguez-Trias Award for his contributions to the cause of social justice.

== Early life and education ==
Lear was born in Brooklyn, New York, on May 4, 1923. He attended Harvard University, then known as Harvard College, where he earned a bachelor of science degree in 1943. He subsequently completed his medical degree at the Long Island College of Medicine in 1946. Lear completed his M.D. with the aid of the Army Specialized Training Program during World War II. He also earned a master of science in hospital administration at Columbia University in 1948. Lear's training in hospital administration included field work at the Montefiore Medical Center.

== Career ==
=== Public health ===
Following completion of his formal education, Lear worked for the United States Public Health Service. In 1964, he moved to Philadelphia to become the city's first deputy health commissioner. He served in this role until 1971.

During the course of his career, Lear held a variety of public health positions, including regional health commissioner for the Pennsylvania Department of Health and director of the Philadelphia General Hospital. He was appointed to these positions by Philadelphia Mayor James Tate. Lear also was appointed in 1971 by Governor Milton Shapp as State Regional Health Commissioner.

During his tenure as a public health official, Lear campaigned for a City of Philadelphia law that would ban discrimination against people because of their sexual orientation, ultimately resulting in passage of the city's Gay Rights Bill in 1982.

Lear's public service roles extended beyond public health. In 1984, Philadelphia Mayor Wilson Goode appointed Lear to the Philadelphia Human Relations Commission.

=== Social justice ===
External media
- Media related to Walter J. Lear
- Photograph of Walter Lear, courtesy of the Philadelphia Gay News

Lear was one of the founders of the Maternity Care Coalition and Physicians for Social Responsibility. Even late in life, from his retirement home, he founded the Institute for Community Health and Social Medicine which monitors progress of health activism and assists community organizers. Through much of his career, Lear mentored many young activists in advancing their social justice causes.

Lear was a founder of the Medical Committee for Human Rights. As part of his efforts on this committee, he was one of 30 doctors who picketed the 1963 conference of the American Medical Association in Atlantic City, New Jersey, protesting the organization's segregationist policies of the time. This protest resulted in significant media attention for Lear.

=== LGBT advocacy ===
Lear advocated for a large number of organizations dedicated to the advancement of LGBTQ rights. Among these, Lear was a co-founder of the Gay and Lesbian Community Center, which later became known as the William Way Center. He was additionally a co-founder of the Philadelphia AIDS Task Force and the Maternity Care Coalition of Greater Philadelphia. Lear was an organizer of the first national conference on AIDS in the 1980s.

After speaking at an LGBTQ+ event at University of Pennsylvania in 1975 that celebrated the inspiring life of Howard Brown, an impactful LGBTQ+ activist, Walter Lear himself publicly and proudly came out of the closet, declaring himself gay. Although he was already known to be gay doctor by his close friends and family, Lear had never publicly announced it before. Lear had been experiencing inner turmoil and conflict about whether he should reveal himself and his identity because of the social context of the time where such a controversial announcement was uncommon. After some internal and emotional reflection, he ultimately realized he was truly passionate about fighting for the equal rights and treatment of those in the LGBTQ+ community. From then, Lear was one of the first openly gay people to hold public offices in the city and state as the commissioner of health for Southeastern Pennsylvania. His career as a gay activist jumpstarted after his life-changing moment at the event at UPenn. In fact, he even founded Gay Caucus of the American Public Health Association that same year. His actions encouraged many other doctors who were in the same position as Lear to be confident in themselves.

Lear's interest in helping others originates back in the 1950s when he started advocating for his patients’ healthcare rights and racial justice. Lear helped found and launch a multitude of organizations such as the Penguin Place, Lavender Health Project, Delaware Valley Legacy Fund, Philadelphia AIDS Task Force, the local chapter of the Radical Faeries, but arguably most well known for the Medical Committee for Human Rights. Furthermore, Lear inadvertently became a national icon when a photo of him was taken when he went on strike against an American Medical Association conference in Atlantic City. He protested their segregationist policies and increased general public awareness of the unfair rules and regulations that targeted marginalized groups. Lear strongly emphasized the need for better health care for everyone, but especially better medical treatment for gays. He was one of the earliest advocates to push for a public health system that would guarantee health-insurance coverage for all citizens of the United States of America.

Another one of his most famous organizations was the Institute for Community Health and Social Medicine. As an agency that worked to chronicle the progress of health activism and offer guidance to other organizers of advocacy events, the Institute for Community Health and Social Medicine aimed to combine the work of social historians and community activists into a living collection and conglomeration of evidence. Lear guided and shaped this organization into being a special kind of documentation of the real time developments, progression, and radical changes, ensuring that social movements, but specifically healthcare reform for minority groups, had a solid historical foundation. His dream was to have future healthcare activists look back upon his collection and learn from the useful lessons in the past. His archived compilation of books, pamphlets, photos, interviews and other historical recordings of health activism, which is now housed at the University of Pennsylvania Library, keeps his memory and activism sentiments alive.

Eventually, Walter Lear died on May 29, 2010, due to multiple myeloma. However, his name lives on as Lear dedicated his life to fighting in the name of the poor and the persecuted, the sick and the scorned.

== Personal life ==
Lear was married to opera singer Evelyn Lear from 1945 to 1952, with whom he had two children. Later, Lear's life partner was James F. Payne, a relationship that began in 1953 and continued until the time of Lear's death.

Lear publicly disclosed that he was gay in 1975. He subsequently stated that he likely would have never received his public health appointments for government service had he been openly gay. Although there was initial controversy after Lear's disclosure, he received strong support from fellow physicians.

Lear reported that his interest in medical activism dated to 1943 when he attended presentations in New York City by Morris Fishbein, of the Postwar Planning Committee of the American Medical Association, and J. Peters, of the Physicians' Committee to Improve Medical Practice. These presentations addressed the state of medical care in the United States at that time.

Lear was a competitive amateur swimmer, having competed in the 75–80 age bracket in swimming at the Gay Olympics.

== Death ==
Lear died of kidney failure as a complication of multiple myeloma. At the time of his death, he was living in the Powelton Village neighborhood of Philadelphia and had been in hospice care.

== Honors and legacy ==
In 2006, Lear received the Helen Rodriguez Trias Social Justice Award, presented by the American Public Health Association, which is given to those who have worked for social justice of the disadvantaged population.

Late in his life, Lear increasingly turned his attention to the documentation of the history of medicine. He established fellowships on this subject through the U.S. Health Left History Center.

Lear established the U.S. Health Activism History Collection, which is housed at the University of Pennsylvania library, as of the time of Lear's death. The scope of the collection includes holdings on: health care and policy, medical reform efforts, poverty, civil rights, and women's health, and other special topics. The School of Nursing at the University of Pennsylvania also maintains a collection of Lear's papers and correspondence from the time period 1944 to 1964.

The William Way LGBT Community Center maintains a collection of papers and correspondence from Walter Lear's career for the period 1975 to 1996.
