= Rockwell Kent =

American artist (1882–1971)

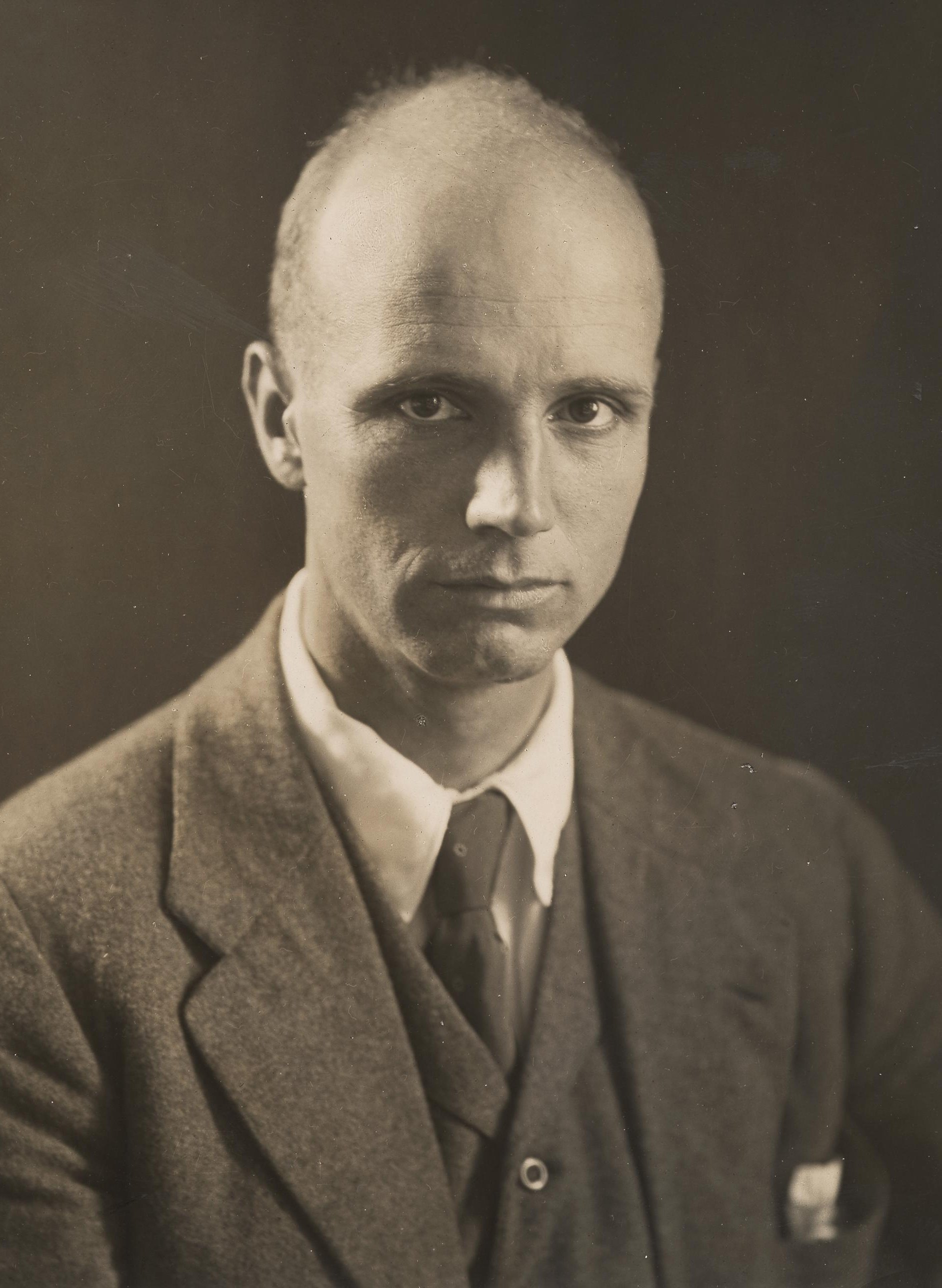
- Kent c. 1920
- Born: June 21, 1882; Tarrytown, New York, US
- Died: March 13, 1971 (aged 88); Plattsburgh, New York, US
- Known for: Painting, printmaking, illustration, adventures
- Awards: Lenin Peace Prize

Rockwell Kent (June 21, 1882 – March 13, 1971) was an American painter, printmaker, illustrator, writer, sailor, adventurer and voyager.

== Biography ==
Rockwell Kent was born in Tarrytown, New York. Kent was of English descent. He lived much of his early life in and around New York City, where he attended the Horace Mann School. Kent studied with several influential painters and theorists of his day. He studied composition and design with Arthur Wesley Dow at the Art Students League in the fall of 1900, and he studied painting with William Merritt Chase each of the three summers between 1900 and 1902 at the Shinnecock Hills Summer School of Art, after which he entered in the fall of 1902 Robert Henri's class at the New York School of Art, which Chase had founded. During the summer of 1903, in Dublin, New Hampshire, Kent was apprenticed to painter and naturalist Abbott Handerson Thayer. An undergraduate background in architecture at Columbia University prepared Kent for occasional work in the 1900s and 1910s as an architectural renderer and carpenter. At Columbia, Kent befriended future curator Carl Zigrosser, who became his close friend, supporter, and collaborator.

Kent's early paintings of Mount Monadnock and New Hampshire were first shown at the Society of American Artists in New York in 1904, when Dublin Pond was purchased by Smith College. In 1905 Kent ventured to Monhegan Island, Maine, and found its rugged and primordial beauty a source of inspiration for the next five years. His first series of paintings of Monhegan were shown to wide critical acclaim in 1907 at Clausen Galleries in New York. These works form the foundation of his lasting reputation as an early American modernist, and can be seen in museums across the country, including the Metropolitan Museum of Art, Seattle Art Museum, New Britain Museum of American Art, and the Fine Arts Museums of San Francisco. Among those critics lauding Kent was James Huneker of the Sun, who praised Kent's athletic brushwork and daring color dissonances. (It was Huneker who deemed the paintings of The Eight as "decidedly reactionary".) In 1910, Kent helped organize the Exhibition of Independent Artists, and in 1911, together with Arthur B. Davies he organized An Independent Exhibition of the Paintings and Drawings of Twelve Men, referred to as "The Twelve" and "Kent's Tent". Painters Marsden Hartley, John Marin, and Max Weber (but not John Sloan, Robert Henri, or George Bellows) participated in the 1911 exhibition. Kent was away in Winona, Minnesota, on an architectural assignment when the historic Armory Show took place in Manhattan in 1913.

A transcendentalist and mystic in the tradition of Thoreau and Emerson, whose works he read, Kent found inspiration in the austerity and stark beauty of wilderness. After Monhegan, he lived for extended periods of time in Winona, Minnesota (1912–1913), Newfoundland (1914–15), Alaska (1918–19), Vermont (1919–1925), Tierra del Fuego (1922–23), Ireland (1926), and Greenland (1929; 1931–32; 1934–35). His series of land and seascapes from these often forbidding locales convey the Symbolist spirit evoking the mysteries and cosmic wonders of the natural world. "I don't want petty self-expression", Kent wrote, "I want the elemental, infinite thing; I want to paint the rhythm of eternity."

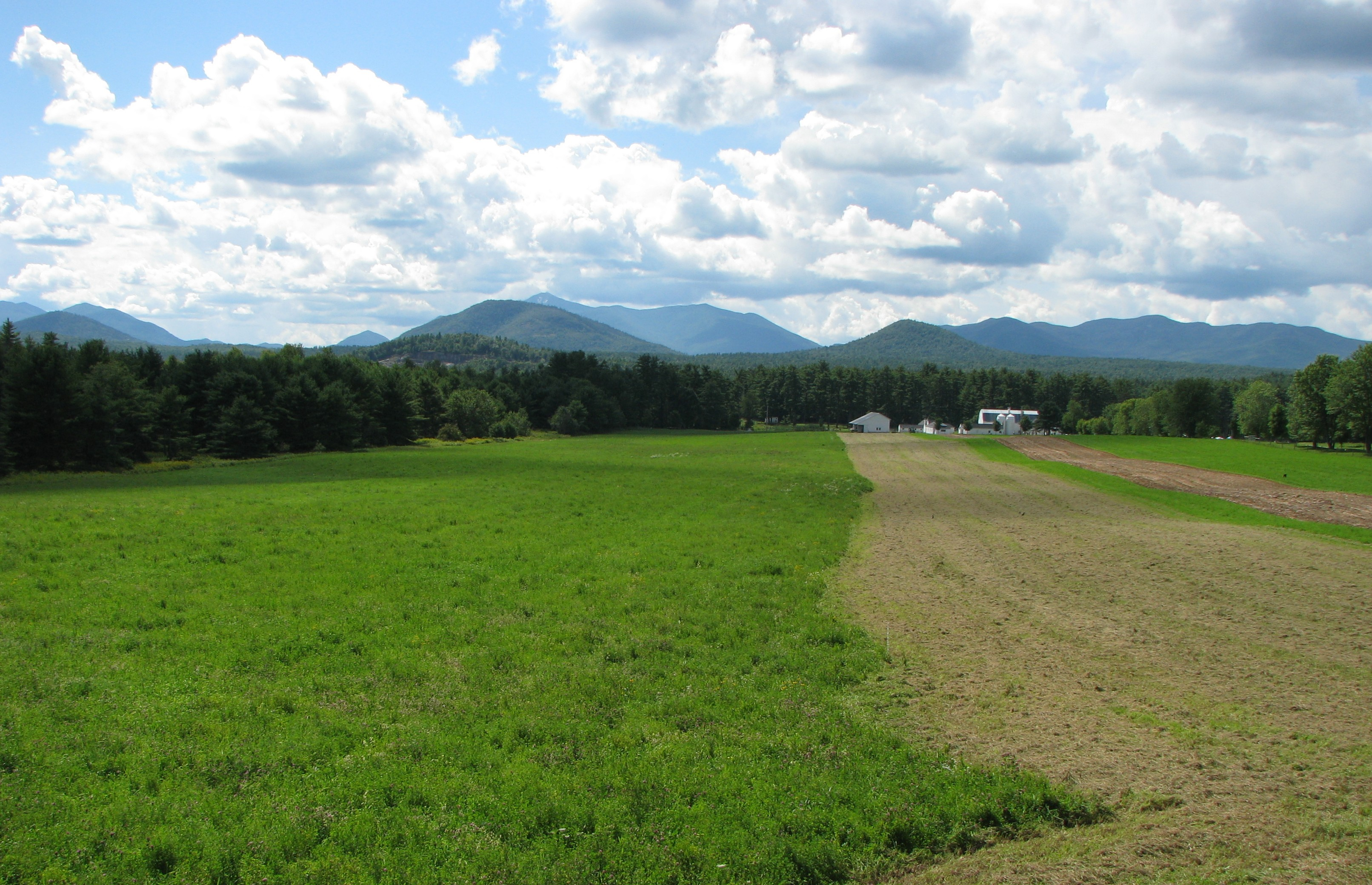
Asgaard Farm, Mountain Road, Jay, New York "And there, westward and heavenward, to the high ridge of Whiteface northward to the northern limit of the mountains, southward to their highest peaks, was spread the full half-circle panorama of the Adirondacks. It was as if we had never seen the mountains before." —This Is My Own, Rockwell Kent.

In the late summer of 1918, Kent and his nine-year-old son ventured to the American frontier of Alaska. Wilderness (1920), the first of Kent's several adventure memoirs, is an edited and illustrated compilation of his letters home. The New Statesman (London) described Wilderness as "easily the most remarkable book to come out of America since Leaves of Grass was published." Upon the artist's return to New York in March 1919, publishing scion George Palmer Putnam and others, including Juliana Force—assistant to Gertrude Vanderbilt Whitney—incorporated the artist as "Rockwell Kent, Inc." to support him in his new Vermont homestead while he completed his paintings from Alaska for exhibition in 1920 at Knoedler Galleries in New York. Kent's small oil-on-wood-panel sketches from Alaska—uniformly horizontal studies of light and color—were exhibited at Knoedler's as "Impressions." Their artistic lineage to the small and spare oil sketches of James Abbott McNeill Whistler (1834–1903), which are often entitled "Arrangements," underscores Kent's admiration of Whistler's genius.

Approached in 1926 by publisher R. R. Donnelley to produce an illustrated edition of Richard Henry Dana Jr.'s Two Years Before the Mast, Kent suggested Moby-Dick instead. Published in 1930 by the Lakeside Press of Chicago, the three-volume limited edition (1,000 copies) filled with Kent's haunting black-and-white pen/brush and ink drawings sold out immediately; Random House also produced a trade edition.

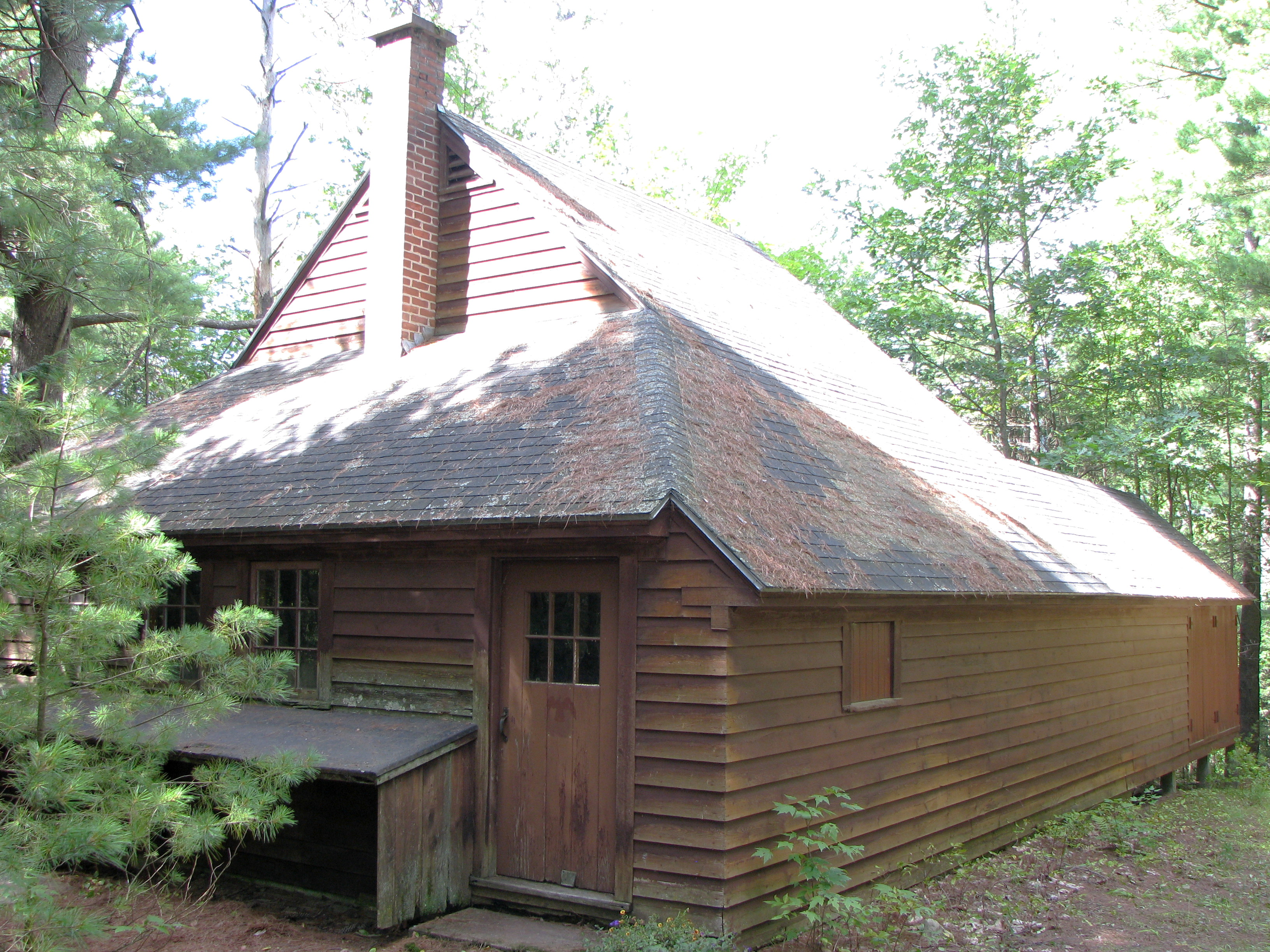
Kent's studio at Asgaard Farm, Au Sable Forks, New York

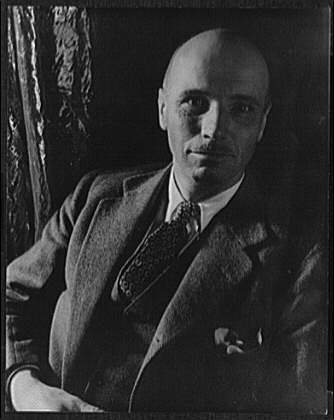
Rockwell Kent photographed by Carl Van Vechten, 1933

Less well known are Kent's talents as a Jazz Age humorist. As the pen-and-ink draftsman "Hogarth Jr.," Kent created dozens of whimsical and smartly irreverent drawings published by Vanity Fair, New York Tribune, Harper's Weekly, and the original Life. He also brought his Hogarth Jr., style to a series of richly colored reverse paintings on glass that he completed in 1918 and exhibited at Wanamaker's Department Store. (Two of these glass paintings are in the collection of the Columbus Museum of Art, part of the bequest of modernist collector Ferdinand Howald.) In Rockwell Kent: The Mythic and the Modern, Jake Milgram Wien devotes an entire chapter to Hogarth Jr. and reproduces several of the ink drawings and reverse paintings on glass. Kent frequently crossed into the realm of illustration in the 1920s and contributed drawings for reproduction on the covers of many leading magazines. For example, Kent's pen, brush, and ink drawings were reproduced on the covers of the pulp magazine Adventure in 1927, leading Time magazine to say that "if it were distinguished for nothing else, Adventure would stand apart from rival 'pulps' ... because it was once entirely illustrated by Rockwell Kent ..." Decorative work ensued intermittently: in 1939, Vernon Kilns reproduced three series of designs drawn by Kent (Moby Dick, Salamina, Our America) on its sets of contemporary china dinnerware.

At the Art Students League in the 1920s or 1930s, Kent met and befriended many artists, including Wilhelmina Weber Furlong and Thomas Furlong.

Raymond Moore, founder and impresario of the Cape Playhouse and Cinema in Dennis, Massachusetts, contracted with Rockwell Kent for the design of murals for the cinema—including an extraordinarily expansive mural for the ceiling. The work of transferring and painting the designs on the 6,400-square-foot (590 m^{2}) span was done by Kent's collaborator Jo Mielziner (1901–1976) and a crew of stage set painters from New York City. Ostensibly staying away from the state of Massachusetts to protest the Sacco and Vanzetti executions of 1927, Kent did in fact venture to Dennis in June 1930 to spend three days on the scaffolding, making suggestions and corrections. The signatures of both Kent and Mielziner appear on opposite walls of the cinema.

In 1927, Kent moved to upstate New York where he had acquired an Adirondack farmstead. Asgaard, as he named it, was his residence for the remainder of his life, and from his studio there he worked tirelessly on countless painting and drawing assignments. In the summer of 1929, Kent sailed on a painting expedition to Greenland, and his adventures (and misadventures) are recounted in the best-selling N by E (1930). After meeting Danish Arctic explorers Peter Freuchen and Knud Rasmussen on this trip, Kent determined to return to Greenland to paint and write. He spent two years (1931–32 and 1934–35) above the Arctic Circle in a tiny fishing settlement called Igdlorssuit (or Illorsuit), where he conceived some of the largest and most celebrated paintings of his career. His cross-cultural encounters in Greenland included Leni Riefenstahl, the famed German filmmaker/actor, who was briefly in Illorsuit with the film crew of S.O.S. Iceberg. Kent's own movie-making aspirations, including a quasi-documentary film featuring the Inuit, are explored in Rockwell Kent and Hollywood (Jake Milgram Wien, 2002), cited below. Many of Kent's historic photographs and hand-tinted lantern slides are reproduced for the first time in North by Nuuk: Greenland after Rockwell Kent (Denis Defibaugh, 2019), also cited below.

As World War II approached, Kent shifted his artistic agenda, becoming increasingly active in progressive politics. In 1937, the Section of Painting and Sculpture of the U.S. Treasury commissioned Kent, along with nine other artists, to paint two murals in the New Post Office building at the Federal Triangle in Washington, DC; the two murals are named "Mail Service in the Arctic" and "Mail Service in the Tropics" to celebrate the reach of domestic airborne postal service. Kent included (in an Alaska Native language and in tiny letters) a polemical statement in the painting, apparently a message from the indigenous people of Alaska to the Puerto Ricans, in support of decolonization. As translated, the communication read "To the peoples of Puerto Rico, our friends: Go ahead, let us change chiefs. That alone can make us equal and free". The incident caused some consternation.

Kent's patriotism never waned in spite of his often critical views of American foreign policy and his impatience with the promises of capitalism. He remained America's premier draftsman of the sea, and during World War II he produced a series of pen/brush and ink maritime drawings for American Export Lines and began another series of pen/brush and ink drawings for Rahr Malting Company which he completed in 1946. The drawings were reproduced in To Thee!, a book Kent also wrote and designed celebrating American freedom and democracy and the important role immigrants play in constructing American national identity. In 1948, Kent was elected to the National Academy of Design as an Associate member, and in 1966 he became a full Academician. Kent died at his home in the Adirondacks in 1971.

== Politics ==
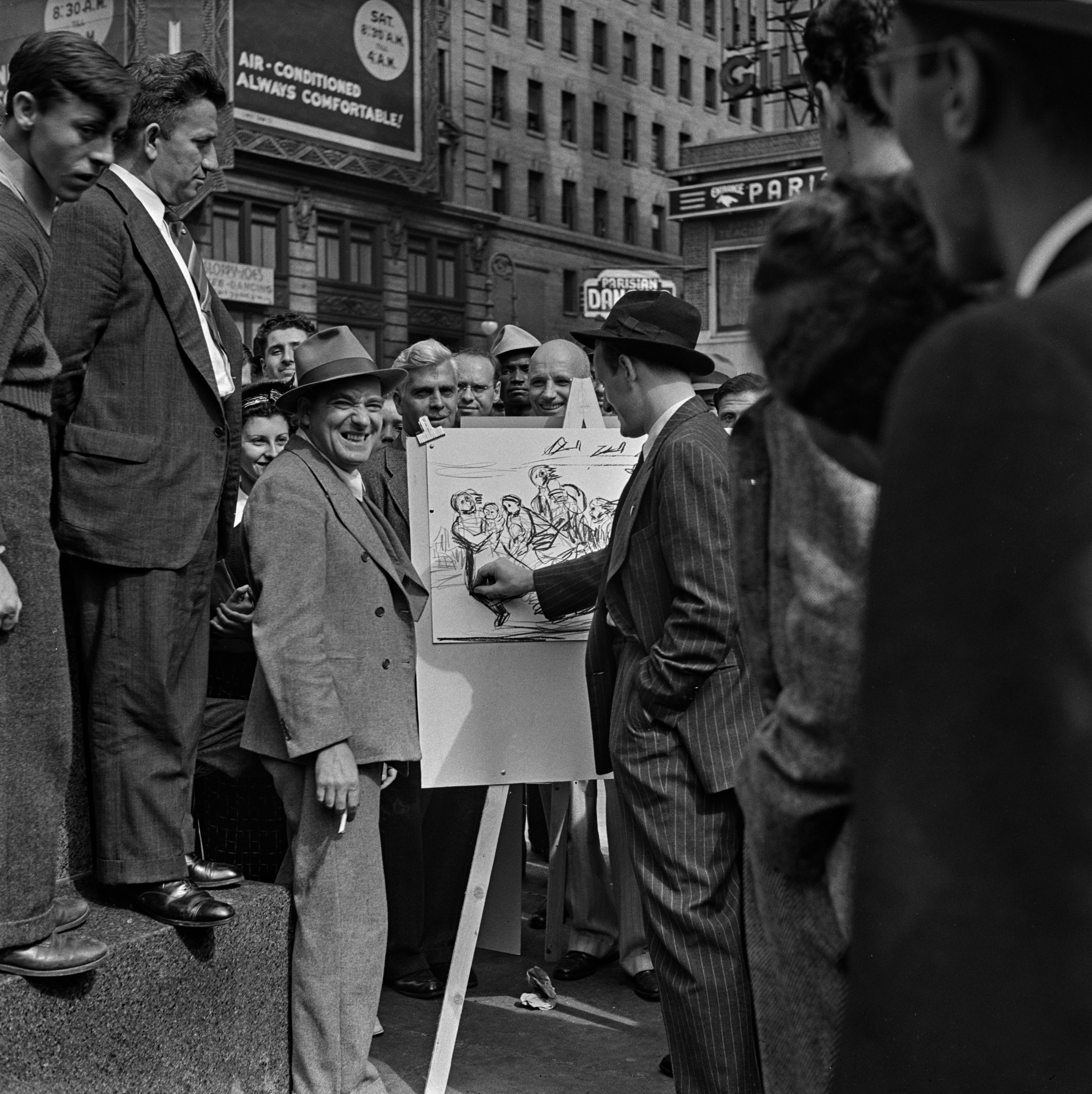
Jacob Burck draws in Times Square, New York to raise money for the Loyalists in the Spanish Civil War, 1938. Behind the canvas, left to right: William Gropper, Fred Ellis, Rockwell Kent.

Although he came from a relatively privileged background, Kent formed radical political views early in life, joining the Socialist Party of America in 1904. He cast his first presidential vote for Eugene Debs that year, and for the rest of his life was ready to debate socialist ideas on any occasion. His respect for the dignity of labor, acquired through personal experience and the skills of his craft, also made him a strong supporter of unions. He briefly joined the Industrial Workers of the World in 1912 and belonged at various times to unions in the American Federation of Labor and the Congress of Industrial Organizations.

Kent's political activism came to the fore in the latter part of the 1930s, when he took part in several initiatives of the cultural popular front, including support for the Spanish Republic and the subsequent war against fascism. Most notably, he participated in the American Artists' Congress at the time of its formation in 1936 and later served as an officer of the Artists' Union of America and then the Artists' League of America in their efforts to represent artists to boards, museums and dealers. In 1948 he stood for Congress as an American Labor Party candidate supporting Henry Wallace's Progressive Party presidential campaign as the best option for extending the legacy of the New Deal.

In the changing postwar context, Kent advocated nuclear disarmament and continued friendship with America's wartime ally, the Soviet Union. This placed him on the wrong side of American Cold War policies. The Soviet Union extensively promoted the work of Kent, who was among hundreds of other prominent intellectuals and creative artists targeted by those in league with Joseph McCarthy, but he and William Gropper share the distinction of being the only graphic artists to be targeted.

Kent was not a Communist and considered his political views to be in the best traditions of American democracy. However, his participation in the Stockholm Appeal and the World Peace Council led to the suspension of his passport in 1950. After he filed suit to regain his foreign-travel rights, in June 1958, the U.S. Supreme Court in Kent v. Dulles affirmed his right to travel by declaring the ban a violation of his civil rights. Meanwhile, Kent also came under attack as an officer of the International Workers Order, a mutual benefit and cultural society supported by leftists and immigrants. In 1951, Kent defended his record in court proceedings and exposed the perjured testimony that claimed he was a Communist.

From 1957 to 1971, Kent was president of the National Council of American-Soviet Friendship. After a well-received exhibition of his work in five Soviet museums – Pushkin State Museum of Fine Arts, the State Hermitage Museum, Kiev Museum of Western and Eastern Art, Odessa Museum of Western and Eastern Art and State Museum of Fine Arts, Riga – in 1957–58, he donated several hundred of his paintings and drawings to the Soviet peoples in 1960 (as catalogued in "Rockwell Kent's Forgotten Landscapes": Scott R Ferris and Ellen Pearce. Down East Books. 1998). He subsequently became an honorary member of the Soviet Academy of Fine Arts and in 1967 the recipient of the International Lenin Peace Prize. Kent specified that his prize money be given to the women and children of Vietnam, both North and South. (The nature of Kent's gift is clarified by his third wife, Shirley "Sally" Kent, née Johnstone, in the 2005 documentary Rockwell Kent, produced and written by Fred Lewis.)

=== Meeting with Soviet Ukrainian artists ===
Rockwell Kent traveled to the Soviet Union and found like-minded people there. In the preface to the second Russian edition of his book "Salamina", Kent wrote: "Recently… I've met two talented young artists from Kyiv Ada Rybachuk and Volodymyr Melnychenko. They lived and worked in the Soviet Arctic, just like me, they love the North and its inhabitants… Shouldn't art reveal the essence of Humanity? .. We who strive to create a better world for people must know the clay from which we form man."

== Legacy ==
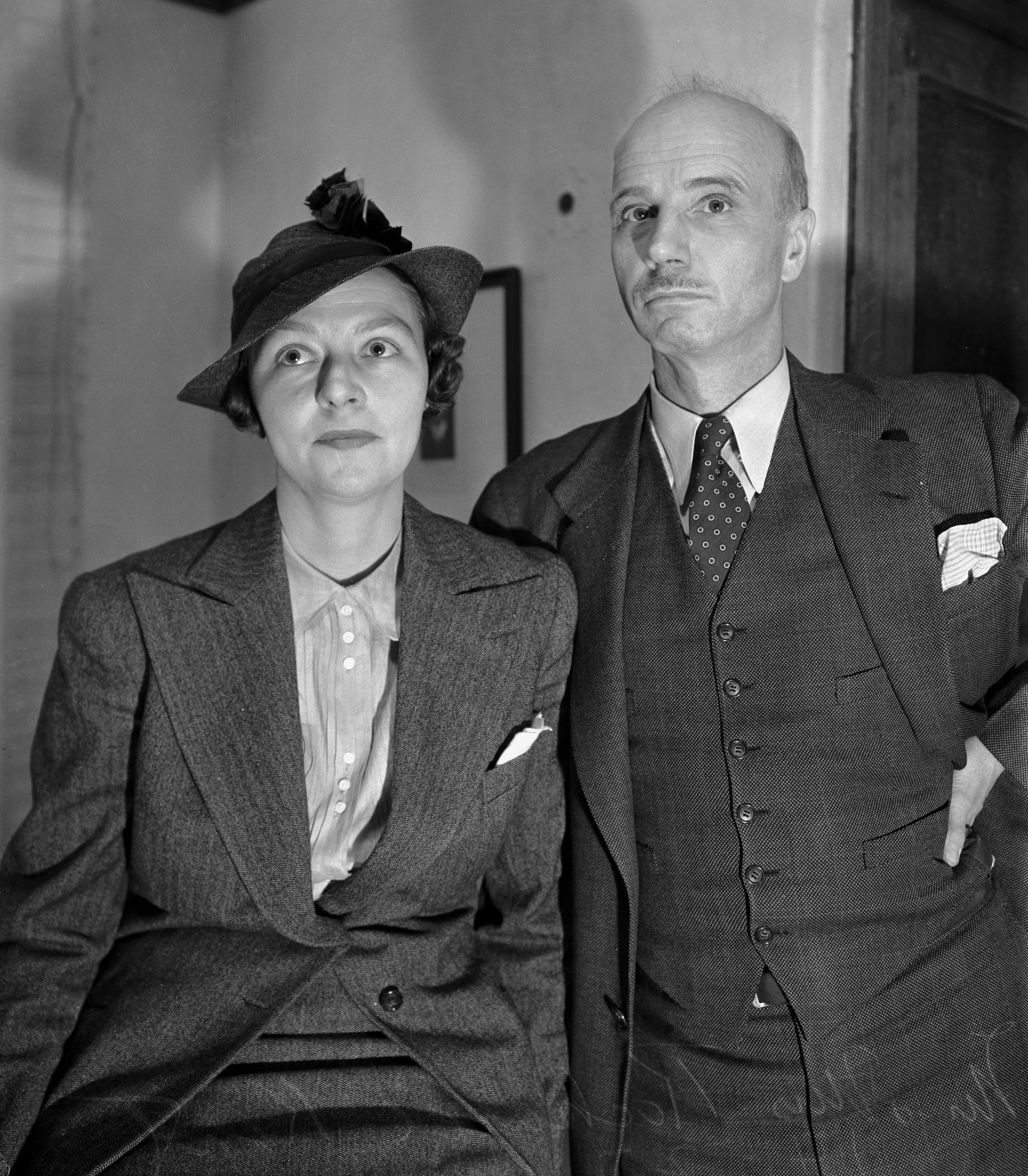
Kent with his second wife, Frances Lee Kent, née Higgins, 1937

When Kent died of a heart attack in 1971, the New York Times published an extensive front-page obituary that commenced: "At various (and frequently simultaneous) periods of his long life the protean Rockwell Kent was an architect, painter, illustrator, lithographer, xylographer, cartoonist, advertising artist, carpenter, dairy farmer, explorer, trade union leader and political controversialist. "He is so multiple a person as to be multifarious," Louis Untermeyer, the poet, once observed." When an anthology of Kent's work was published in 1982, a reviewer of the book for the New York Times further described Kent as "... a thoughtful, troublesome, profoundly independent, odd and kind man who made an imperishable contribution to the art of bookmaking in the United States." Retrospectives of the artist's paintings and drawings have been mounted, by the Art Gallery of Newfoundland and Labrador in St. John's, Newfoundland, where the exhibition Pointed North: Rockwell Kent in Newfoundland and Labrador was curated by Caroline Stone in the summer of 2014. Other exhibitions include an exhibition in 2013 in Winona, Minnesota marking the centennial of Kent's time there; the Richard F. Brush Art Gallery and Owen D. Young Library at St. Lawrence University (Canton, New York) in the autumn of 2012; the Farnsworth Art Museum (Rockland, Maine) during the spring through autumn of 2012; the Bennington Museum in Vermont during the summer of 2012; the Philadelphia Museum of Art in the spring through summer of 2012; and the Portland Museum of Art, Maine for the major summer show of 2005 commemorating the centenary of Kent's arrival on Monhegan Island.

2018 through 2020 marked the 100th anniversary of Kent's Alaskan painting expedition, his stay on Fox Island, and the publication of Wilderness: A Journal of Quiet Adventure in Alaska. The letters he wrote and received during that time reveal a less than quiet experience beneath his book's narrative. Personal correspondence with his first wife, Kathleen née Whiting, and with Hildegarde Hirsch, his inamorata of that time, provide a fascinating glimpse into the backstory of his life. A more detailed account can be found at the blog Rockwell Kent "Wilderness" Centennial Journal.

One of Kent's exemplary pen-and-ink drawings from Moby Dick appears on a U.S. postage stamp issued as part of the 2001 commemorative panel celebrating American Illustration, with other artistic examples by Maxfield Parrish, Frederic Remington, and Norman Rockwell. The year he spent in Newfoundland in 1914-1915 is fictionally recalled by Canadian writer Michael Winter in The Big Why, his 2004 Winterset Award-winning novel. Kent's work also figures in Steve Martin's 2010 novel An Object of Beauty and is the subject of a chapter in Douglas Brinkley's 2011 history The Quiet World: Saving Alaska's Wilderness Kingdom: 1879–1960.

Columbia University is the repository of Rockwell Kent's personal collection of 3,300 working drawings and sketches, most of which were unpublished. The gift was made in 1972 by Mr. and Mrs. Alfred C. Berol, Corliss Lamont, Mrs. Arthur Hayes Sulzberger, and Dan Burne Jones.

The Archives of American Art is the repository for Kent's voluminous correspondence.

== Works ==
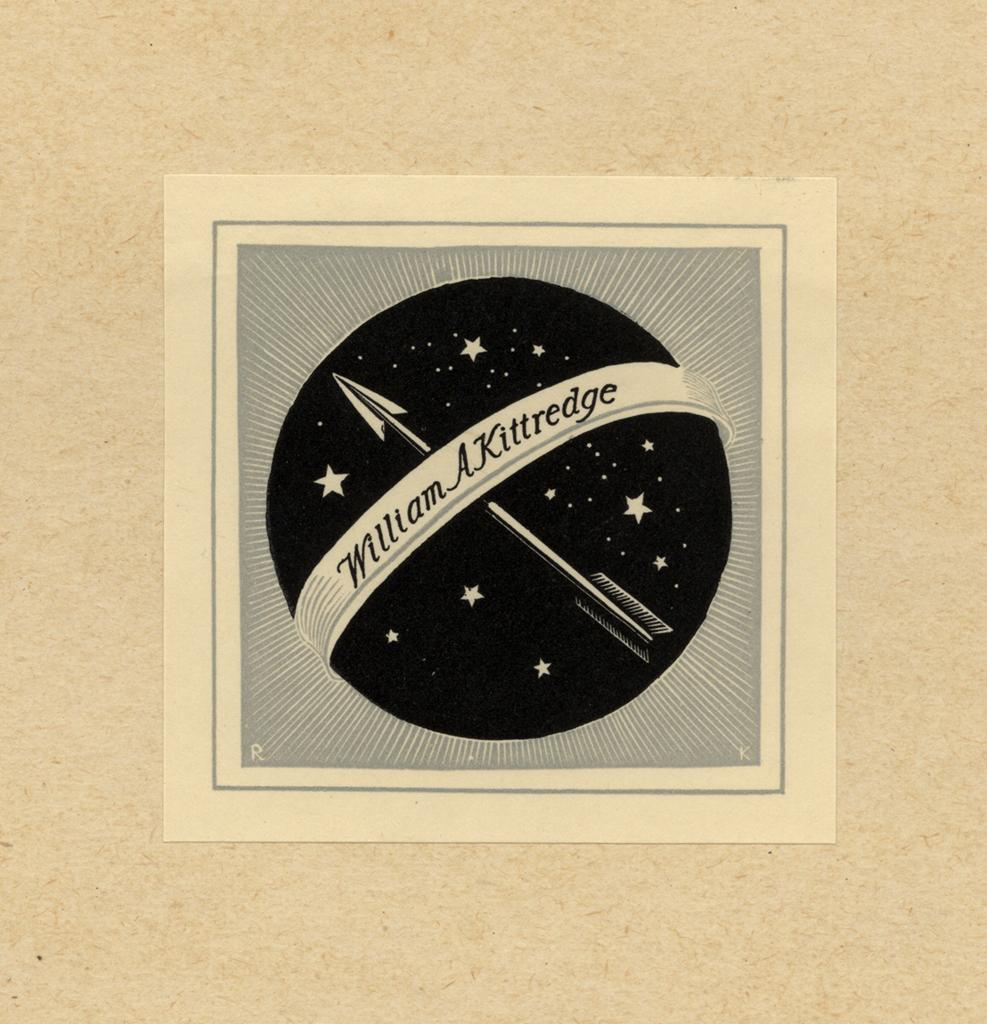
Bookplate designed by Rockwell Kent

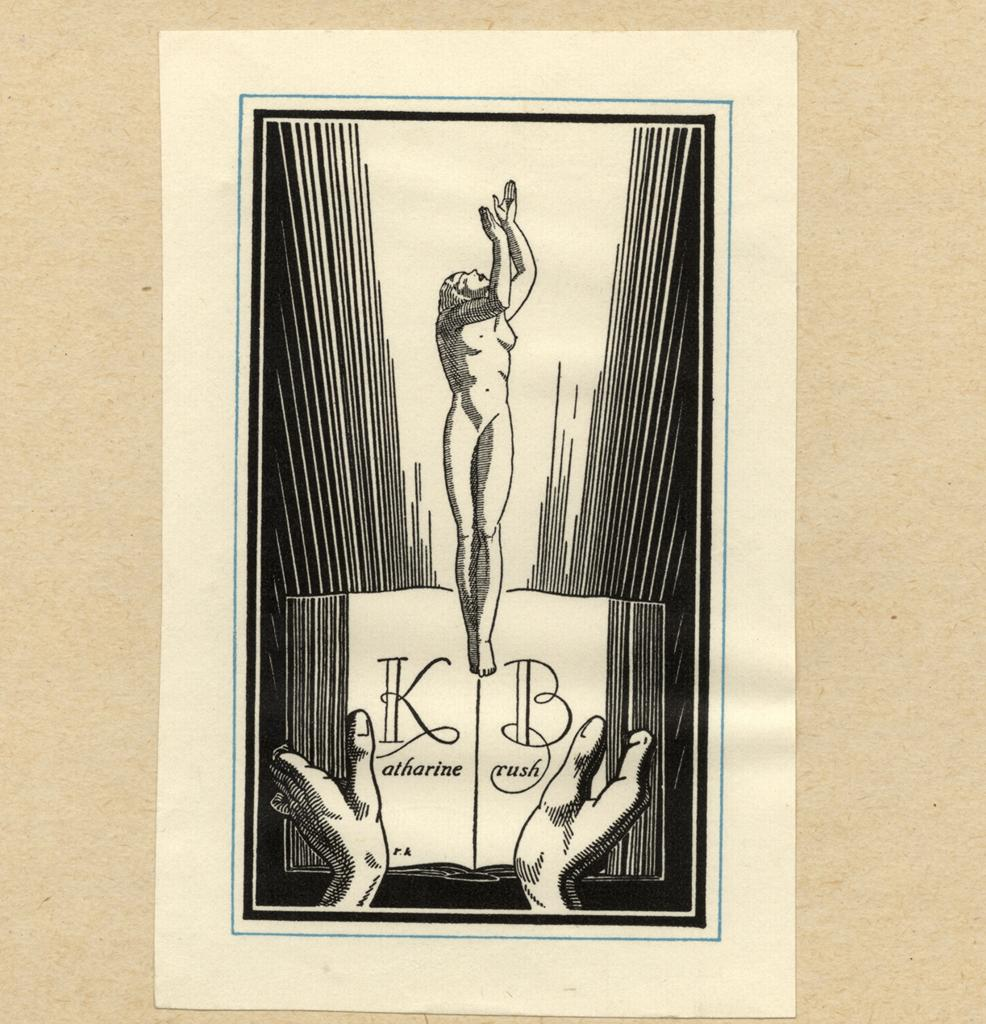
Bookplate illustration by Kent

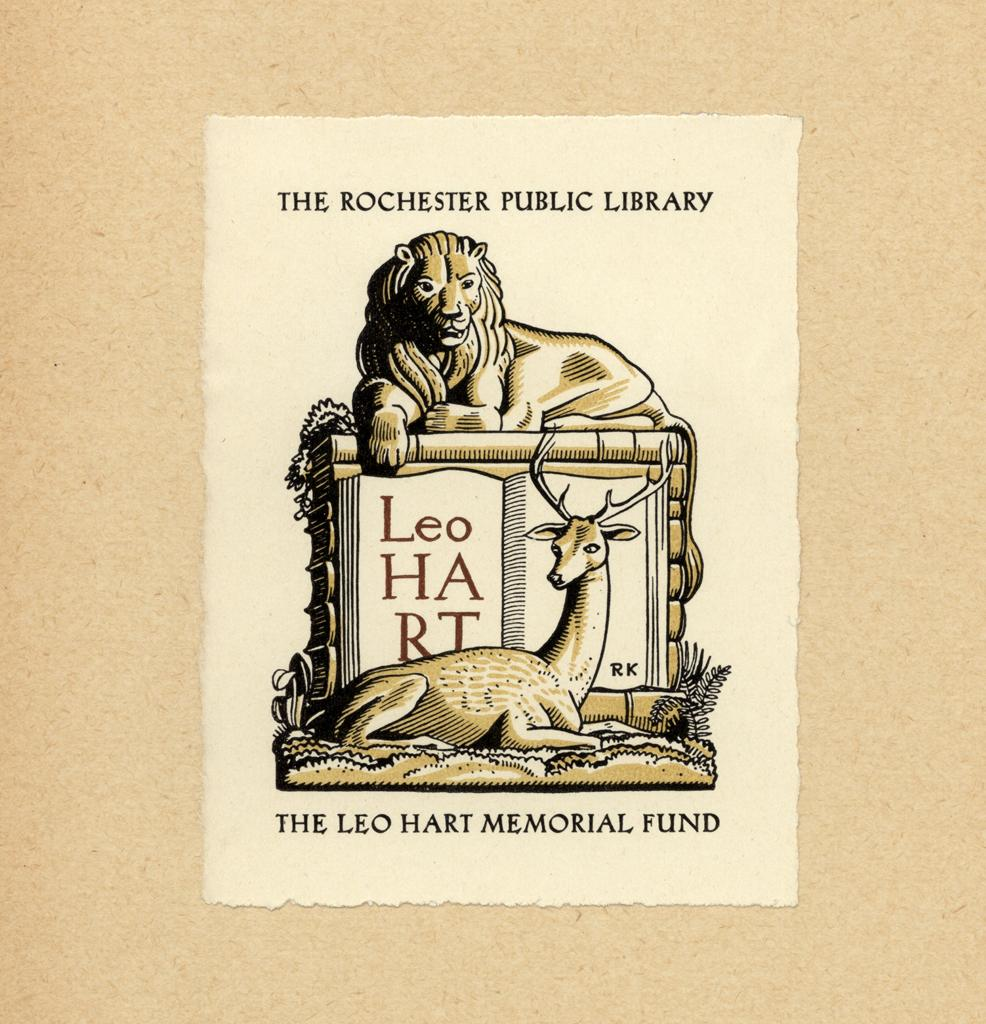
Bookplate by Kent for the Rochester Public Library (Rochester, NY)

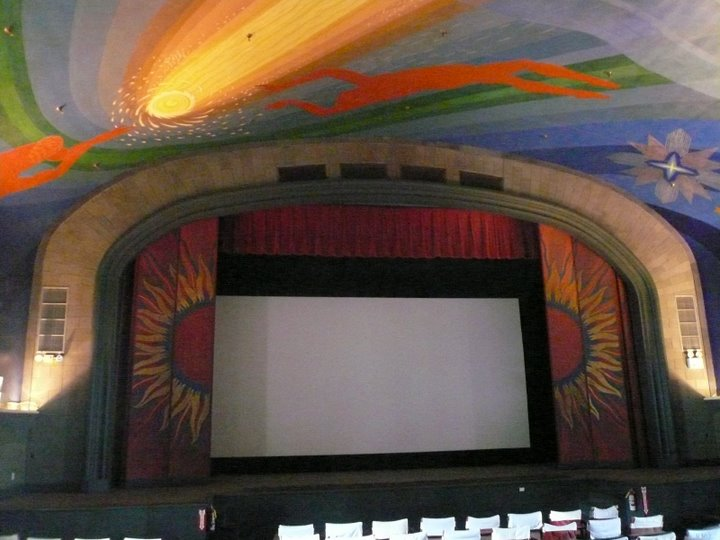
Cape Cinema Interior with murals by Rockwell Kent and Jo Mielziner, Dennis, Massachusetts.

=== Written and illustrated by Rockwell Kent ===
Kent was a prolific writer whose adventure memoirs and autobiographies include:

- Wilderness: A Journal of Quiet Adventure in Alaska — Memoir of the fall and winter of 1918/19 painting and exploring with his eldest son on Fox Island in Resurrection Bay, Alaska (New York and London: G.P. Putnam's Sons, 1920) [filled with the artist's pen/brush and ink drawings];
- Voyaging Southwards from the Strait of Magellan – Memoir of 1922–23 travels in and around Tierra del Fuego (New York and London: G.P. Putnam's Sons, 1924) [filled with the artist's pen/brush and ink drawings];
- N by E — Memoir of the summer 1929 voyage to (and shipwreck on the rocks of) Greenland (1930) [filled with the artist's pen/brush and ink drawings as well as several wood engravings];
- Rockwellkentiana – Few words and many pictures by Rockwell Kent and Carl Zigrosser, A bibliography and list of prints (New York: Harcourt, Brace & Co., 1933);
- Salamina – Memoir of his first Arctic winter (1931–32) painting and exploring while based in the tiny settlement of Illorsuit, Greenland (1935) [filled with the artist's pen/brush and ink drawings as well as several conte crayon portrait drawings];
- This is My Own – autobiography, focusing on the years 1928–1939 in Au Sable Forks, Adirondacks (1940) [filled with the artist's pen/brush and ink drawings];
- It's Me, O Lord – full-scale autobiography (1955);
- Of Men and Mountains Ausable Forks: Asgaard Press, 1959, printed by the press of A. Colish, Mount Vernon, NY;
- Greenland Journal – the author's original diaries from Igdlorssuit, Greenland, 1962, New York, Ivan Obolensky [filled with the artist's pen/brush and ink drawings];
- After Long Years Ausable Forks: Asgaard Press, 1968, printed by the press of A. Colish, Mount Vernon, edn. of 250 copies, signed by the author.

=== Illustrated by Rockwell Kent ===
- The Seven Ages of Man, portfolio of 4 linecut reproductions after pen/brush and ink drawings, each signed and mounted, contained in paper cartridge wrappers with an illustrated cover label dated 1918, limited to 100 numbered copies but many fewer actually printed;
- Rollo in Society, George S. Chappell (1922) Published by G. P. Putnam's Sons. Illustrated by Rockwell Kent with the pseudonym Hogarth Jr. 18 pen, brush, and ink drawings (photomechanically reproduced as linecuts or "cuts");
- "The Ballad of the Harp Weaver" -- "A Poem by Edna St. Vincent Millay--With a Decorative Drawing by Hogarth Jr." From Vanity Fair, June 1922
- The Memoirs of Jacques Casanova de Seingalt, 12 volumes, Translated into English by Arthur Machen, preface by Arthur Symons, Aventuros Society, Flying Stag Press, New York (1925) 12 Frontispieces are pen, brush, and ink drawings photomechanically reproduced as engravings;
- Candide – Voltaire (1928) pen and ink drawings reproduced by photomechanical engraving; some of the metal relief blocks are in the graphic arts collection of Princeton University Library;
- The Bookplates & Marks of Rockwell Kent (1929) Random House, edition of 1250 signed, numbered copies;
- Moby Dick or The Whale – Herman Melville (Chicago: Lakeside Press and New York: Random House, 1930), pen, brush, and ink drawings (often inaccurately described as woodcuts);
- The Memoirs of Jacques Casanova de Seingalt, two volume set in slipcase, Albert and Charles Boni, New York (1932) 8 pen, brush, and ink drawings photomechanically reproduced as engravings;
- Beowulf lithographs;
- Gabriel, A Poem in One Song by Alexander Pushkin, translated by Max Eastman, NY: Covici-Friede, 1929, edition of 750, numbered copies;
- City Child – poetry by Selma Robinson - 41 pen and ink drawings, with a lithograph "Farewell" as frontispiece (NY: The Colophon, 1931), edition of 300, one volume set in slipcase, each signed by Robinson and with Kent's heart-shaped mark. 8 of the original pen and ink drawings are in the collection of The Morgan Library;
- The Mountains Wait – dust jacket only;
- Seed – novel by Charles Norris – dust jacket, binding;
- Zest – novel by Charles Norris – dust jacket, binding;
- Candy – novel by Lillie McMakin Alexander (1934) pen, brush, and ink drawings;
- Leaves of Grass – poetry by Walt Whitman (1936) pen, brush, and ink drawings;
- Erewhon – novel by Samuel Butler;
- The Bridge of San Luis Rey – novel by Thornton Wilder;
- Faust – by Goethe pen, brush, and ink drawings;
- Paul Bunyan – novel by Esther Shephard (1941) pen, brush, and ink drawings;
- A Treasury of Sea Stories – anthology edited by Gordon C. Aymar pen, brush, and ink drawings;
- Gisli's Saga – Medieval Icelandic saga;
- Autumn Leaves – social commentary by P W Litchfield;
- To Thee! - a centennial history of Rahr Malting Company and a paean to American freedom and democracy (1946) - pen, brush, and ink drawings (almost all of which are in the collection of the Lucas Museum of Narrative Art);
- Canterbury Tales (1930) pen, brush, and ink drawings;
- The Decameron – novel by Giovanni Boccaccio translated by Richard Aldington, NY: Garden City Press (1949) pen, brush, and ink drawings;
- The Complete Works of Shakespeare.
- End papers for The Modern Library books under the editorship of Bennett Cerf.

=== Murals by or designed by Rockwell Kent ===
- The Cape Cinema Murals, Dennis, MA (1930), designed by Rockwell Kent, executed by Jo Mielziner (1901–1976) and a crew of stage set painters from New York City, finished by Kent;
- United States Post Office Department Headquarters, Washington DC (1938);
- 1939 World's Fair mural for the General Electric pavilion;
- America at Peace located in the House Committee on Natural Resources "Walter B. Jones" Hearing Room, 1334 Longworth House Office Building, US Capitol Complex, Washington D.C.

=== Other works designed by Rockwell Kent ===
- Snow Fields (Winter in the Berkshires) (1909, oil on canvas painting, located in Smithsonian American Art Museum)
- 1939 Christmas Seal; National Tuberculosis Association
- The original logo for Random House.

== See also ==
- Rockwell Kent Cottage and Studio, Monhegan Island, Maine
- Kent Cottage, Brigus, Newfoundland
