= North American Committee to Aid Spanish Democracy =

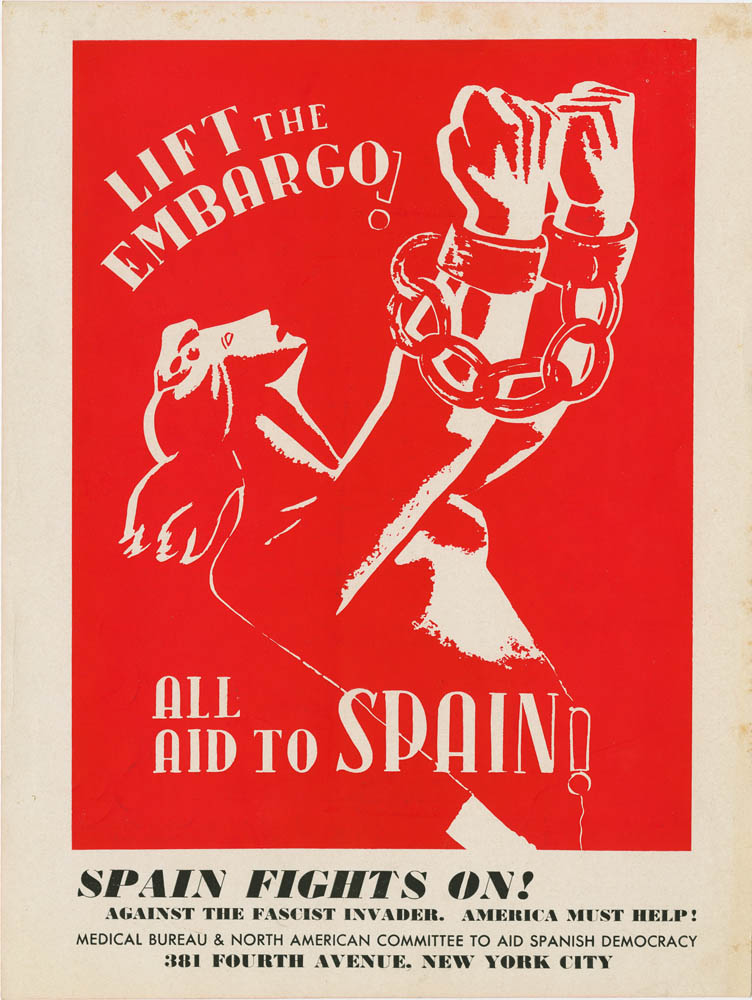
Advertisement protesting the embargo on Spain (March 1939)

The North American Committee to Aid Spanish Democracy was an American organization established in 1936. It was an umbrella organization for ethnic groups and trade unions that donated money, medical necessities, and food to Spain through it. These donations were sent to the Spanish Loyalists during the Spanish Civil War.

It was identified as a communist front organization linked to the Communist Party USA. The historian Peter N. Carroll describes the organization as a "Popular Front organization that attracted Communists and Christians alike."
