= USCGC White Sage =

White-class buoy tender of the United States Coast Guard

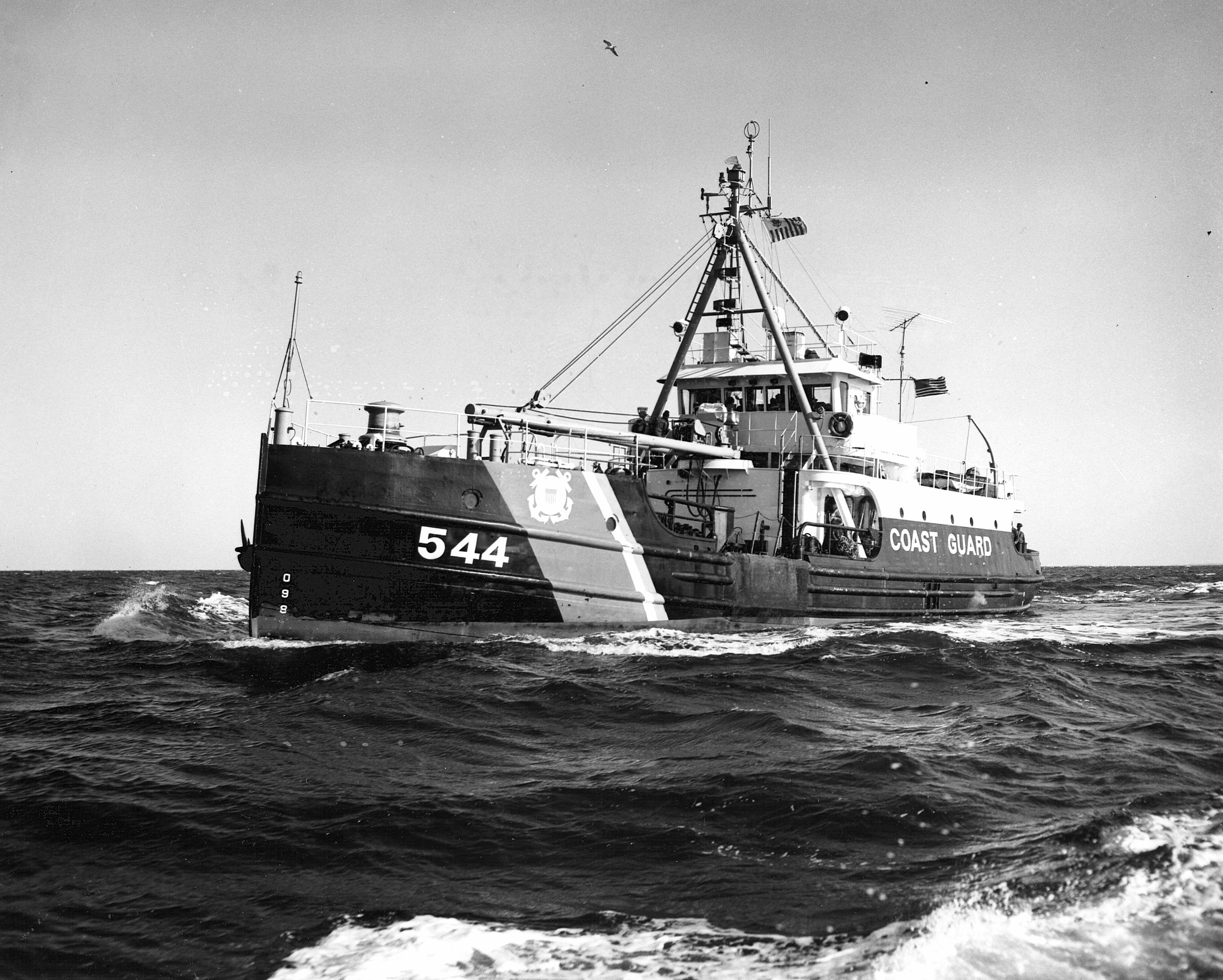
- USCGC White Sage

History

United States
- Name: YF-444
- Builder: Erie Concrete & Steel Supply Co.
- Laid down: 28 March 1943
- Launched: 19 June 1943
- Commissioned: 29 May 1944
- Decommissioned: 1946
- Honors and awards: See Awards
- Fate: Transferred to US Coast Guard, 1946

History

United States
- Name: White Sage
- Namesake: White Sage
- Acquired: 1946
- Commissioned: 9 August 1947
- Decommissioned: 28 June 1996
- Reclassified: WLM-544, 1960s
- Identification: Hull number: WAGL-544
- Fate: Donated to Canvasback Missions, Inc., 1999

General characteristics
- Class & type: YF-257-class lighter; White-class buoy tender
- Displacement: 600 t (591 long tons)
- Length: 132 ft 10 in (40.49 m)
- Beam: 30 ft 0 in (9.14 m)
- Draft: 8 ft 9 in (2.67 m)
- Installed power: 2 × shafts; 3 × rudders; 600 bhp (450 kW)
- Propulsion: As built: 2 × Union diesel engines; 1974: 2 × Caterpillar D-353-E diesel engines
- Speed: 10.5 kn (19.4 km/h; 12.1 mph)
- Range: 2,450 nmi (4,540 km; 2,820 mi) at 10.5 kn (19.4 km/h; 12.1 mph); 2,830 nmi (5,240 km; 3,260 mi) at 7.5 kn (13.9 km/h; 8.6 mph)
- Complement: 1 warrant, 20 crewmen (1947)

USS YF-444 was an American YF-257-class covered lighter built in 1944 for service in World War II. She was later acquired by the United States Coast Guard and renamed USCGC White Sage (WAGL-544).

== Construction and career ==
YF-444 was laid down by the Erie Concrete & Steel Supply Co., in Erie, Pennsylvania on 28 March 1943. She was launched on 19 June 1943. Her trials were held on Lake Erie on 17 April 1944, and she was commissioned on 20 May 1944. YF-444 and YF-446 departed Erie on 9 May 1994, with YF-640 and YF-641 in tow. Outfitted at the Brooklyn Navy Yard, New York, YF-444 was assigned to the Third Naval District to work in the Naval Ammunition Depot in Earle, New Jersey. After World War II, YF-444 was acquired by the USCG in 1946. The fifth vessel in her class, White Sage was commissioned into the Coast Guard as WAGL-544 on 9 August 1947.

According to her Ship's Characteristics Card, dated 21 November 1966, White Sage was 133'-6' in overall length, 32' in length between perpendiculars, 30'-9' in extreme beam, 12'-2 7/8' in depth of hold, 7–2 in draft forward fully loaded, and 5'-6' in draft forward with a light load. She is listed as having two masts, the forward mast being 57' tall and the aft 36'. The vessel displaced 476 tons and had a maximum speed of 10 knots fully loaded. Her hull, decks, bulkheads, and frames were constructed of steel, while her superstructure was steel and wood.

White Sage was originally homeported in Bristol, Rhode Island, where she primarily serviced aids to navigation in the First Coast Guard District. In 1950, her homeport was changed to Woods Hole, Massachusetts, also located within the First Coast Guard District.

In addition to her AtoN duties, White Sage performed many assists and rescues and sometimes acted as an icebreaker. Notable rescue missions included salvaging a capsized boat near Nantucket Island in 1952. On 29 January 1959, White Sage was requested to clear a passage through the ice to East Greenwich Cove, Rhode Island. Fishing boats were stuck, some damaged and sunk. She provided assistance following the collision between two motor vessels, Francisville and Luckenback, in July 1959. Sage assisted a disabled tug, M. Moran, two miles east of Cape Cod Canal on March 4, 1960.

Auxiliary boats in 1966 included a motor cargo boat, dinghy, and three seven-man rubber lifeboats. In 1966, she had her original diesel engines, which were opposed piston Fairbanks-Morse Diesels built by Union Diesel Engine Company, in Oakland, California. The engines had two propellers, 300 horsepower each, and two auxiliary diesel generators. In 1971, White Sage underwent a major renovation at the U.S. Coast Guard Yard in Curtis Bay, Maryland. Air conditioning for the crew's berthing area was requested by the commander of the First District in a 1971 memo, was later approved in 1976. Her machinery was modernized in 1975. These modifications brought about many changes, including updated equipment to improve her AtoN capabilities.

The controls for the boom were located forward of the pilothouse, immediately behind the mainmast and boom. The winches for operation of the cargo boom were located in the forward section of the house. The crew's mess of White Sage was remodeled in the 1980s entirely in stainless steel. Her galley was athwartships aft of the crew's mess. The tables and chairs were replaced by booths. All of the class had new bridges and bridge controls installed, reportedly each unique. Some remnants of original technology remained, however, such as the telephone communication system. White Sage had upside-down J-shaped davits to starboard, which were hand-operated. A single angle-iron davit was mounted forward of the funnel to port. The hull was longitudinally framed with deep web frames at about 5-ft. intervals.

In 1988, her homeport was changed back to Bristol.

White Sage routinely cleared channels after severe storms or northeasters, including Hurricane Bob in 1991, when the eye of the storm passed directly over Woods Hole and disrupted the entire aids-to- navigation system. White Sage was crucial in keeping open shipping lanes on Narragansett Bay during severe ice conditions during the winter of 1993–1994, ensuring delivery of heating oil to homes in the affected area.

White Sage participated as a Command and Control platform in many marine events including the America's Cup regattas. In addition to serving as a platform to provide support for the small patrol craft, she maintained the security zone for the race course. Before retirement, White Sage served as the Command and Control platform for the Patrol Commander for the Quonset, Rhode Island, airshow in 1995.

White Sage was decommissioned on 7 June 1996. White Sage played an important role in pollution response, assisting in the 1996 North Cape oil spill cleanup off Point Judith.

Before decommissioning in 1999, White Sage's length, beam, and draft remained the same. The engines in 1999 were Caterpillar D353 Diesel reduction (4 to 1), for each screw. The screws were constant pitch propellers. White Sage and other ships built and later modified at Erie (including White Sumac, White Heath, and White Lupine) had a quiet room for the engine room controls.

White Sage had an oily water separator unique among the ships of the class. In 1999, she still had the original electric engine-augmented shaft-and-cable steering system. She had a chill water air conditioning system (essentially radiators in boxes), which could also use hot water from the hot water boiler in the engine room.

White Sage had a heavy-duty A-frame boom, which replaced the original single mast, used to handle buoys and anchors. There was a weather deck broken by a topgallant forecastle raised about 4-ft. above the main deck. The open foredeck was surrounded by a partial bulwark and pipe rails. The main deck continued at the same level aft through the superstructure onto the small fantail area, aft of the superstructure.

The superstructure consisted of a single-deck-height house surmounted by a raised pilothouse, and commander's stateroom forward. The engine room casing extended up through the top of the house, topped by skylights, with the funnel amidships forward. Hoses for dewatering pumps were contained in plastic tubing mounted on the centerline above the engine room skylights.

White Sage was responsible for 275 AtoN from Chatham to Block Island, which included the waters of Nantucket Sound, Buzzards Bay, and Narragansett Bay. She extended her service area out to New Haven, Connecticut, when she took over an additional 160 buoys when the USCGC Red Wood was placed out of service. White Sage transported freight and vehicles to Coast Guard units in the islands of Nantucket and Cuttyhunk, as well as serviced the lights in Buzzards Bay.

She was replaced by the first Keeper-class 175-foot tender, Ida Lewis. In 1999, White Sage was transferred, along with the White Holly, to the Canvasback Missions, Inc.
