= USCGC White Sumac =

White-class buoy tender of the United States Coast Guard

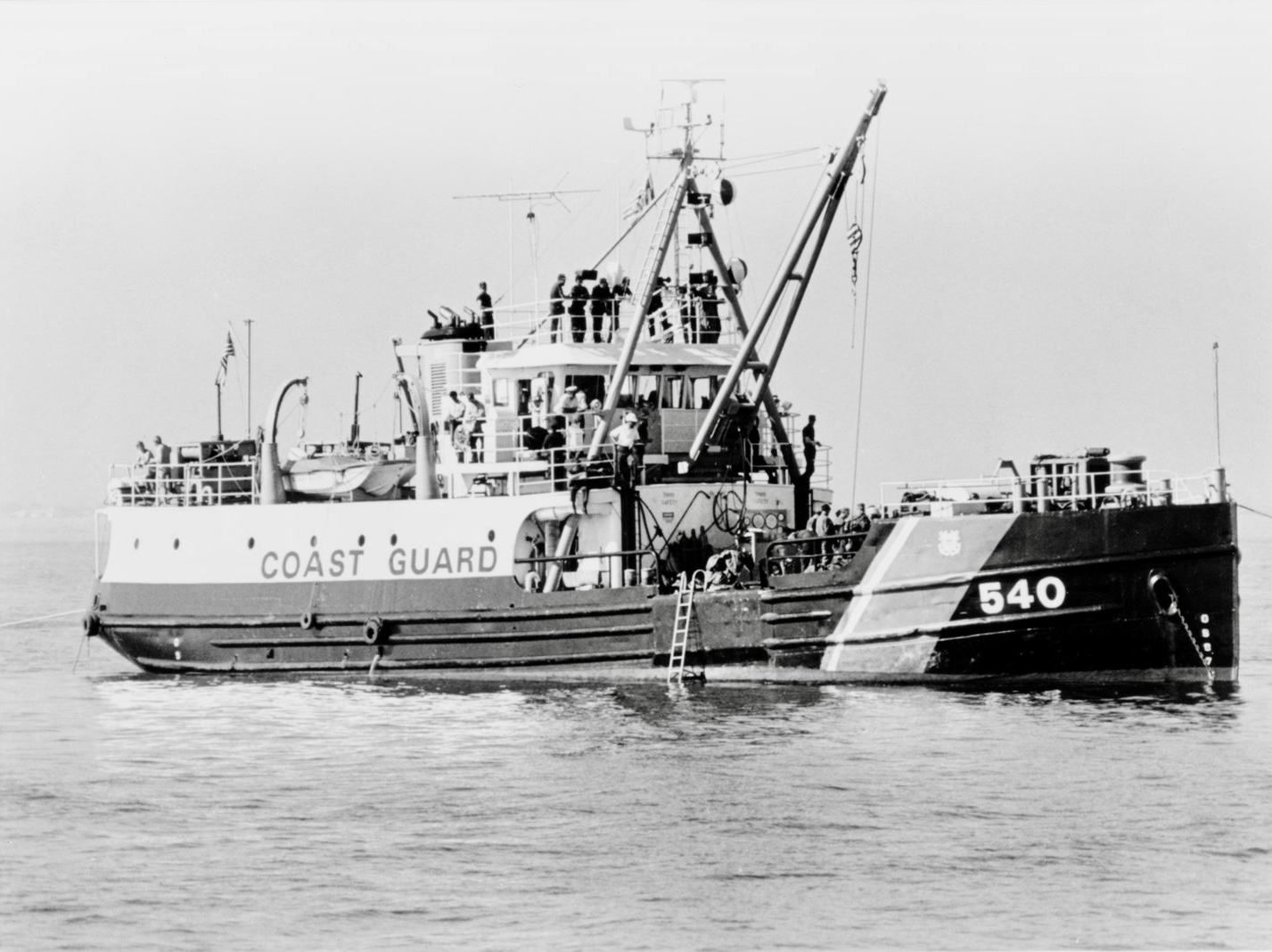
- USCGC White Sumac

History

United States
- Name: YF-416
- Builder: Niagara Shipbuilding Co.
- Laid down: 1942
- Launched: 1943
- Commissioned: 6 November 1943
- Decommissioned: 1946
- Stricken: 17 July 1947
- Honors and awards: See Awards
- Fate: Transferred to US Coast Guard, 1946

History

United States
- Name: White Sumac
- Namesake: White Sumac
- Acquired: 1946
- Commissioned: 19 September 1947
- Decommissioned: 1 August 2002
- Reclassified: WLM-540, 1968
- Identification: Hull number: WAGL-540
- Fate: Sold to Dominican Republic, 2002

History

Dominican Republic
- Name: Capotillo
- Namesake: Capotillo
- Acquired: 2002
- Reclassified: PM-204
- Home port: Santo Domingo
- Identification: Pennant number: BA-2
- Status: Active

General characteristics
- Class & type: YF-257-class lighter; White-class buoy tender
- Displacement: 600 t (591 long tons)
- Length: 132 ft 10 in (40.49 m)
- Beam: 30 ft 0 in (9.14 m)
- Draft: 8 ft 9 in (2.67 m)
- Installed power: 2 × shafts; 3 × rudders; 600 bhp (450 kW)
- Propulsion: As built: 2 × Union diesel engines; 1974: 2 × Caterpillar D-353-E diesel engines
- Speed: 10.5 kn (19.4 km/h; 12.1 mph)
- Range: 2,450 nmi (4,540 km; 2,820 mi) at 10.5 kn (19.4 km/h; 12.1 mph); 2,830 nmi (5,240 km; 3,260 mi) at 7.5 kn (13.9 km/h; 8.6 mph)
- Complement: 1 warrant, 20 crewmen (1947)

USS YF-416 was an American YF-257-class covered lighter built in 1943 for service in World War II. She was later acquired by the United States Coast Guard and renamed USCGC White Sumac (WAGL-540).

== Construction and career ==
YF-416 was laid down by the Niagara Shipbuilding Co., in Buffalo, New York in 1942. She was launched in 1943. Her trials were held on Lake Erie on 17 April 1944, and she was commissioned on 6 November 1943 and assigned to the 3rd Naval District. She served the Navy for four years before being taken out of service.

In 1947 she was transferred to the Coast Guard, who converted her for use as a tender. She was commissioned White Sumac (WAGL-540) on 19 September 1947 at Charleston, South Carolina, and was assigned to the 7th Coast Guard District. She was based out of Key West, Florida. Her assignment included tending aids to navigation, law enforcement and search and rescue.

On 2 February 1954, she assisted the F/V Elliot near Key West. On 4 March 1954, she towed the disabled F/V Vkelpie to Key West. In the mid-1960s her designation was changed to WLM-540.

On 10 July 1968, she rescued 47 Haitian migrants from a distressed sloop 40 miles east of Andros Island. She transferred to St. Petersburg, Florida in 1969. Here she was responsible for providing logistics support to Egmont Key State Park, Dry Tortugas Light Station and Fort Jefferson National Park as well as servicing 240 floating aids and light structures encompassing 650 miles of the entire west coast of Florida, from Appalachia Bay south to the Florida Keys, along the Keys from Dry Tortugas and Key West to Miami and Ft. Pierce Inlet on Florida's east coast.

She underwent a major renovation at the Coast Yard in Baltimore, Maryland in 1972. In 1976, White Sumac and White Sage were given new air conditioning and AC electrical systems. On 5 June 1978, while under the command of CWO Fred Hemmingway, she came upon the P/C Joy Toy which was underway without lights. After identifying itself as a cutter the cutter's crew witnessed the three persons on board the vessel jump overboard and the vessel catch fire. White Sumac's crew then rescued three crewmen from the water and extinguished the fire. While extinguishing the fire one of the boarding party discovered marijuana on board and a thorough search of the Joy Toy uncovered 102 bales. Station Fort Lauderdale sent an MLB out to tow Joy Toy back to port along with the three prisoners.

She had the unhappy duty of acting as a working platform for divers during the salvage of the USCGC Blackthorn, which had collided with a tanker in Tampa Bay in January 1980. In May of that same year she responded after the M/V Summit Venture rammed into the Sunshine Skyway Bridge, which caused 1,200 feet of the bridge to collapse into the water. For three weeks White Sumac assisted with rescue efforts. Later that same year she returned a whale, named Byrdie, to the sea after the whale had beached itself earlier and was rescued and rehabilitated by Sea World. In November, 1980, she undertook a 10-day operation to recover a Coast Guard helicopter that had crashed and sunk 130 miles southwest of St. Petersburg. The operation was ultimately unsuccessful due to a hurricane that swept the area.

She was awarded a Coast Guard Meritorious Unit Commendation for her preparation for and execution of Operation Realignment, an aids to navigation project in the Gulfport Ship Channel from October to December, 1993. From 18 to 30 July 1997 she assisted after Hurricane Danny hit Florida for which she was awarded the Coast Guard Meritorious Unit Commendation. On 23 July 1998 she was awarded a Coast Guard Meritorious Unit Commendation for demonstrated exceptional multi-mission capabilities while providing outstanding aids to navigation support to Florida's West and Southeast Coasts. White Sumac expertly serviced over 600 aids to navigation along 770 nautical miles of Florida's Coast. Coordinating with the Army Corps of Engineers and Pilots’ Associations, White Sumac safely realigned six waterways during dredging Operations.

In 1998, she left Florida and sailed to her final homeport in New Orleans, Louisiana, to relieve the decommissioning White Holly. Here she maintained 176 buoys from Freshwater Bayou, Louisiana to Gulfport, Mississippi, including the Mississippi River from the Gulf of Mexico to Baton Rouge, Louisiana.

She was decommissioned on 1 August 2002 and was transferred to navy of the Dominican Republic, which commissioned her as BA-2 Capotillo. She was equipped with two 0.50 cal machine guns for self-defense.

On 29 November 2010, she conducted a training exercise together with USCGC Kodiak Island, Almirante Didiez Burgos and Orión off the coast of Catuano, Dominican Republic.

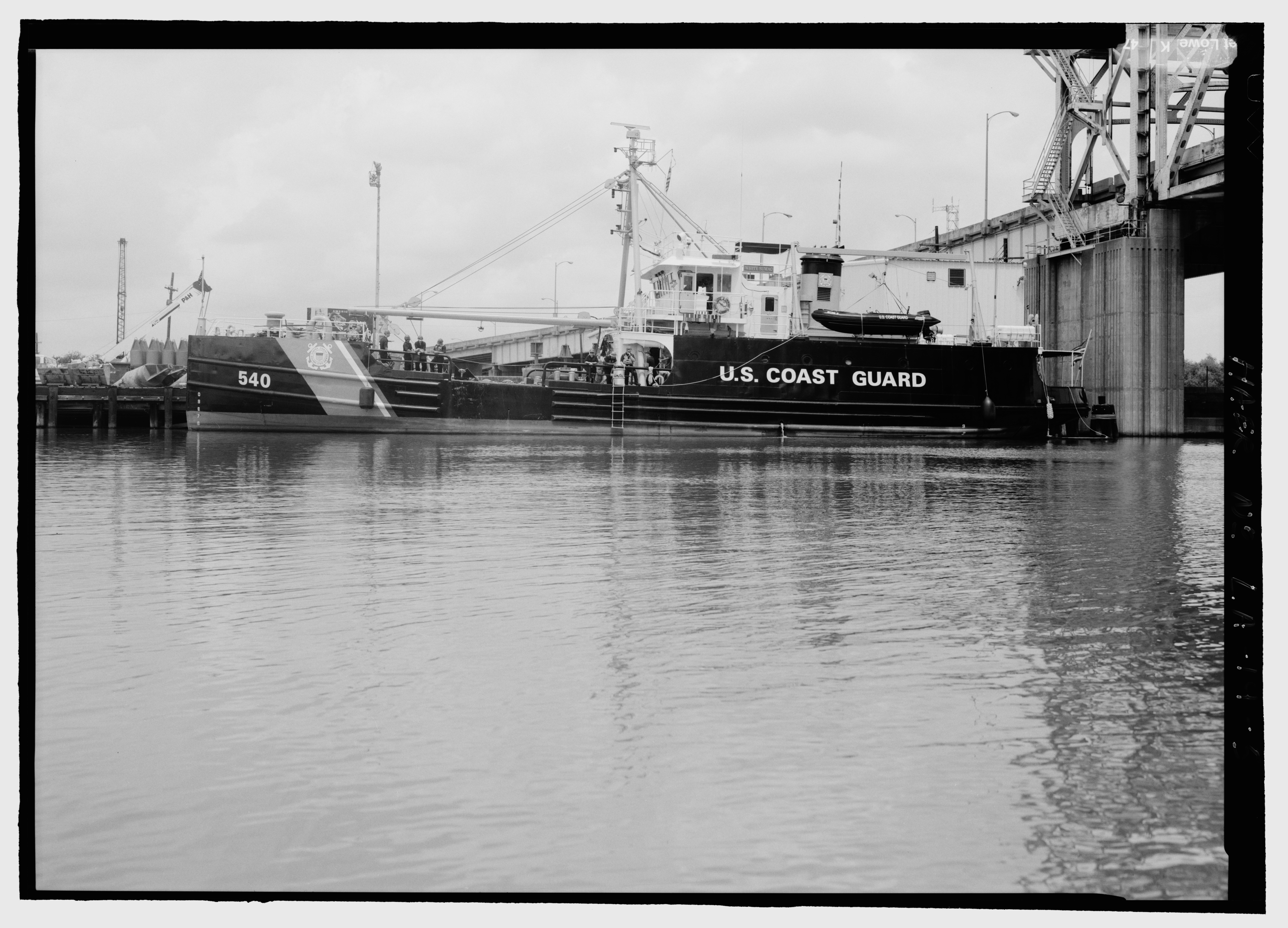
Portside view of White Sumac

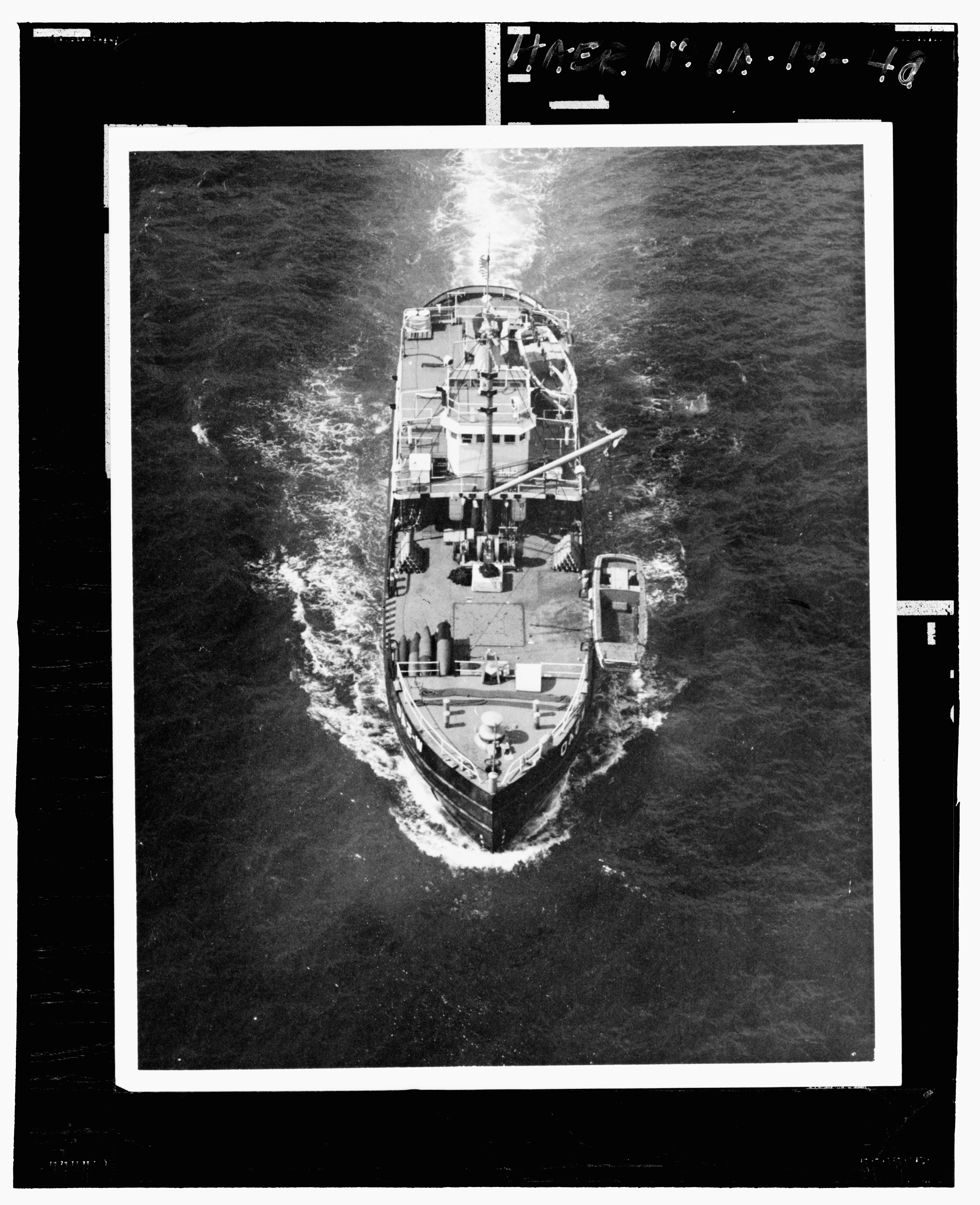
Aerial bow view of White Sumac

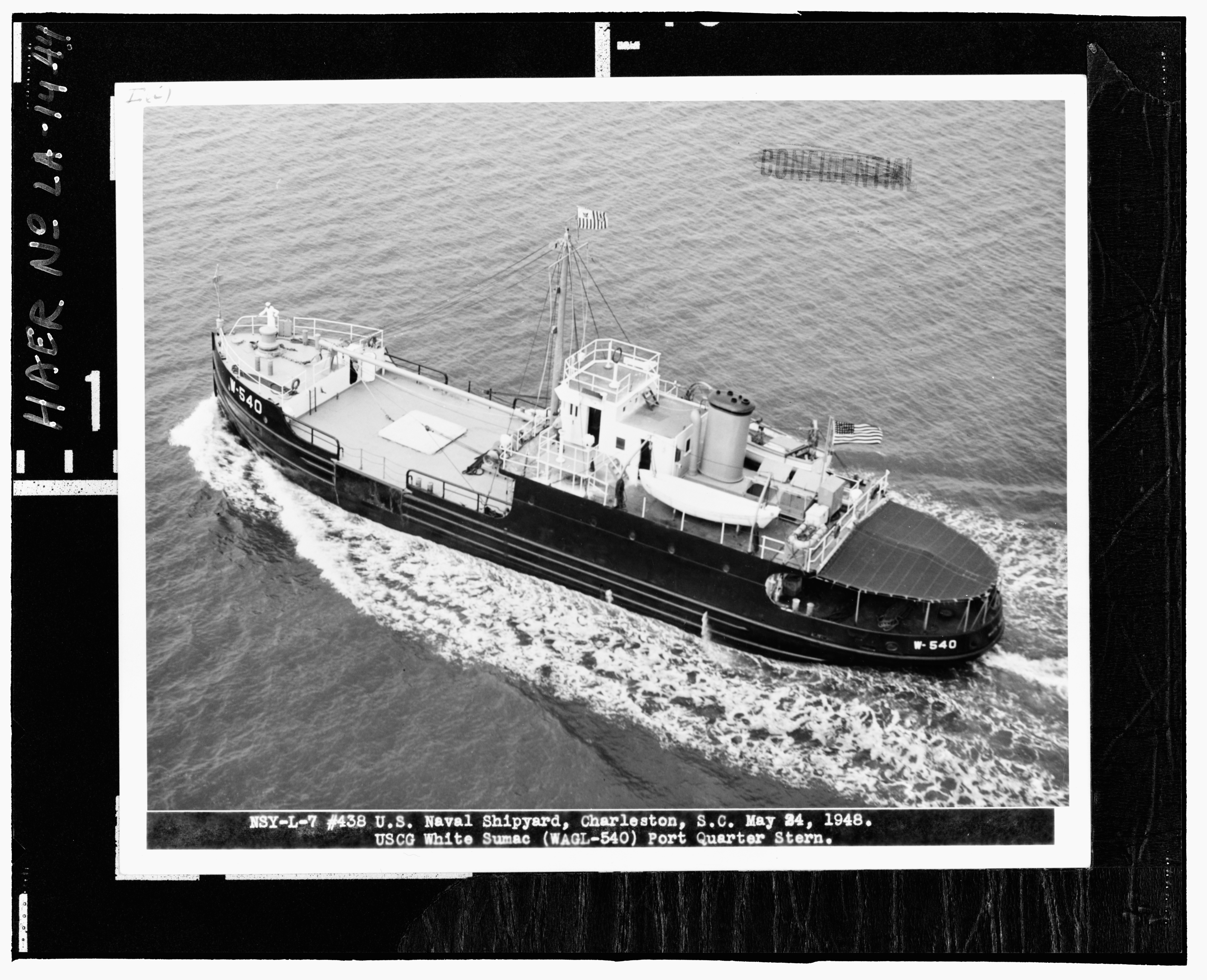
Stern view of White Sumac

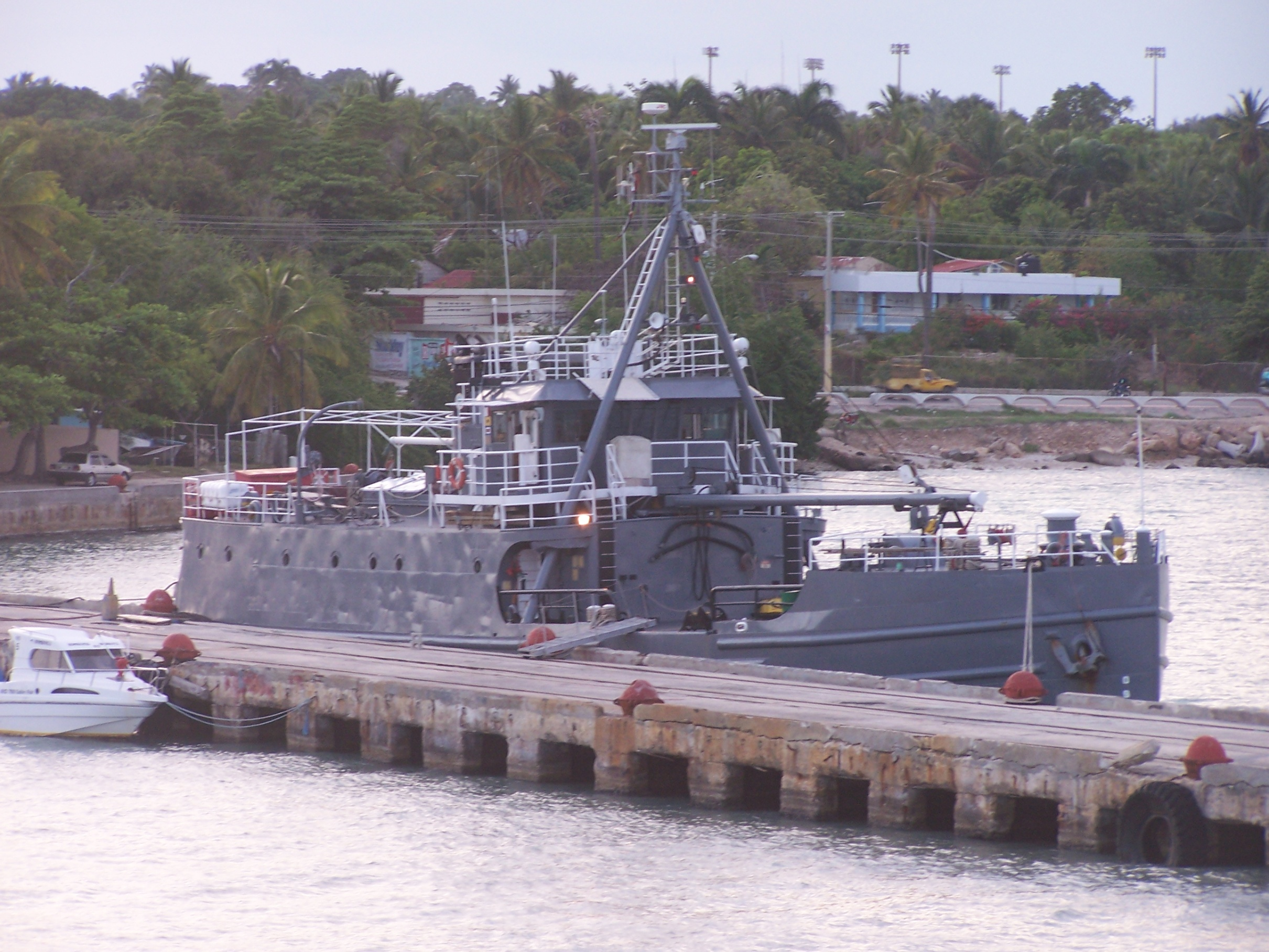
Capotillo (PM-204) in 2005

== Awards ==
- American Campaign Medal
- World War II Victory Medal
- Coast Guard Meritorious Unit Commendation (3 awards)
