= USCGC White Pine =

White-class buoy tender of the United States Coast Guard

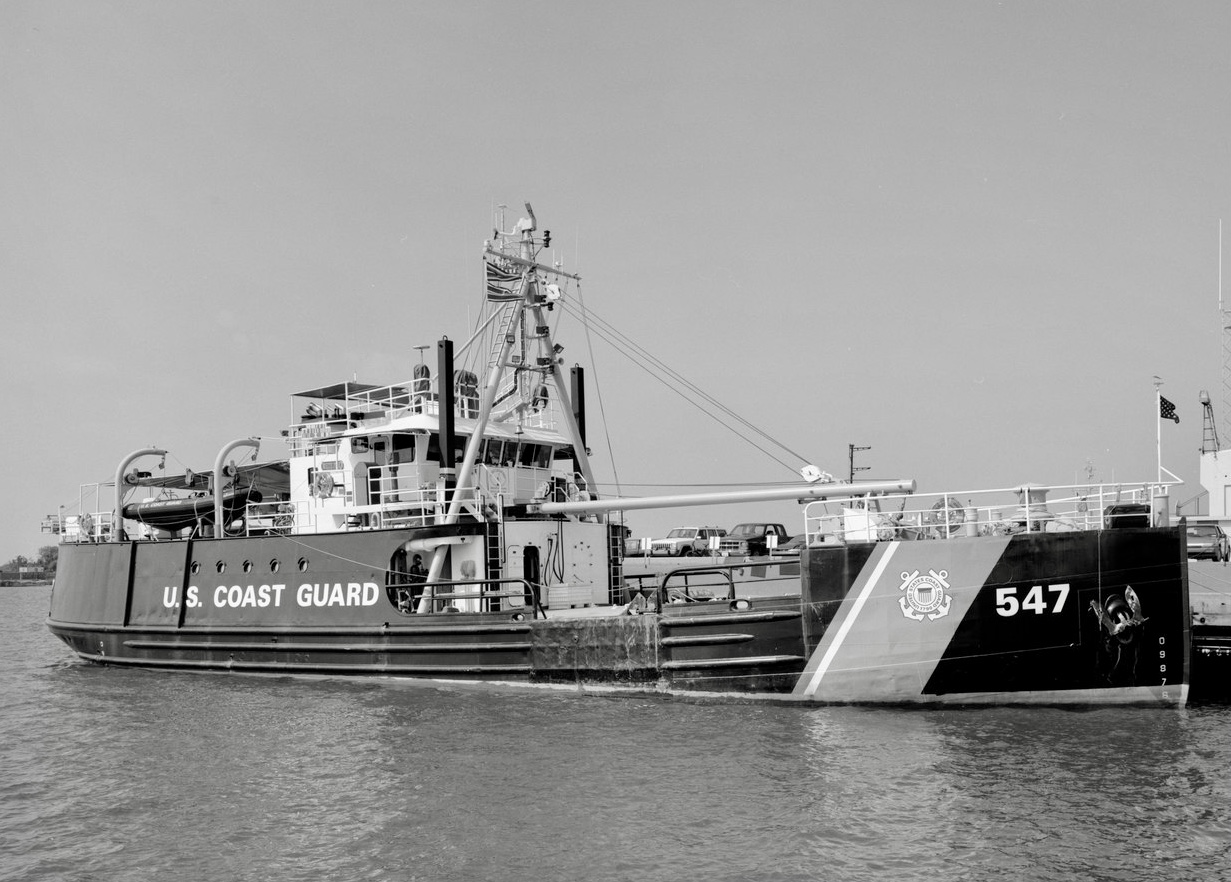
- USCGC White Pine

History

United States
- Name: YF-448
- Builder: Erie Concrete & Steel Supply Co.
- Laid down: 12 June 1943
- Launched: 28 August 1943
- Commissioned: 11 July 1944
- Decommissioned: 1946
- Identification: Callsign: NODE
- Honors and awards: See Awards
- Fate: Transferred to US Coast Guard, 5 December 1947

History

United States
- Name: White Pine
- Namesake: White Pine
- Acquired: 5 December 1947
- Commissioned: 3 August 1948
- Decommissioned: 29 June 1999
- Reclassified: WLM-547, 1960s
- Identification: Hull number: WAGL-547
- Fate: Sold to Dominican Republic, 1999

History

Dominican Republic
- Name: Tortuguero
- Namesake: Tortuguero
- Acquired: 1999
- Reclassified: PM-203
- Home port: Santo Domingo
- Identification: Pennant number: BA-1
- Status: Active

General characteristics
- Class & type: YF-257-class lighter; White-class buoy tender
- Displacement: 600 t (591 long tons)
- Length: 132 ft 10 in (40.49 m)
- Beam: 30 ft 0 in (9.14 m)
- Draft: 8 ft 9 in (2.67 m)
- Installed power: 2 × shafts; 3 × rudders; 600 bhp (450 kW)
- Propulsion: As built: 2 × Union diesel engines; 1974: 2 × Caterpillar D-353-E diesel engines
- Speed: 10.5 kn (19.4 km/h; 12.1 mph)
- Range: 2,450 nmi (4,540 km; 2,820 mi) at 10.5 kn (19.4 km/h; 12.1 mph); 2,830 nmi (5,240 km; 3,260 mi) at 7.5 kn (13.9 km/h; 8.6 mph)
- Complement: 1 warrant, 20 crewmen (1947)

USS YF-448 was an American YF-257-class covered lighter built in 1943 for service in World War II. She was later acquired by the United States Coast Guard and renamed USCGC White Pine (WAGL-547).

== Design ==
According to her "Ship's Characteristics Card" dated August 30, 1965, the White Pine was 132 feet 10 inches (40.49 m) in overall length; 132 feet (40 m) in length between perpendiculars; 30 feet 9.75 inches (9.3917 m) in extreme beam; 15 feet 8 inches (4.78 m) in depth of hold; 6 feet 2 inches (1.88 m) in draft forward fully loaded; and 5 feet (1.5 m) in draft forward with a light load. Her one mast was 48 feet (15 m) tall. The vessel displaced 600 tons and had a maximum speed of 9.2 knots fully loaded. Her hull, superstructure, decks, bulkheads, and frames were constructed of steel. Auxiliary boats in 1965 included a fiberglass outboard and three seven-man inflatable lifeboats. In 1965, she had her original diesel engine built by Union Diesel Engine Company, Oakland, California, with two propellers, 300 horsepower each, and two auxiliary diesel generators.

White Pine underwent a major renovation at Curtis Bay in Baltimore, Maryland. These modifications included updated equipment to improve her AtoN capabilities. Before decommissioning, White Pine's length was 133 feet (41 m); beam, 31 feet (9.4 m); and draft, 8 feet (2.4 m). Her displacement tonnage was listed at 606 gross tons and her mast height as 37 feet (11 m). She had a lifting capacity of 20,000 pounds, using two hydraulic pumps. She had twin Caterpillar diesel engines, 375 horsepower each, twin propellers, and Detroit Diesel auxiliary generators. Cruising capacity was 10 knots. Her maximum time out to sea was twenty days at 8 knots. Her complement of officers and crew was 26.

White Pine was unique in her class for having "spuds", that enabled her to service navigational aids in areas other tenders would find difficult or hazardous. Spuds are retractable vertical poles along the ship's side that are dropped down through vertical sleeves to penetrate the mud bottom to hold the vessel stationary in waters with strong current or where anchors cannot take hold. The spuds are retracted when the work is complete.

== Construction and career ==
YF-448 was laid down by the Erie Concrete & Steel Supply Co., in Erie, Pennsylvania on 12 June 1943. She was launched on 28 August 1943. Her trials were held on Lake Erie on 26 April 1944, and she was placed in service on 20 May 1944. YF-448 was delivered to the supply officer at the Brooklyn Navy Yard, New York, on 20 June 1944, and commissioned on 11 July 1944, with a single mast and boom hoist. Assigned to the Fifth Naval District, YF-448 served in the Maintenance Division.

After World War II, the U.S. Coast Guard acquired YF-448 in 1946 and was commissioned into the Coast Guard as White Pine (WAGL-547) on 3 August 1948. She was the last in her class to receive a commission. Before commissioning, White Pine was outfitted with a barge pusher on the bow to adapt her for working aids to navigation on the western rivers.

White Pine began her Coast Guard career in Memphis, Tennessee, where she replaced the Coast Guard cutter Wakerobin. In addition to servicing aids to navigation, she patrolled the Mississippi River for the Marathon Race in 1960. In 1961, she assisted with flood relief at Olive Branch, Tennessee. In late 1961, she was transferred to Curtis Bay, Baltimore, Maryland, where her barge structure was removed to accommodate servicing aids in the Chesapeake Bay. Her hoist was also replaced with an A-frame arrangement and hydraulic power. In 1965, White Pine assisted with firefighting on the Columbian M/V Ciudad de Nieva near Baltimore, Maryland.

In 1975, White Pine and White Holly were authorized to be quipped with air conditioning and AC electrical systems. 1976, White Pine was sent to Mobile, Alabama, to replace the Coast Guard cutter Blackthorn, which was being transferred to Galveston, Texas. After first inspection on 23 August 1976, the Chief of Staff noted, "Welcome to the 8th CG District. The maintenance of the ship and the appearance of the crew is such that the C.O. and the crew can be proud. Your arrival here has set the standard for other ships to strive for. I wish the White Pine much success in the A/N efforts in which she will be engaged."

White Pine's area of operation was primarily the Gulf Coast between Gulfport, Mississippi, and St. Marks, Florida, where she serviced 200 lighted and unlighted buoys. She also participated in search and rescue, salvage work, survey work, and marine law enforcement. In December 1984, White Pine rescued four persons from a sunken private craft in the Gulf of Mexico.

White Pine was decommissioned on 29 June 1999, and sold to the Dominican Republic, which commissioned her as BA-1 Tortuguero. She was equipped with two 0.50 cal machine guns for self-defense.

On 15 June 2013, Tortuguero, Orión and Almirante Didiez Burgos departed Santo Domingo for a training exercise.

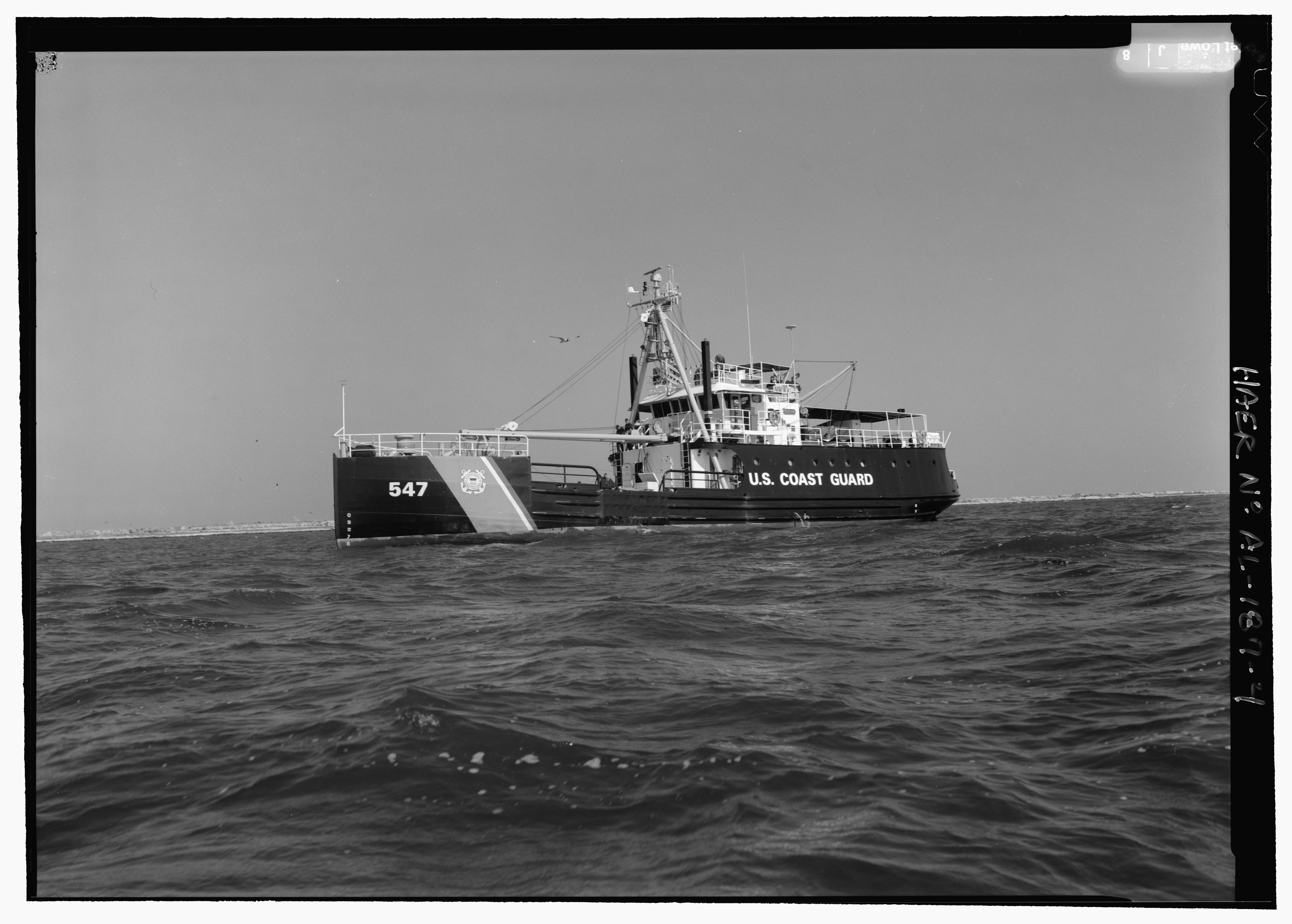
Portside view of White Pine

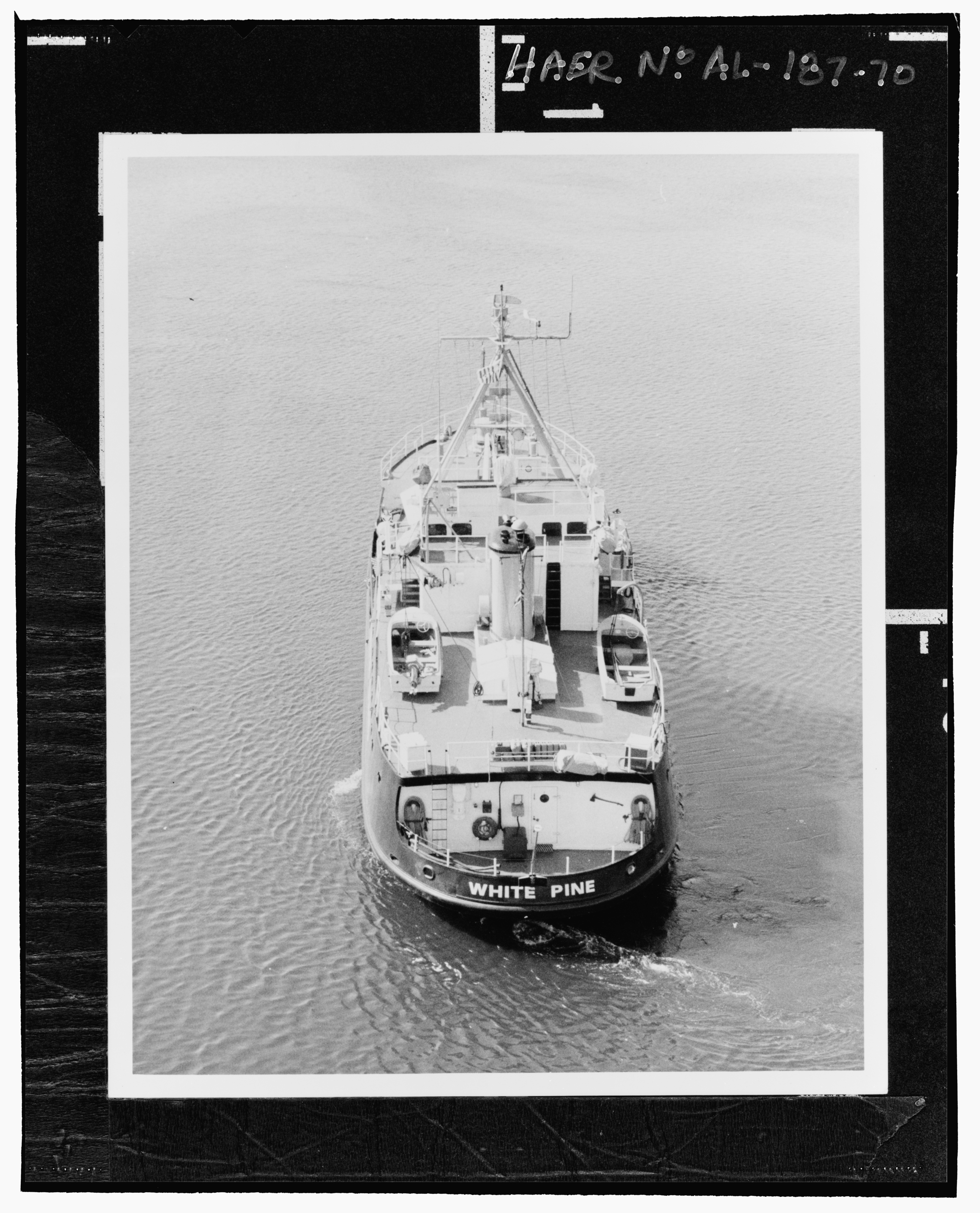
Aerial stern view of White Pine

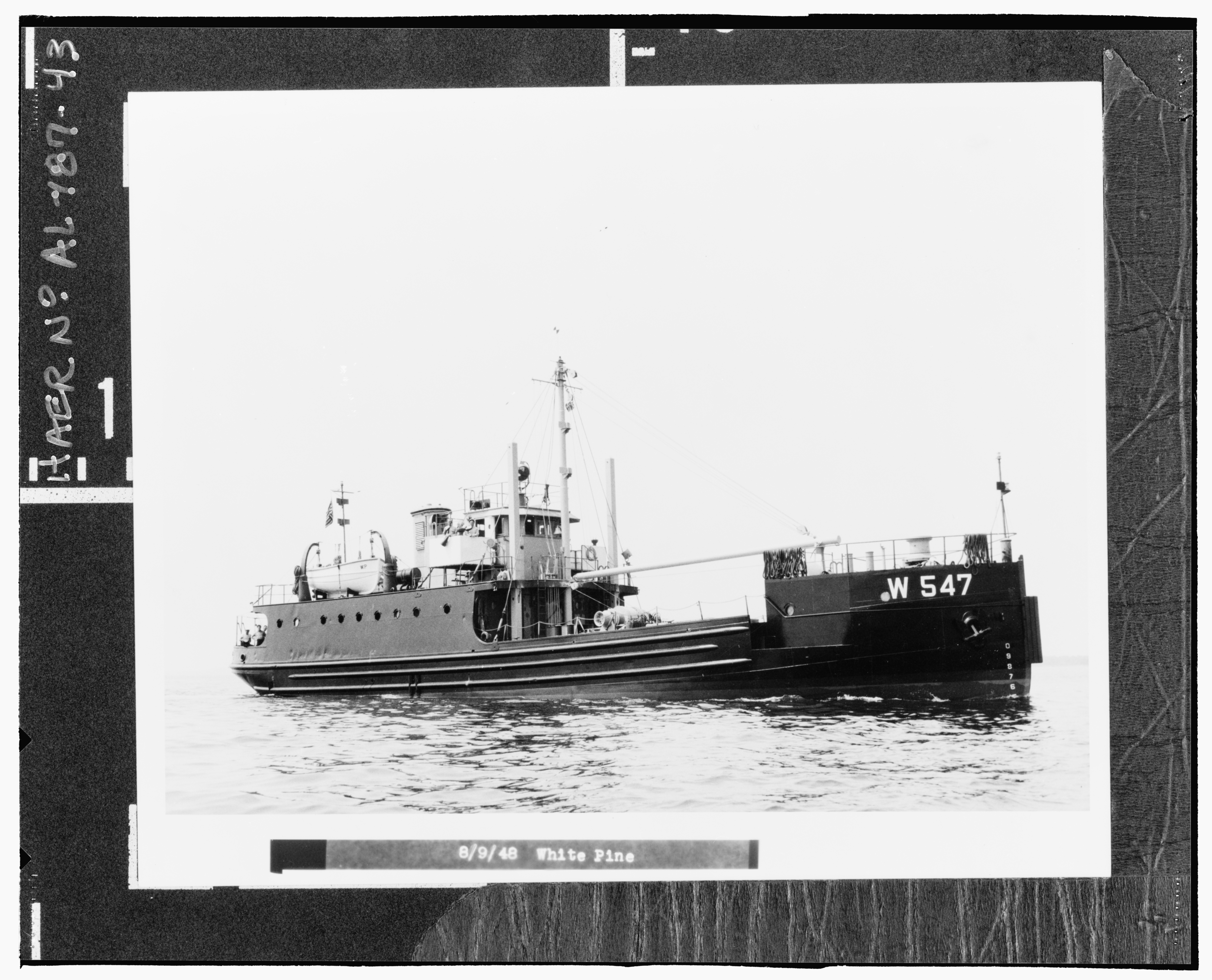
Starboard view of White Pine

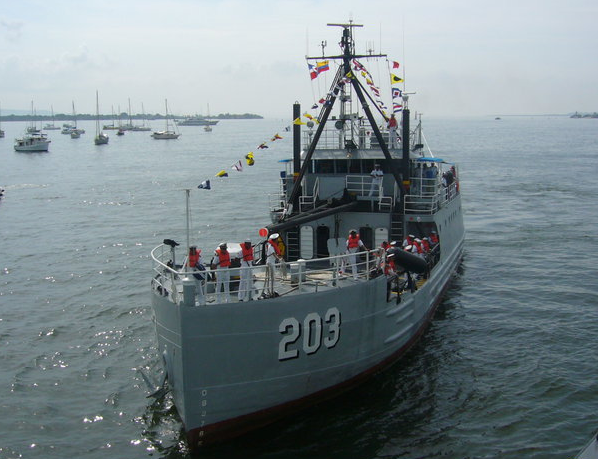
Tortuguero (PM-203) in 2010

== Awards ==
- American Campaign Medal
- World War II Victory Medal
- National Defense Service Medal
