= White-class buoy tender =

Class of buoy tenders of the United States Coast Guard

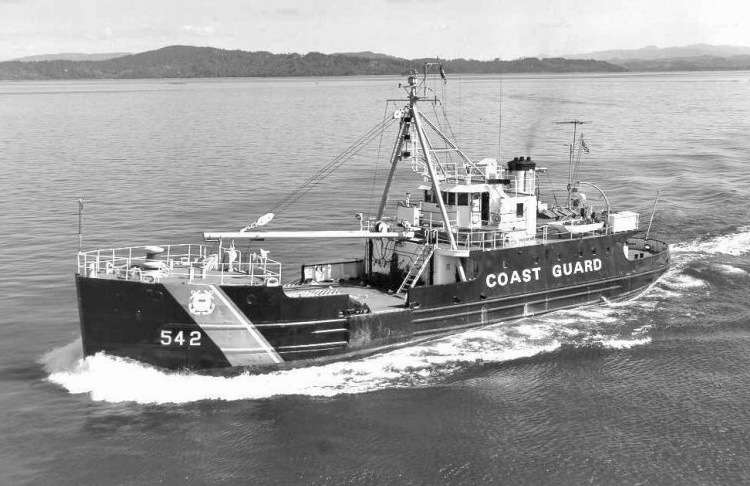
- USCGC White Bush

Class overview
- Name: White class
- Builders: Niagara Shipbuilding Co.; Basalt Rock Co.; Erie Concrete & Steel Supply Co.
- Operators: United States Coast Guard; Tunisian National Navy; Dominican Navy
- Preceded by: Eagle class
- Succeeded by: Casco class
- Built: 1944-1945
- In commission: 1947-2002
- Planned: 8
- Completed: 8
- Lost: 1
- Retired: 7

General characteristics
- Type: Buoy tender
- Displacement: 600 t (591 long tons)
- Length: 132 ft 10 in (40.49 m)
- Beam: 30 ft 0 in (9.14 m)
- Draft: 8 ft 9 in (2.67 m)
- Installed power: 2 × shafts; 3 × rudders; 600 bhp (450 kW)
- Propulsion: As built: 2 × Union diesel engines; 1974: 2 × Caterpillar D-353-E diesel engines
- Speed: 10.5 kn (19.4 km/h; 12.1 mph)
- Range: 2,450 nmi (4,540 km; 2,820 mi) at 10.5 kn (19.4 km/h; 12.1 mph); 2,830 nmi (5,240 km; 3,260 mi) at 7.5 kn (13.9 km/h; 8.6 mph)
- Complement: 1 warrant, 20 crewmen (1947)

The White-class buoy tender is a class of buoy tenders of the United States Coast Guard. Eight ships of the YF-257-class lighter were transferred from the United States Navy and were in commission from 1947 until 2002.

== Design ==
According to her Ship's Characteristics Card dated August 30, 1965, the White-class buoy tenders were 132 feet 10 inches in overall length; 132 feet in length between perpendiculars; 30 feet 9.75 inches in extreme beam; 15 feet 8 inches in depth of hold; 6 feet 2 inches in draft forward fully loaded; and 5 feet in draft forward with a light load. Their one mast was 48 feet tall. The vessel displaced 600 tons and had a maximum speed of 9.2 knots (17.0 km/h; 10.6 mph) fully loaded. Their hulls, superstructure, decks, bulkheads, and frames were constructed of steel. Auxiliary boats in 1965 included a fiberglass outboard and three seven-man inflatable lifeboats. In 1965, they had original diesel engines built by Union Diesel Engine Company, Oakland, California, with two propellers, 300 horsepower (220 kW) each, and two auxiliary diesel generators.

They underwent a major renovation at the United States Coast Guard Yard in Curtis Bay, Baltimore, Maryland during the 1960s and 70s. These modifications included updated equipment to improve her AtoN capabilities. Before decommissioning, White Pine's length was 133 feet; beam, 31 feet; and draft, 8 feet. Her displacement tonnage was listed at 606 gross tons and her mast height as 37.5 feet. She had a lifting capacity of 20,000 pounds, using two hydraulic pumps. She had twin Caterpillar diesel engines, 375 horsepower each, twin propellers, and Detroit Diesel auxiliary generators. Cruising capacity was 10 knots. Her maximum time out to sea was twenty days at 8 knots. Her complement of officers and crew was 26.

== Ships in the class ==
White-class buoy tender							
Hull no.	Name	Builder	Laid down	Launched	Commissioned	Decommissioned	Fate
WAGL-540 / WLM-540	White Sumac	Niagara Shipbuilding Co.	1942	1943	19 September 1947	1 August 2002	Transferred to Dominican Republic as Capotillo (BA-2), 2002
WAGL-541 / WLM-541	White Alder	Niagara Shipbuilding Co.	1942	1943	19 September 1947	-	Sank after collision on 7 December 1968
WAGL-542 / WLM-542	White Bush	Basalt Rock Co.	1943	1944	11 August 1947	16 September 1985	Returned to US Navy as USS White Bush (IX-542), 1985
WAGL-543 / WLM-543	White Holly	Basalt Rock Co.	3 August 1943	8 April 1944	1 December 1947	30 September 1998	Sold to merchant service as MV White Holly, 1999
WAGL-544 / WLM-544	White Sage	Erie Concrete & Steel Supply Co.	29 March 1943	19 June 1943	9 August 1947	7 June 1996	Donated to merchant service, 1999
WAGL-545 / WLM-545	White Heath	Erie Concrete & Steel Supply Co.	4 June 1943	21 July 1943	9 August 1947	31 March 1998	Transferred to Tunisia as Turgueness (A-805), 1998
WAGL-546 / WLM-546	White Lupine	Erie Concrete & Steel Supply Co.	1943	1943	5 September 1947	27 February 1998	Transferred to Tunisia as Tabarka (A-804), 1998
WAGL-547 / WLM-547	White Pine	Erie Concrete & Steel Supply Co.	12 June 1943	28 August 1943	3 August 1948	29 June 1999	Transferred to Dominican Republic as Tortuguero (BA-1), 29 June 1999
