= Eastern Air Lines Flight 375 =

1960 aviation bird strike accident

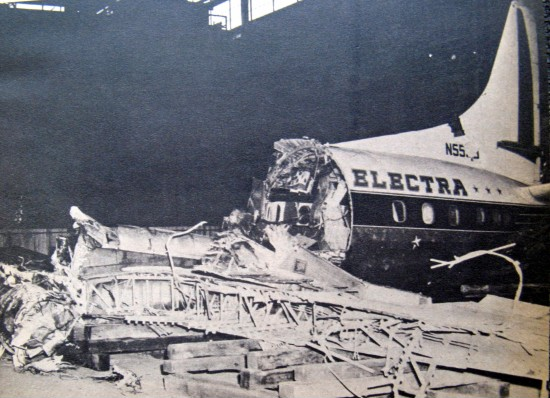
- Wreckage of the Lockheed L-188

Accident
- Date: October 4, 1960
- Summary: Bird strike leading to engine damage and aerodynamic stall
- Site: Winthrop Bay, near Logan International Airport, Boston, Massachusetts, United States; 42°21′57″N 70°59′18″W

Aircraft
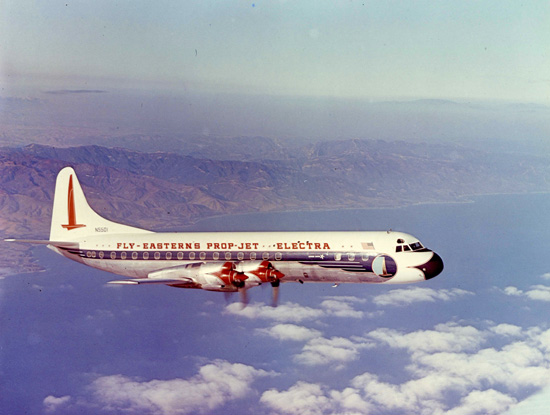
- An Eastern Airlines L-188, similar to the aircraft involved
- Aircraft type: Lockheed L-188A Electra
- Operator: Eastern Air Lines
- Registration: N5533
- Flight origin: Logan International Airport, Boston, Massachusetts
- 1st stopover: Philadelphia International Airport, Philadelphia, Pennsylvania
- 2nd stopover: Charlotte Municipal Airport, Charlotte, North Carolina
- Last stopover: Greenville Municipal Airport, Greenville, South Carolina
- Destination: Atlanta Municipal Airport, Atlanta, Georgia
- Occupants: 72
- Passengers: 67
- Crew: 5
- Fatalities: 62
- Injuries: 10
- Survivors: 10

Eastern Air Lines Flight 375, registration N5533, was a Lockheed L-188 Electra aircraft that crashed on takeoff from Logan International Airport in Boston, Massachusetts, on October 4, 1960. Ten survived, nine with serious injuries, but 62 of 72 on board were killed in the accident.

== Accident ==
N5533 and its crew came into Logan that day as Flight 444 from New York City's LaGuardia Airport. The plane and crew turned around in Boston as Flight 375, which was scheduled to travel to Philadelphia, Pennsylvania; Charlotte, North Carolina; and Atlanta, Georgia. The pilots had filed an IFR flight plan that would have had the aircraft cruising to Philadelphia at 10,000 feet (3,000 m). At 5:35 pm, the aircraft pulled away from the terminal and taxied to the threshold of Runway 09 for an easterly departure; the tower cleared it for takeoff at 5:39 pm.

The takeoff was normal until approximately six seconds after liftoff. At that point the aircraft encountered a large flock of starlings. The aircraft veered to the left for a moment then resumed the runway heading. At a height of about 120 feet (37 m) small birds were sucked into the engines, causing the propeller on engine one to be feathered and shut down. Engines two and four lost thrust momentarily but recovered. At a height of 200 feet (61 m) the airplane veered left again and sank nose-up to about 100 feet (30 m) in altitude. It then rolled to the left, the nose dropped, and the aircraft crashed into Winthrop Bay.

The fuselage broke into two pieces; eight passengers and two flight attendants in the rear section were thrown out of their seats and were quickly picked up by boats already in the bay. The front section sank to the bottom of the bay, taking the majority of passengers and flight crew with it. A Navy Reserve commander who arrived at the scene of the accident shortly afterwards stated many passengers were stuck in their seats and unable to get out before sinking into the bay. The entire accident sequence from the beginning of takeoff to the impact in the water took less than one minute.

== Investigation ==
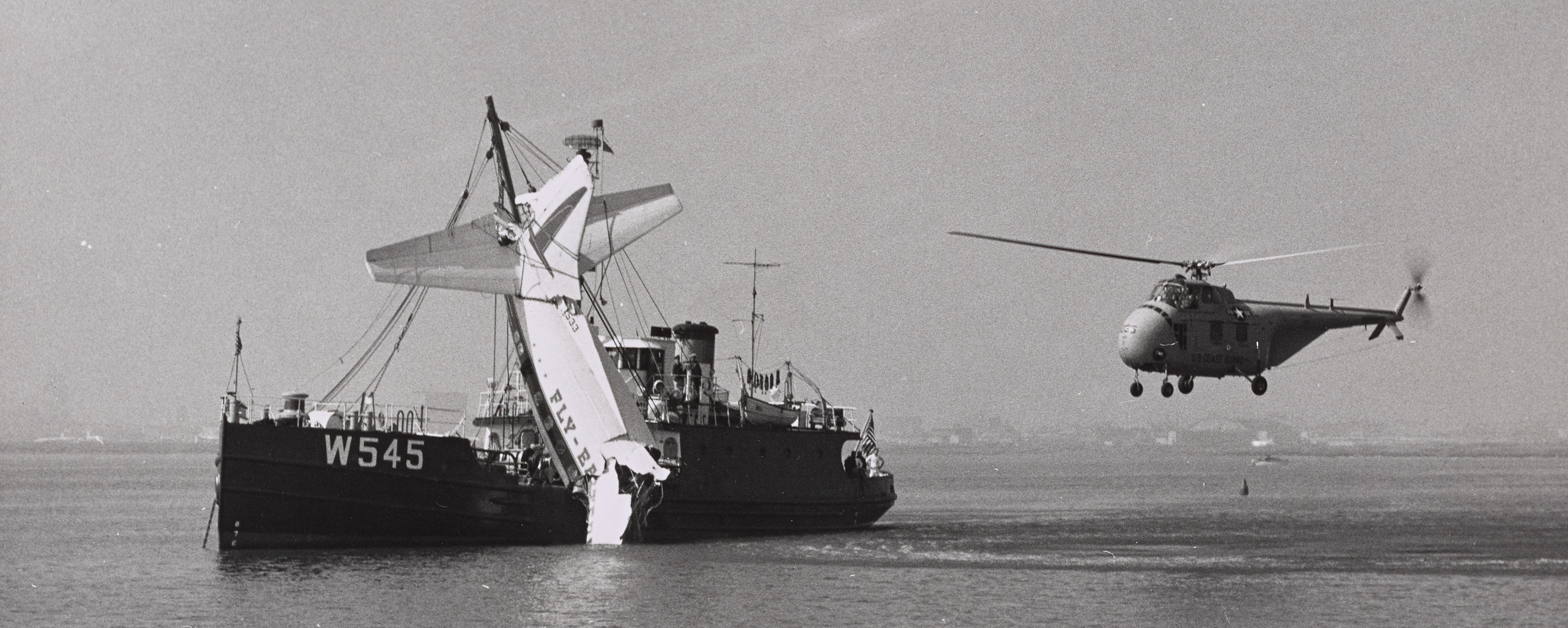
USCGC White Heath recovering Flight 375's tail section on October 5, 1960

Investigators, including Operations Group Chairman Bobbie R. Allen with the Civil Aeronautics Board (CAB, the predecessor of the NTSB) determined that engines two and four had each ingested at least one bird, and that engine one had ingested at least eight. The bird damage caused the number one propeller to autofeather and the engine to shut down at the same time that damage to engines two and four prevented them from developing full power at a critical stage of flight. The aircraft, unable to climb, went into a stall. The power interruption to the port engines probably caused the left wing to stall; the wing dropped and the aircraft crashed into the water. There was also evidence that birds had crashed into the windscreen, reducing the pilots' visibility; in addition, bird remains had clogged the pitot tubes, making the pilots' airspeed indicators unreliable.

It was eventually determined that turboprop engines such as those on the Electra were highly sensitive to damage from bird strikes. The CAB recommended to the Civil Aeronautics Administration (CAA, the predecessor of the FAA) that steps be taken to reduce the damage caused by bird strikes to turbine engines, and that ways be found to reduce the populations of birds around airports.

However, another possible factor that came to light later was a maintenance defect in the copilot's seat. During civil litigation by the family of a deceased passenger, it was discovered that the airplane's maintenance records showed that the adjustable seat had accidentally slid backward during a takeoff about six weeks prior to Flight 375. Rather than perform the proper repair of replacing a metal rod, a mechanic used a strand of wire. A subsequent maintenance check on September 19 showed that the copilot's seat would not lock in any position; it was left in that condition. Expert testimony during the trial claimed that the co-pilot of Flight 375 (who during an emergency would typically be flying the plane while the pilot attempts to locate and solve the problem) most likely pushed the rudder pedal to compensate for unexpected yaw. In doing so, it was surmised that this foot pressure caused the seat to slide backward, which caused him to inadvertently pull back on the yoke. This nose-up condition could have been the decisive stall that caused the final plunge into the water.

== See also ==
- List of accidents and incidents involving commercial aircraft
- List of disasters in Massachusetts by death toll
