= USCGC White Bush =

YF-257-class of the United States Navy

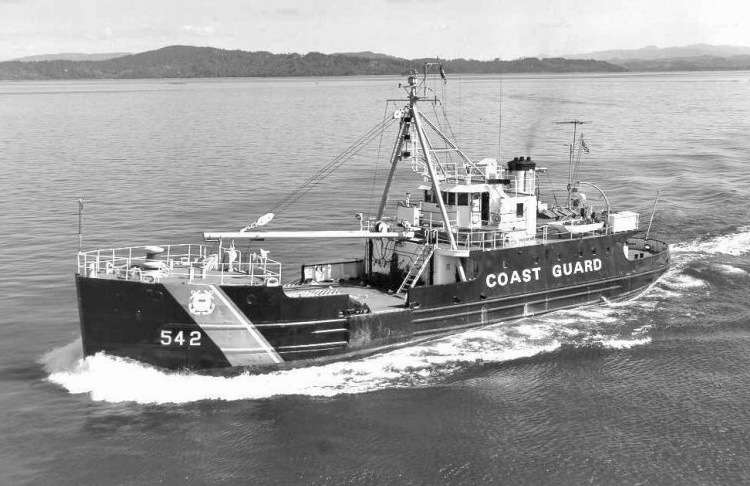
- USCGC White Bush

History

United States
- Name: YF-339
- Builder: Basalt Rock Co.
- Commissioned: May 1944
- Decommissioned: 11 August 1947
- Reclassified: IX-542, 1985
- Fate: Transferred to US Coast Guard, 11 August 1947

History

United States
- Name: White Bush
- Namesake: White Bush
- Acquired: 11 August 1947
- Commissioned: 1 November 1947
- Decommissioned: 16 September 1985
- Identification: Hull number: WAGL-542
- Reclassified: WLM-542, 1960s
- Home port: Astoria
- Fate: Returned to US Navy, 16 September 1985; Sunk as target, 17 June 2004

General characteristics
- Class & type: YF-257-class lighter; White-class buoy tender
- Displacement: 600 t (591 long tons)
- Length: 132 ft 10 in (40.49 m)
- Beam: 30 ft 0 in (9.14 m)
- Draft: 8 ft 9 in (2.67 m)
- Installed power: 2 × shafts; 3 × rudders; 600 bhp (450 kW)
- Propulsion: As built: 2 × Union diesel engines; 1974: 2 × Caterpillar D-353-E diesel engines
- Speed: 10.5 kn (19.4 km/h; 12.1 mph)
- Range: 2,450 nmi (4,540 km; 2,820 mi) at 10.5 kn (19.4 km/h; 12.1 mph); 2,830 nmi (5,240 km; 3,260 mi) at 7.5 kn (13.9 km/h; 8.6 mph)
- Complement: 1 warrant, 20 crewmen (1947)

USS YF-339 was an American YF-257-class covered lighter built in 1944 for service in World War II. She was later acquired by the United States Coast Guard and renamed USCGC White Bush (WAGL-542).

== Construction and career ==
YF-339 was built by the Basalt Rock Company, in Napa, California along with 10 other vessels of the same class. She was commissioned in May 1944 and was used by the Navy as an ammunition carrier, minelayer and general freighter until 1947 when she was decommissioned and transferred to the US Coast Guard on 11 August 1947. On 1 November 1947 she was formally commissioned as a Coast Guard cutter and was christened White Bush and given the hull designation WAGL-542. She was then sent to the Coast Guard Yard for to be fitted out as a buoy tender. Her deck arrangement was converted to include a large derrick to handle buoys and her upper deck was extended.

She was assigned to the 13th Coast Guard District and was home-ported in Astoria, Oregon where she was assigned to service aids to navigation and conduct law enforcement and search and rescue patrols when necessary. Her primary area of responsibility included Grays Harbor, Washington to Coos Bay, Oregon and she serviced aids to navigation on the Columbia River as well. Her assignment included servicing 76 lighted buoys, 26 unlighted buoys, 60 lights, and 29 daybeacons.

On 4 August 1951, she assisted following a collision between the MV Adventure and Tullahoma near Astoria. On 20 December 1951, she helped fight a fire on the MV Erria off Tongue Point. On 26 December 1951, she assisted the FV Susan. On 7 May 1952, she repaired a cable to Tillamook Rock. On 23 September 1954, she repaired a cable to Destruction Island. From 8 to 9 June 1961, she assisted with flood relief in the Vancouver-Longview area. While starting out to sea across the Columbia River Bar on 4 December 1963 she encountered three consecutive swells approximately twenty feet high and nearly cresting. The White Bush stopped her main engines but the "seas rocked and worked her heavily," causing some structural damage. She returned to her berth to await repairs. In August 1965, she fought a fire on the dredge MacLeod at Vancouver.

In 1972, she had pollution abatement equipment installed at the Lockheed Shipbuilding and Construction Company in Seattle, Washington. In 1974 she underwent a modernization where her original diesel engines were replaced with new Caterpillar D-353-E diesel engines which had a full load RMP of 1225, driving the shafts at 400 RPM through twin disc reduction gears. She also had new General Motors 4-71 diesel generators installed and her galley, messing, berthing and living spaces were renovated. On 1 October 1975, she helped fight a dock fire in the Astoria waterfront area.

In 1977, the final phase of her updating and modernization was completed with the removal of her old pilothouse and the installation of a "new, modern, spacious," pilothouse. In May 1977, she was assigned to fisheries enforcement duty off the coast of Oregon that consisted of enforcing government regulations concerning catch limits, gear restrictions and other orders pertaining to the annual salmon catch for both commercial and sport fishermen.

She was decommissioned on 16 September 1985 and returned to the custody of the United States Navy. She was re-designated as IX-542 and laid up in reserve. The ship was sunk as a target on 17 June 2004.
