= USCGC White Heath =

White-class buoy tender of the United States Coast Guard

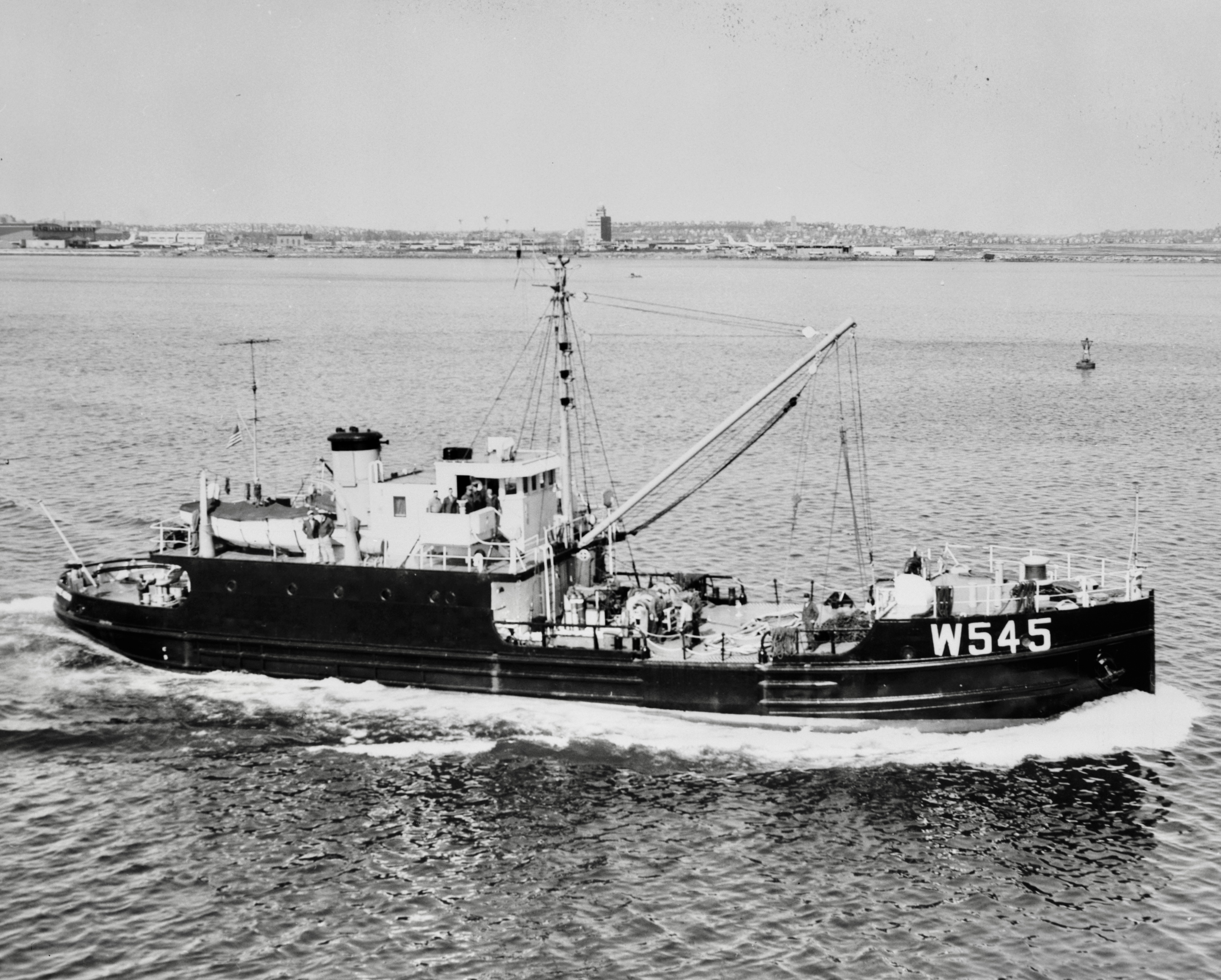
- USCGC White Heath in 1960

History

United States
- Name: YF-445
- Builder: Erie Concrete and Steel Supply Company
- Laid down: 4 June 1943
- Launched: 21 July 1943
- Commissioned: 9 August 1944
- Decommissioned: 1946
- Fate: Transferred to US Coast Guard

History

United States
- Name: White Heath
- Namesake: White Heath
- Commissioned: 9 August 1947
- Decommissioned: 31 March 1998
- Reclassified: WLM-545
- Identification: Hull number: WAGL-545; Callsign: NAQE
- Fate: Sold to Tunisia, 1998

History

Tunisia
- Name: Turgueness
- Acquired: 1998
- Home port: Bizerte
- Identification: Pennant number: A-805

General characteristics
- Class & type: YF-257-class lighter; White-class buoy tender
- Displacement: 476 t (468 long tons)
- Length: 132 ft 10 in (40.49 m)
- Beam: 30 ft 0 in (9.14 m)
- Draft: 8 ft (2.4 m)
- Installed power: 600 bhp (450 kW)
- Propulsion: As built: 2 × Union diesel engines; 1977: 2 × Caterpillar D-353-E diesel engines
- Speed: 10.5 kn (19.4 km/h; 12.1 mph)
- Range: 3,200 nmi (5,900 km; 3,700 mi) at 7.5 kn (13.9 km/h; 8.6 mph)
- Complement: 1 warrant officer, 20 crewmen

USS YF-445 was a U.S. Navy covered lighter built in 1943 for service in World War II. Her most significant action during the war was to supply ships with food and water at the landing beaches of Operation Dragoon, the allied invasion of Southern France in 1944.

After the war, she was decommissioned by the Navy and transferred to the United States Coast Guard. There she became the White-class buoy tender USCGC White Heath (WAGL/WLM-545).

White Heath was decommissioned by the Coast Guard in 1998 and transferred to the Tunisian Navy, which renamed her Turgueness.

== Construction and characteristics ==
During World War II, the U.S. Navy built at least 76 YF-257-class covered lighters. The purpose of this class was to transport cargo to and from deep-draft ocean-going ships to small ports which were too shallow to admit the larger vessels. They were built with ample cargo space in their hold, an open deck to carry larger items, a crane to move cargo on and off the vessel, and with shallow draft allowing them to go where the large ships could not. These design features were all useful in YF-445's later life as a buoy tender.

YF-445 was one of at least twelve YF-257-class lighters built by the Erie Concrete & Steel Supply Company at its Erie, Pennsylvania shipyard. The shipyard was established in June 1941, and had never built a ship when it won its first Navy contract in 1941. Since major shipyards were building combatant and merchant ships, the Navy recruited a new class of emergency shipbuilders, of which Erie Concrete & Steel Supply was one, for less critical auxiliary vessels. While in the fiscal year ended 30 June 1940 only 12 private shipyards were building Navy ships, a year later there were 109. YF-445 was the fourteenth vessel built by the company.

Erie Concrete and Steel Supply built YFs 444-448 under contract NXs156. YF-445 was laid down on 4 June 1943. She was launched on 21 July 1943 and was christened by Mrs. H. McKay Birmingham, the wife of a shipyard worker.

=== As built in 1943 ===
YF-445's hull was constructed of welded steel plates. The ship was 132 feet 10 inches (40.49 m) long, with a beam of 30 feet (9.1 m), and a fully loaded draft of 8 feet (2.4 m). She displaced 476 tons loaded.

YF-445 had two opposed-piston Fairbanks-Morse Diesel engines built by Union Diesel Engine Company of Oakland, California each of which generated 300 horsepower. These drove two four-bladed propellers which were 48 inches (1.2 m) in diameter. This power plant gave her a maximum speed of 10.5 knots, and a cruising speed of 7.5 knots. Her tanks held 12,500 U.S. gallons (47,000 L) of Diesel fuel, giving her a range of 3,200 nautical miles at cruising speed.

Electrical power aboard was provided by two Cummins 60 Kw generators.

The ship had a single mast and a single boom which were used as a derrick. The main hoist was driven by electric winches which were mounted on her foredeck.

The Navy's specifications for YF-445 and her sisterships included removable mine-laying tracks, allowing the vessel to carry up to 64 Mark VI mines. While it appears that YF-445 was never used in this capacity, her class was sometimes referred to as "mine-layers."

=== Modifications for Coast Guard service ===
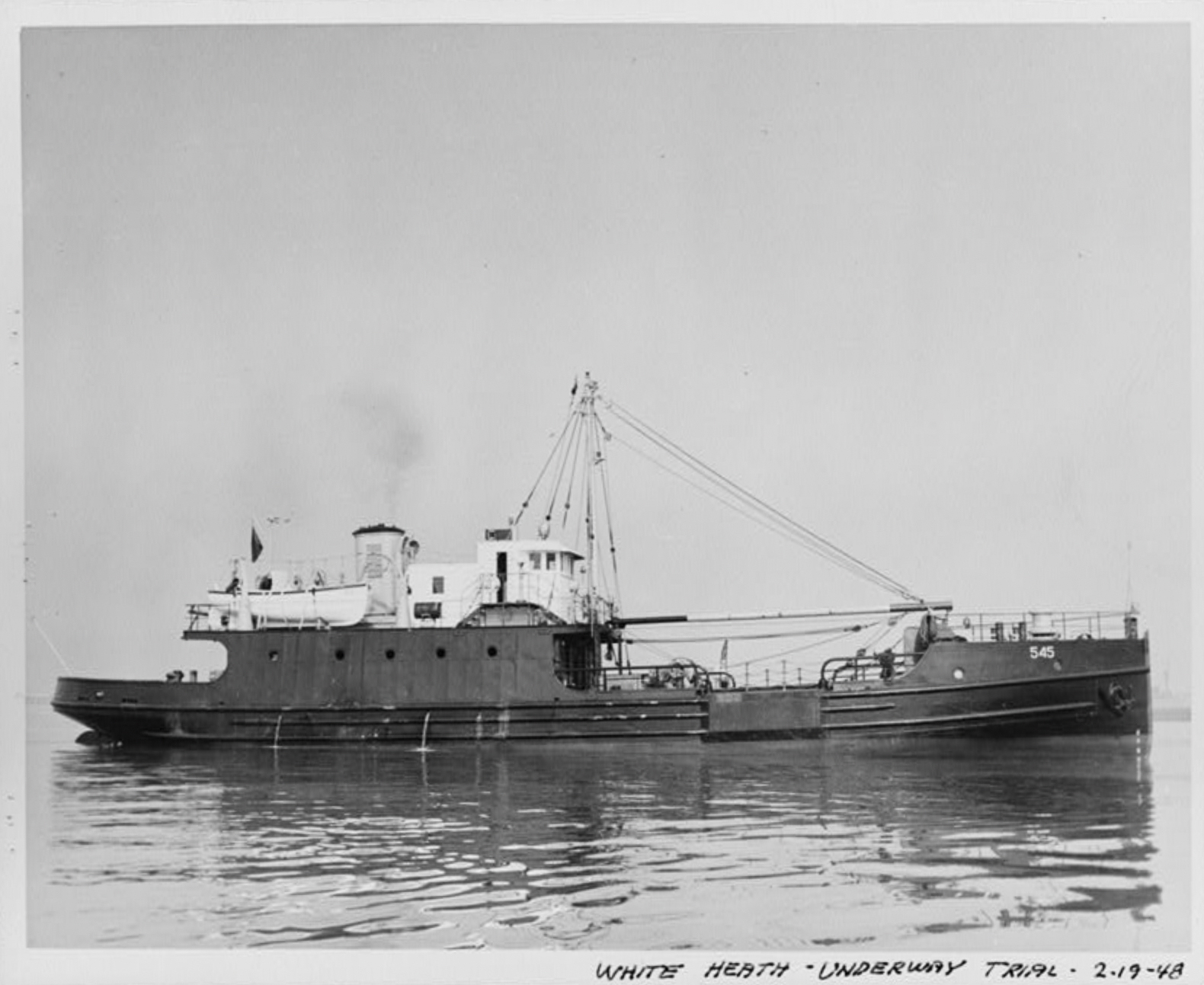
White Heath in 1948, likely just after her conversion at the Coast Guard Yard

Shortly after her acquisition by the Coast Guard in 1946 or 1947, YF-445 was sent to the Coast Guard Yard in Curtis Bay, Maryland for conversion into a buoy tender. The changes were modest as the ship was well suited to her new role in many respects. Among the changes which were made, were the removal of her machine guns, the opening of ports to improve the habitability of her crew quarters, repainting, and the installation of a more powerful crane. In 1948, her upper deck was extended.

White Heath had neither a bow thruster nor any special hull plating for ice breaking, features of all later types of Coast Guard buoy tenders.

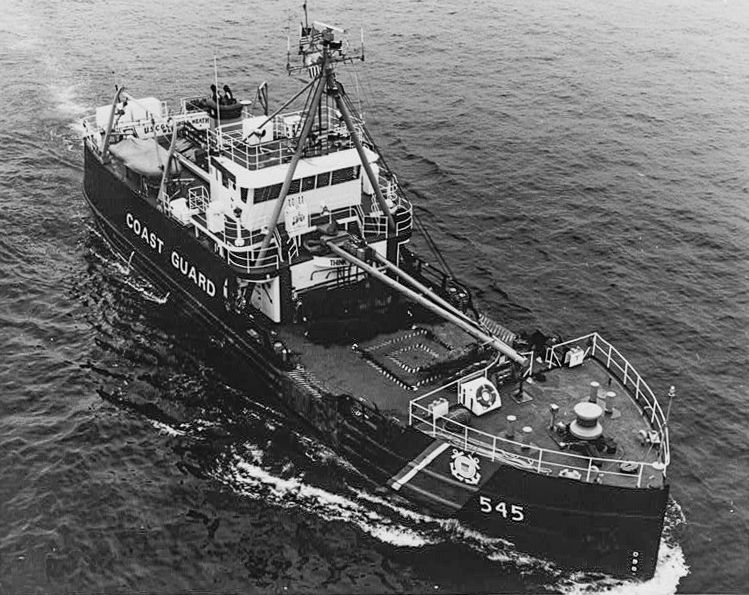
White Heath in 1987. Note the A-frame crane system.

Sometime in the 1960s White Heath's crane system was upgraded. She was equipped with an A-frame mast, and A-frame boom, and hydraulic winches that gave her 10-ton lifting capacity. The winches were moved from the buoy deck to inside the house, giving it 1,000 square feet (93 m^{2}) of working space.

After more than three decades of service, the lack of spare parts for the ship's engines and her obsolete 120-volt DC electrical system caused breakdowns and higher repair costs. White Heath's engines, generators and electrical system were replaced at the Coast Guard Yard. The ship was in the yard between 25 November 1976 and 19 September 1977. White Heath's new main engines were 6-cylinder Caterpillar D-353-E, which produced 330 horsepower each.

From 1948 through at least 1977 the ship was commanded by a warrant officer and had 20 enlisted sailors. By 1993 her complement had grown to 1 warrant officer and 23 enlisted personnel.

== U.S. Navy service ==
On 3 July 1944, YF-445 arrived at the Naval Frontier Base at Staten Island, New York. On 11 July 1944 YF-445 and sistership YF-447 left New York under tow by USS Abnaki. They reached Oran, Algeria on 29 July 1944. On arrival, a crew was recruited and trained, and three 20mm cannons were installed. She was commissioned on 9 August 1944.

YF-445 was assigned to the Alpha Attack Force under Rear Admiral Frank J. Lowry for Operation Dragoon, the invasion of southern France. In August 1944, she was part of the "Mothership" unit that was anchored 500 yards off Red Beach. She had four 625-cubic foot refrigerators and a potable water distilling plant aboard to supply food and water to the ships supporting the invasion. The ship earned the European-African-Middle Eastern Campaign Medal for this service.

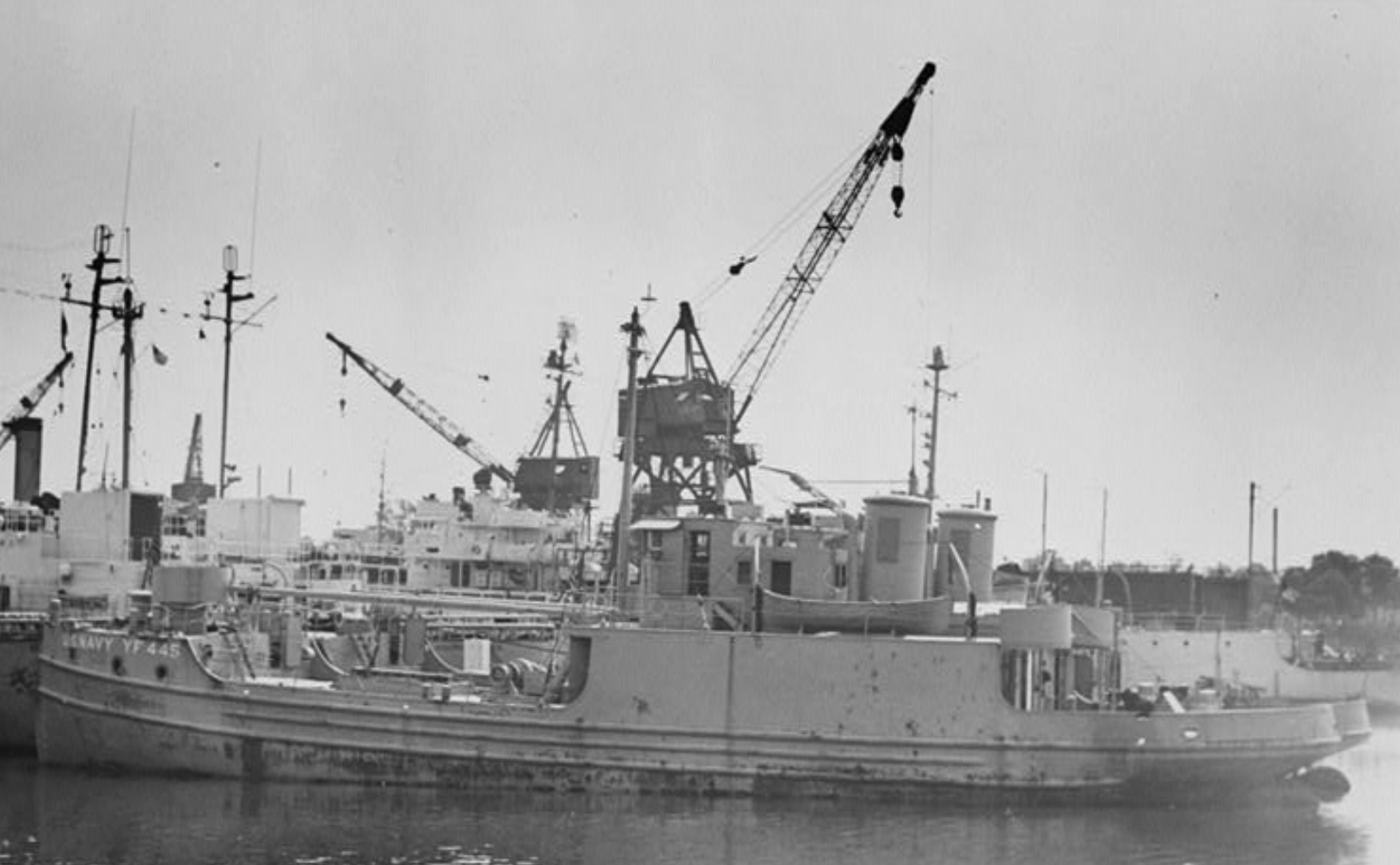
YF-445 in 1947, at the end of her Navy service

On 16 April 1945, YF-445 was detached from 8th Fleet Amphibious Group and reported for duty at Naval Operating Base Palermo, Sicily. While her fighting days were over, the Navy found use for her as a freighter. On 31 August 1945 the ship departed Naples for Palermo with files and office equipment for Commander, U.S. Naval Forces, North African Waters (ComNavNAW). On 8 October 1945 YF-445 reached Palermo from Naples with a cargo of provisions aboard. On 11 October she left for Naples and returned on 17 October with another load of office equipment. She left for Naples again on 18 October and returned on 22 October 1945 with provisions from USS Wakefield.

On 22 November 1945, YF-445, with her crew aboard, was taken in tow by USS Chain at Palermo for the long trip back to the United States. After a stop in Casablanca, the two vessels arrived in Bermuda on 22 December 1945. They left there five days later, on 27 December, for Norfolk, Virginia.

== U.S. Coast Guard service ==
On 9 August 1947 White Heath was commissioned as a Coast Guard cutter. She was given the hull designation WAGL-545, which classed her as an "auxiliary vessel, lighthouse tender." This designation was changed in 1966 to WLM-545 to reflect the service's new classification scheme which regarded White Heath as a "medium or coastal buoy tender." The ship was assigned to the 1st Coast Guard District and homeported in Boston, Massachusetts. She arrived at her station no later than October 1947.

Her primary mission was maintaining buoys and other aids to navigation along the coasts of Massachusetts, New Hampshire, and Maine. Secondary roles included various public safety missions, law enforcement, and light icebreaking. In her aids-to-navigation work she would haul buoys onto her deck, to clean and paint them, and service their lights. Mooring chains were inspected and replaced, if necessary. Finally, the concrete sinkers that held the buoys in place were inspected for cracks and other damage. Winter ice would damage, sink, and move buoys off-station. White Heath worked through winter and spring to undo this damage.

While the bulk of her time was devoted to maintaining her buoys and the ship, she did participate in a variety of other missions as described below.

=== Public safety ===
The tanker Ventura collided with the trawler Lynn in Boston Harbor on 28 November 1951. Lynn sank immediately with 17 crew aboard. White Heath was dispatched to search for survivors.

The 600-foot long Greek freighter Stamatios Gembiricos was anchored in Boston Harbor on 21 January 1963 when the wind increased to 35 miles per hour. Her anchor began to drag and the drifting vessel threatened Deer Island Light and other ships in the anchorage. Her captain radioed for assistance and White Heath was one of the five ships dispatched to tow the ship away from danger.

In August 1967, the volunteer fire department of Cranberry Isles, Maine bought a new fire truck. Regrettably, there was no ferry large enough to deliver it. White Heath hoisted it onto her buoy deck on the mainland, and hoisted it off again on its new island home.

=== Salvage ===
White Heath's combination of shallow draft and a 10-ton crane made her the Coast Guard's choice for a number of salvage efforts over the course of her career.

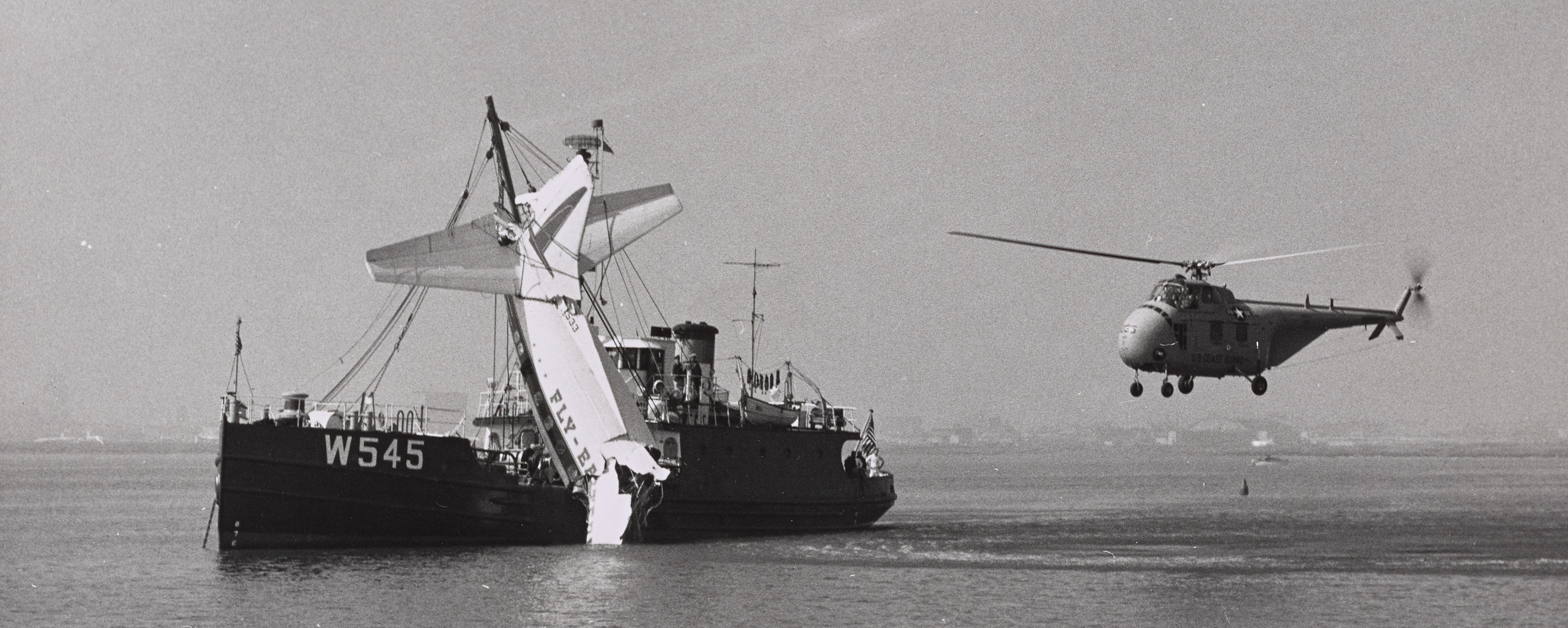
White Heath recovering the tail section of Eastern flight 375 in 1960

On 18 May 1957 a Coast Guard Gruman Albatross crashed during an Armed Forces Day demonstration in Salem Harbor. White Heath recovered the wreck from the bottom of the bay.

Eastern Air Lines Flight 375, a four-engine Lockheed Electra, crashed on take-off at Boston Logan Airport on 4 October 1960. White Heath recovered major portions of the wreckage.

The ship raised a sunken 30-foot Coast Guard crash boat in Salem Harbor in September 1968 after it was involved in several accidents.

White Heath recovered the wreck of a Provincetown-Boston Airlines Cessna 402 that crashed en route to Boston Logan Airport in July 1984.

=== Public outreach ===
The Coast Guard offered tours aboard White Heath on several occasions. These included:

- Armed Forces Day in Boston in May 1960, and 1966.
- Boston Harborfest '82 and '84 over the 4th of July weekend

=== Honors and awards ===
During her coast guard service, White Heath earned two Coast Guard Meritorious Unit Commendations, one in 1986 and one in 1990.

=== Decommissioning and transfer ===
White Heath was decommissioned on 31 March 1998. Under the Foreign Assistance Act of 1961, surplus military equipment could be transferred to other countries through the Excess Defense Articles program to support U.S. foreign policy objectives. White Heath was transferred to the Tunisian Navy through this program on 10 June 1998.

== Tunisian Navy service ==
White Heath was renamed Turgueness and given the pennant number A-805. She and the former USCGC White Lupine are now the two-ship Tabarka-class of the Tunisian Navy.
