= USCGC White Lupine =

White-class buoy tender of the United States Coast Guard

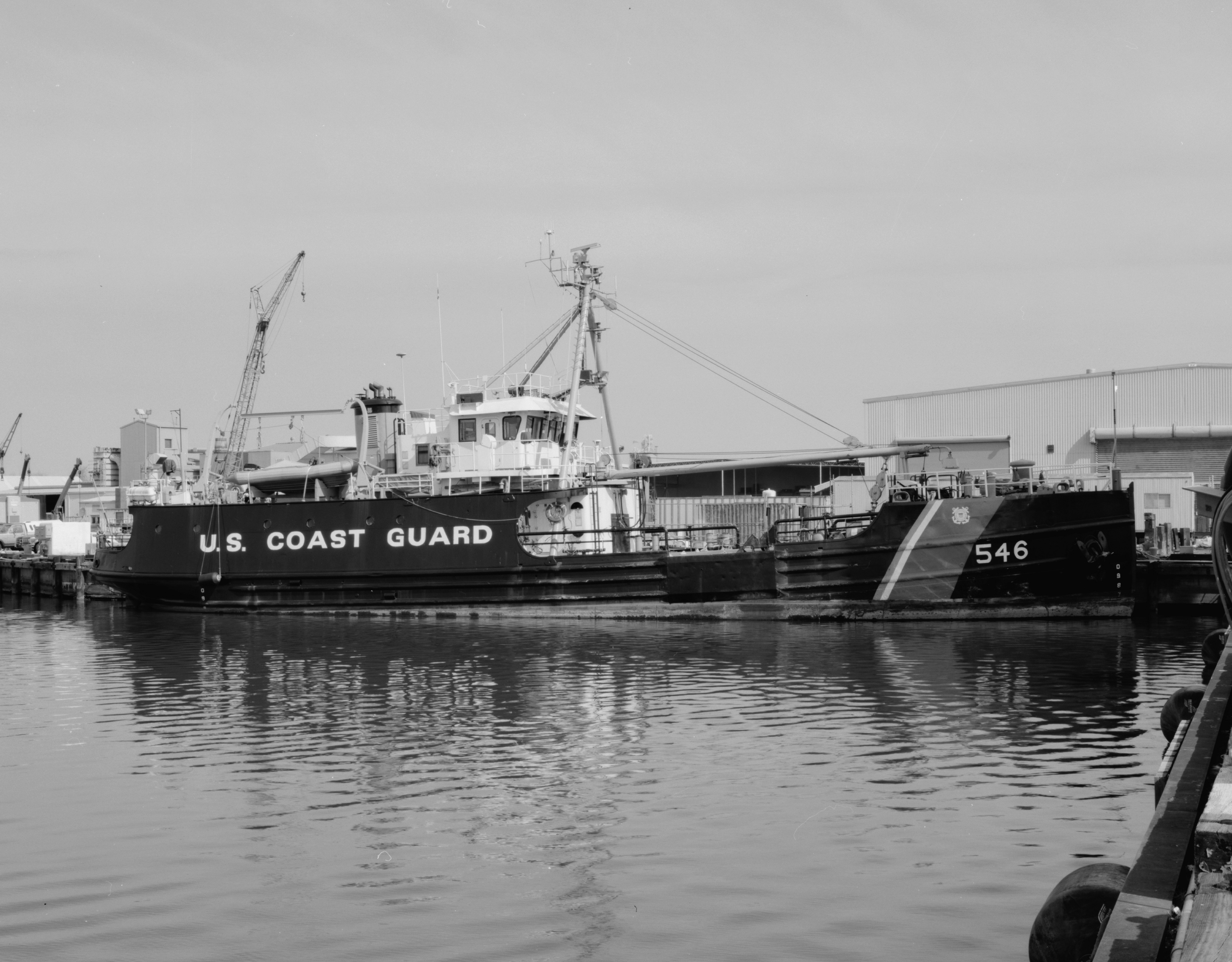
- USCGC White Lupine

History

United States
- Name: YF-446
- Builder: Erie Concrete & Steel Supply Co.
- Laid down: 1943
- Launched: 1943
- Commissioned: 31 May 1944
- Decommissioned: 1946
- Stricken: 17 July 1947
- Identification: Callsign: NARO
- Honors and awards: See Awards
- Fate: Transferred to US Coast Guard, 1946

History

United States
- Name: White Lupine
- Namesake: White Lupine
- Acquired: 1946
- Commissioned: 5 September 1947
- Decommissioned: 27 February 1998
- Reclassified: WLM-546, 1960s
- Identification: Hull number: WAGL-546
- Fate: Sold to Tunisia, 1998

History

Tunisia
- Name: Tabarka; (طبرقة)
- Namesake: Tabarka
- Acquired: 1998
- Commissioned: 10 June 1998
- Home port: Bizerte
- Identification: Pennant number: A-804
- Status: Active

General characteristics
- Class & type: YF-257-class lighter; White-class buoy tender
- Displacement: 600 t (591 long tons)
- Length: 132 ft 10 in (40.49 m)
- Beam: 30 ft 0 in (9.14 m)
- Draft: 8 ft 9 in (2.67 m)
- Installed power: 2 × shafts; 3 × rudders; 600 bhp (450 kW)
- Propulsion: As built: 2 × Union diesel engines; 1974: 2 × Caterpillar D-353-E diesel engines
- Speed: 10.5 kn (19.4 km/h; 12.1 mph)
- Range: 2,450 nmi (4,540 km; 2,820 mi) at 10.5 kn (19.4 km/h; 12.1 mph); 2,830 nmi (5,240 km; 3,260 mi) at 7.5 kn (13.9 km/h; 8.6 mph)
- Complement: 1 warrant, 20 crewmen (1947)

USS YF-446 was an American YF-257-class covered lighter built in 1943 for service in World War II. She was later acquired by the United States Coast Guard and renamed USCGC White Lupine (WAGL-546).

== Construction and career ==
YF-446 was laid down by the Erie Concrete & Steel Supply Co., in Erie, Pennsylvania in 1943. She was launched in 1943. Her trials were held on Lake Erie on 26 April 1944, and she was commissioned on 31 May 1944, with a single mast and boom hoist. Assigned to Naval Station New Orleans. At the cessation of hostilities YF-446 was assigned to the 16th Fleet in Texas for decommissioning and storage.

On 17 July 1947, YF-446 was stricken from the Naval Register and transferred to the Coast Guard. She was then converted for use as a buoy tender and entered commissioned service on 5 September 1947. She was assigned to the 9th Coast Guard District and was based out of Detroit, Michigan. She was assigned to tend aids to navigation and conduct search and rescue, limited ice-breaking, and law enforcement duties when needed.

On 18 October 1951, she assisted following a collision between the M/Vs George F. Rand and Harvey H. Brown off Port Huron, Michigan. On 24 May 1952, she assisted the yacht Judy Lane, and on 20 April 1956 she assisted following a collision between the M/Vs A. M. Byers and E. M. Ford off Sans Souci, Michigan.

She transferred to Ogdensburg, New York and carried out her duties on Lake Ontario. On 28 September 1962, she assisted the tug Russel towing a barge 10 miles northeast of Rochester, New York. She transferred in November 1967, to the First Coast Guard District and was based out of Rockland, Maine, arriving there on 17 November 1967. Here she was responsible for maintaining 417 buoys along the coast of Maine from Portland to Calais at the Canadian border. She also serviced buoys on several of the major rivers in Maine including the Penobscot, Kennebec, Damariscott, New Meadows, Sheepscot, and Saint Croix. She also delivered supplies, fuel and water to families living at various lighthouses. Her last delivery to such a location was when she delivered supplies to the crew at Fog Station Manana Island in 1996 while they were solarizing the fog signal. She sustained minor damage on 16 January 1970, when she touched bottom near Whaleback Ledge, Maine. She assisted in fighting a fire aboard the F/V Rumble Fish on 5 October 1987 and then towed the F/V to safety.

She was decommissioned on 27 February 1998 and was transferred to the government of Tunisia who commissioned her Tabarka (A-804) on 10 June 1998.

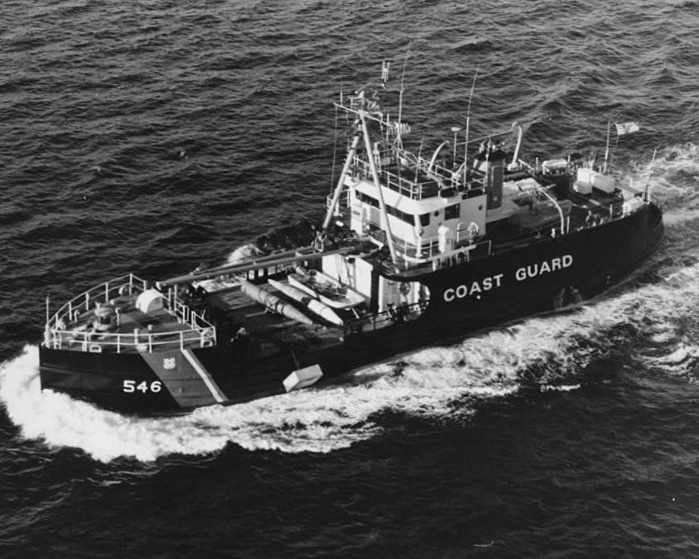
Aerial portside view of White Lupine

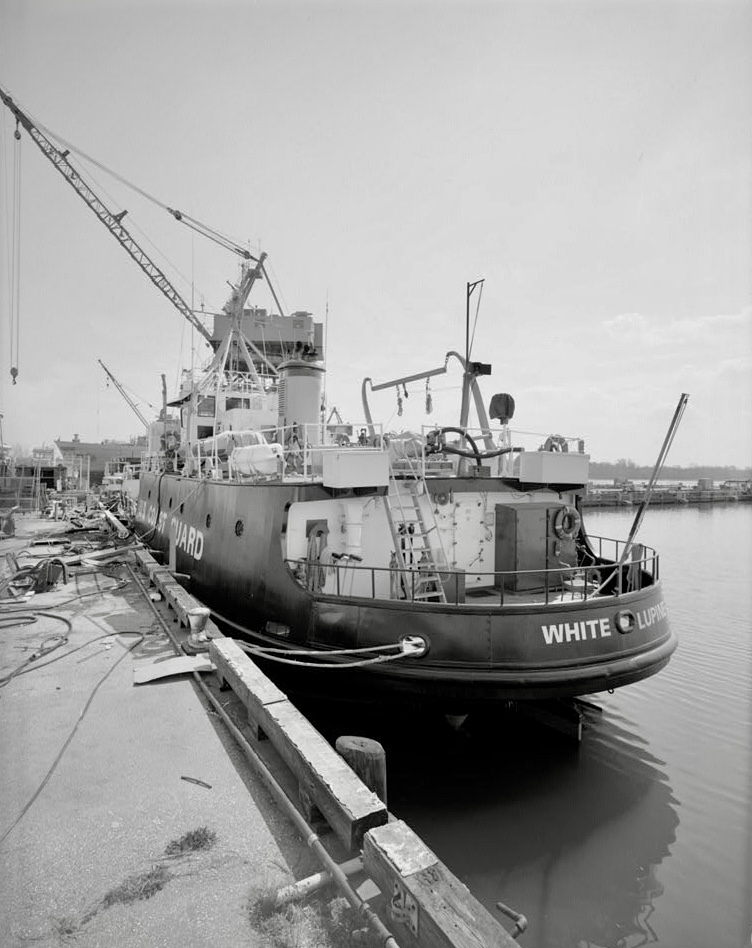
Stern view of White Lupine

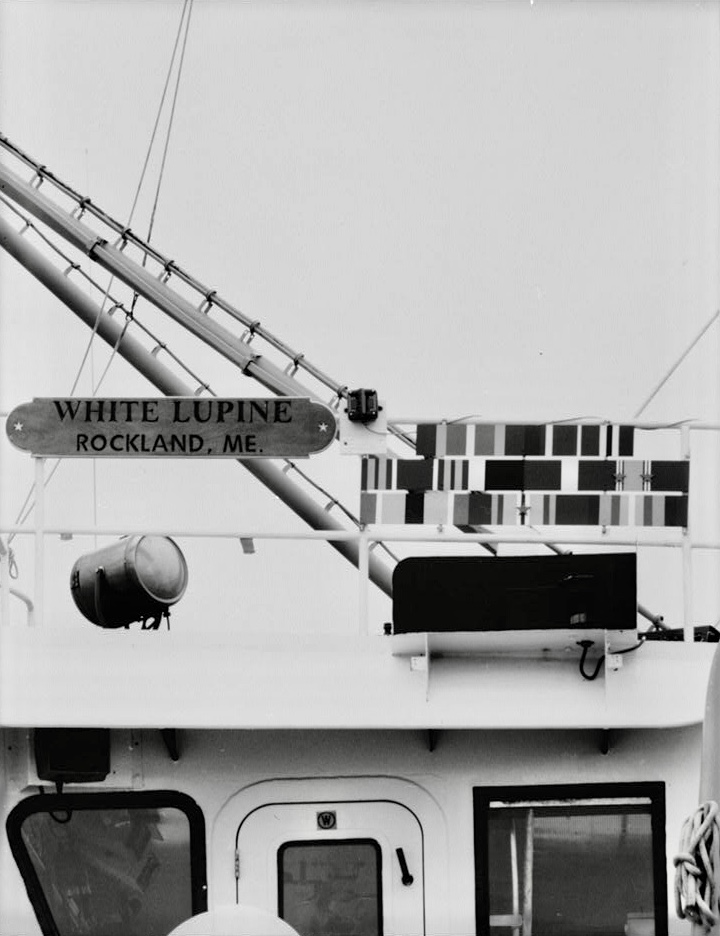
White Lupine's ribbons and awards

== Awards ==
- American Campaign Medal
- World War II Victory Medal
- National Defense Service Medal
- Coast Guard Unit Commendation Medal
- Humanitarian Service Medal
