= USCGC Buttonwood =

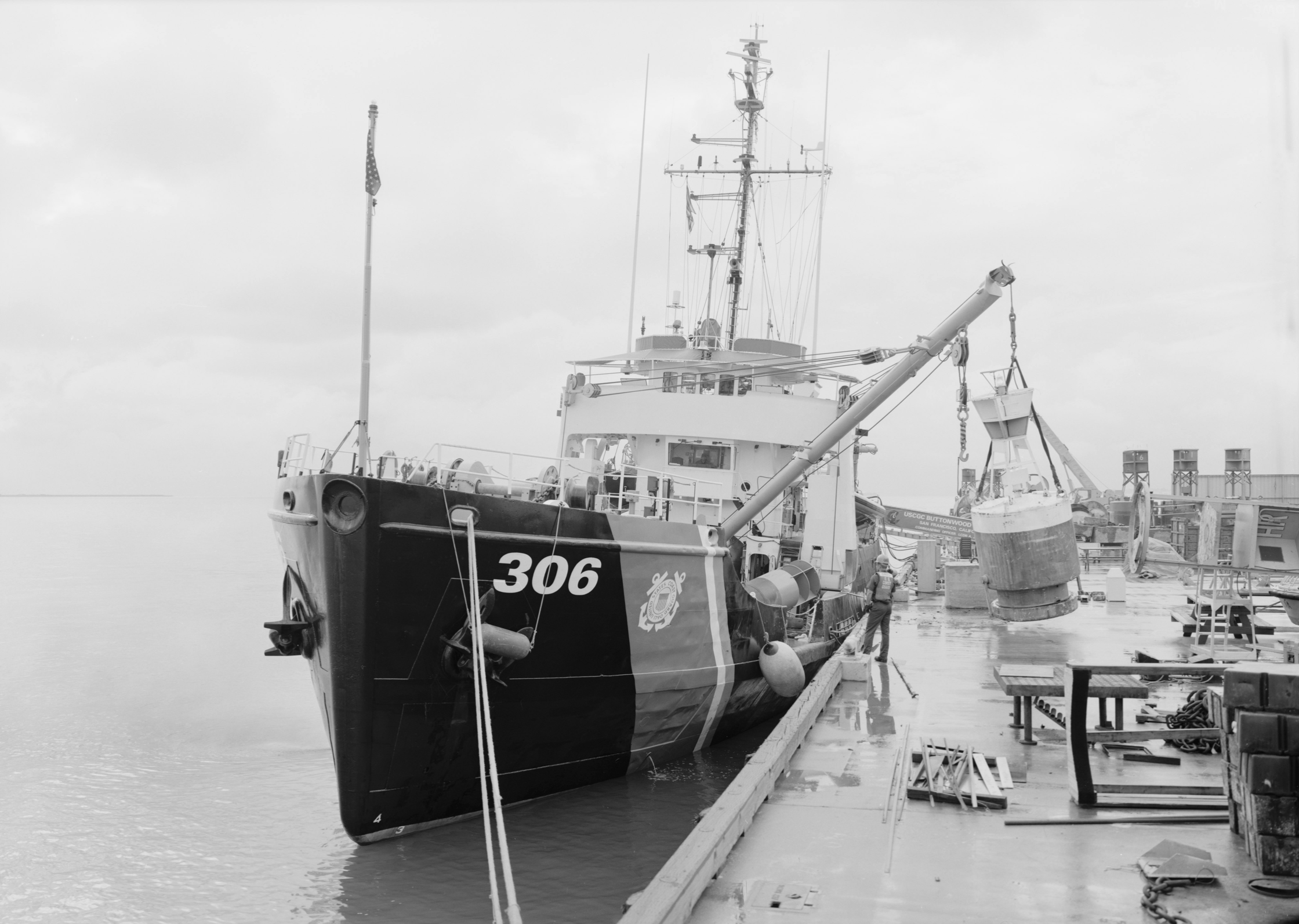
- USCGC Buttonwood in 2000

History

United States
- Name: USCGC Buttonwood
- Builder: Marine Iron and Shipbuilding Company
- Cost: $880,018
- Laid down: October 5, 1942
- Launched: May 20, 1943
- Commissioned: September 24, 1943
- Decommissioned: June 28, 2001
- Identification: Signal letters NRPX
- Fate: Transferred to Dominican Republic Navy

Dominican Republic
- Name: Almirante Didiez Burgos
- Operator: Dominican Republic Navy
- Acquired: June 30, 2001
- Home port: Santo Domingo
- Status: Active

General characteristics as built in 1943
- Displacement: 935 tons
- Length: 180 ft (55 m)
- Beam: 37 ft (11 m)
- Draft: 12 ft (3.7 m)
- Installed power: 2 x Cooper-Bessemer GN-8 Diesel engines
- Propulsion: 1 propeller
- Speed: 13.5 kn (25.0 km/h; 15.5 mph)
- Range: 8,000 nmi (15,000 km; 9,200 mi) at 13 kn (24 km/h; 15 mph)
- Complement: 6 Officers; 74 Enlisted
- Armament: 3"/50 gun; 2 x 20mm gun; Depth charges

USCGC Buttonwood (WAGL-306/WLB-306) was a Mesquite-class sea-going buoy tender operated by the United States Coast Guard. She served in World War II as well as a variety of domestic missions. After decommissioning she was acquired by the Dominican Republic Navy and renamed Almirante Didiez Burgos. She is still active as the flagship of the Dominican Navy.

== Construction and characteristics ==
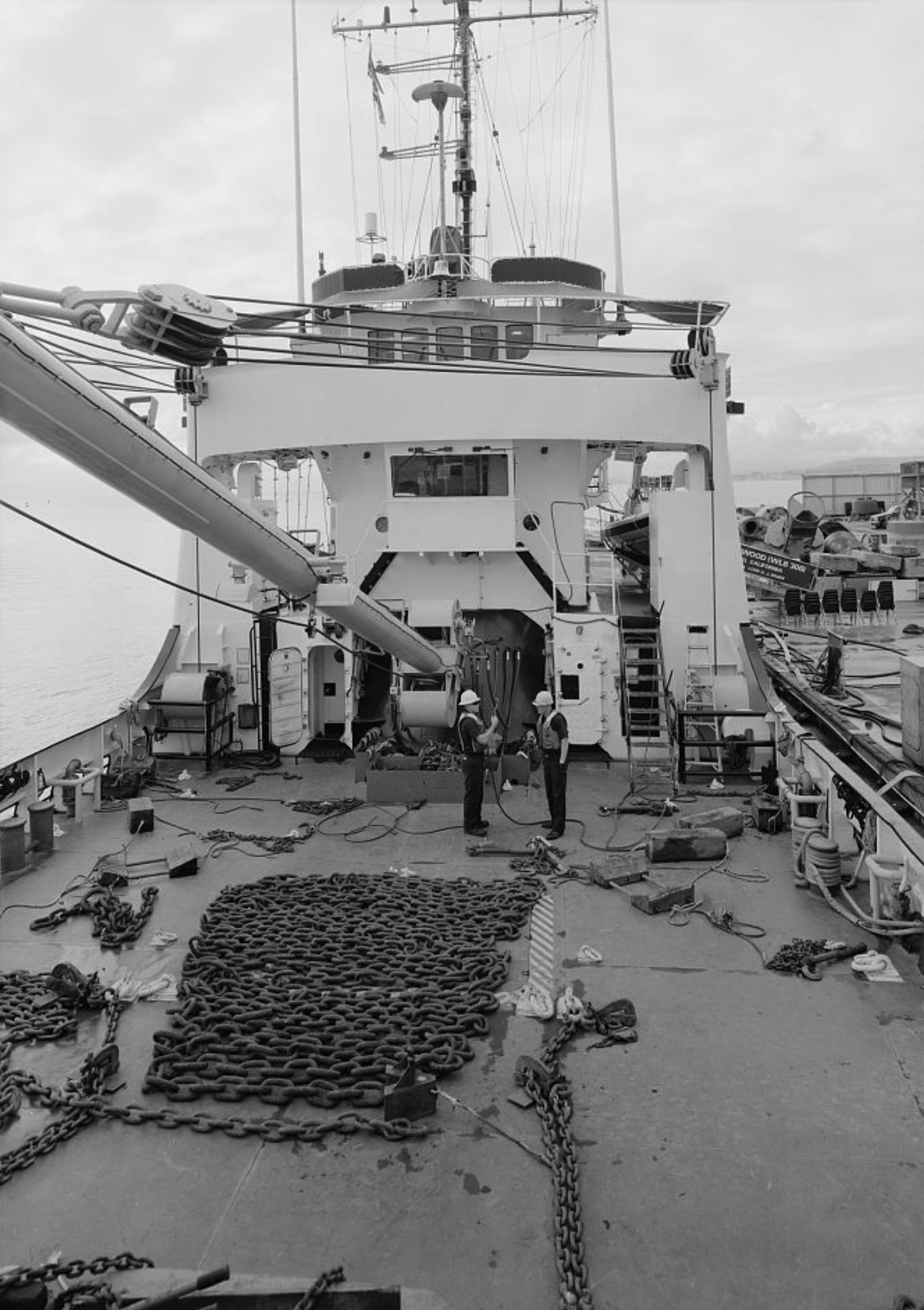
USCGC Buttonwood buoy deck

Buttonwood was built by the Marine Iron and Shipbuilding Company of Duluth, Minnesota. Her original cost was $880,018. Her keel was laid down on October 5, 1942, and she was launched on May 20, 1943. She was christened by Duluth's war loan campaign queen Mary Elizabeth Peterson. She was commissioned in Duluth on September 24, 1943.

Her hull was constructed of welded steel plates, framed with steel I-beams. As originally built, Buttonwood was 180 feet (55 m) long, with a beam of 37 feet (11 m), and a draft of 12 feet (3.7 m). Her displacement was 935 tons. While her overall dimensions remained the same over her career, the addition of new equipment raised her displacement to 1,025 tons by the end of her Coast Guard service.

Buttonwood had a single propeller driven by a diesel-electric propulsion system. Two Cooper-Bessemer GN-8 4-cycle 8-cylinder Diesel engines produced 700 horsepower each. They provided power to two Westinghouse generators. The electricity from the generators ran an electric motor which turned the propeller.

She had a single cargo boom which could lift 20 tons onto her buoy deck.

The ship's fuel tanks had a capacity of approximately 28,875 US gallons (109,300 L). Buttonwood's unrefueled range was 8,000 nautical miles (15,000 km) at 13 knots, 12,000 nautical miles (22,000 km) at 12 knots, and 17,000 nautical miles (31,000 km) at 8.3 knots. Her potable water tanks had a capacity of 30,499 US gallons (115,450 L). Considering dry storage capacity and other factors, her at-sea endurance was 21 days.

Her wartime complement was 6 officers and 74 enlisted men. By 1964 this was reduced to 5 officers, 2 warrant officers, and 47 enlisted personnel.

Buttonwood was armed with a 3"/50 caliber gun mounted behind the pilot house. She also had two 20mm guns, one mounted on top of the wheelhouse and one on the aft deck. Two racks of depth charges were also mounted on the aft deck. All of her on-deck armament was removed by 1966, leaving only small arms for law enforcement actions.

At the time of construction, Buttonwood was designated WAGL, an auxiliary vessel, lighthouse tender. The designation was system was changed in 1965, and Buttonwood was redesignated WLB, an oceangoing buoy tender. Her namesake was the American sycamore, Platanus occidentalis, often referred to as buttonwood because its fine-grained wood was used to make buttons that resisted cracking.

== World War II service ==
After her launch and commissioning in Duluth, Buttonwood sailed down the Great Lakes and the Saint Lawrence River to reach the Atlantic. She arrived at the Coast Guard Yard in Curtis Bay, Maryland, on November 1, 1943, where she had her armament and sensors installed. From here she sailed through the Panama Canal to join the Third Fleet. She arrived at Guadalcanal on May 1, 1944, via the Galapagos Islands, Bora Bora, and Espiritu Santo. She was assigned to Naval Base Tulagi. Her primary mission was to establish and maintain aids to navigation.

On June 1, 1944 Buttonwood was sent south to Australia where she built and repaired a number of light structures. She departed in mid-September for Milne Bay, Papua New Guinea where she worked on aids to navigation until mid-October. Buttonwood reached San Pedro Bay in Leyte Gulf in the Philippines during an air raid on November 4, 1944. This was two weeks after US ground forces had landed in the Philippines and the area was still contested. Buttonwood endured 269 attacks by Japanese aircraft, including 11 air raids in one day. On November 24, 1944 she shot down a twin-engine bomber with her 3" gun. On November 26 she shot down another plane. When not engaged by air raids, Buttonwood charted the surrounding waters and placed buoys to guide Allied ships.

On Christmas Day 1944 Buttonwood sailed for the nearby Guiuan Bay. She arrived in time to see the Dutch vessel MV Sommeisdijk torpedoed by a Japanese aircraft. The ship burned furiously as its cargo of lumber caught fire. Buttonwood assisted in firefighting and rescued 182 men from the burning ship. In between air raids, she continued her surveying and buoy tending activities in Guiuan Bay, Lauaan Bay, and San Pedro Bay. She sailed to Australia for repairs at the end of March 1945, but was back in the Philippines on June 12, 1945. She continued with her work maintaining aids to navigation in the Leyte Gulf area until August 22, 1945.

== Post-war service ==
Honolulu, Hawaii, was Buttonwood's homeport after the war. She maintained aids to navigation in Hawaiian waters but also ranged widely in the central and western Pacific on similar duties. In 1953, for instance, Buttonwood took a two-month cruise to maintain buoys in Samoa, and Kanton, Jarvis, Enderbury, Baker, and Howland Islands. The ship also brought supplies to remote LORAN stations throughout the Pacific, such as the one at French Frigate Shoals.

Buttonwood was also responsible for search and rescue activities. She towed a number of disabled vessels back to port including Sea Dragon in June 1951 and Yellow Fin in 1952. Most of her tows were broken down fishing boats, but in 1971 she brought the yacht Graybeard safely to port after she lost her rudder during that year's Transpac Race. In September 1956 Buttonwood rescued 16 crewmen of a Navy Lockheed Super Constellation that had ditched about 100 miles short of Guam. In 1970 she rescued the 18-man crew of a Japanese ship that had gone aground on Laysan Island.

Buttonwood was called on to support other Coast Guard missions. She enforced fishing regulations several times in Hawaiian water with both Japanese and Russian violators. In February 1981 Buttonwood sailed from Hawaii for the last time. She was transferred to Galveston, Texas, where she replaced the USCGC Blackthorn, which was sunk in a collision with an oil tanker the previous year.

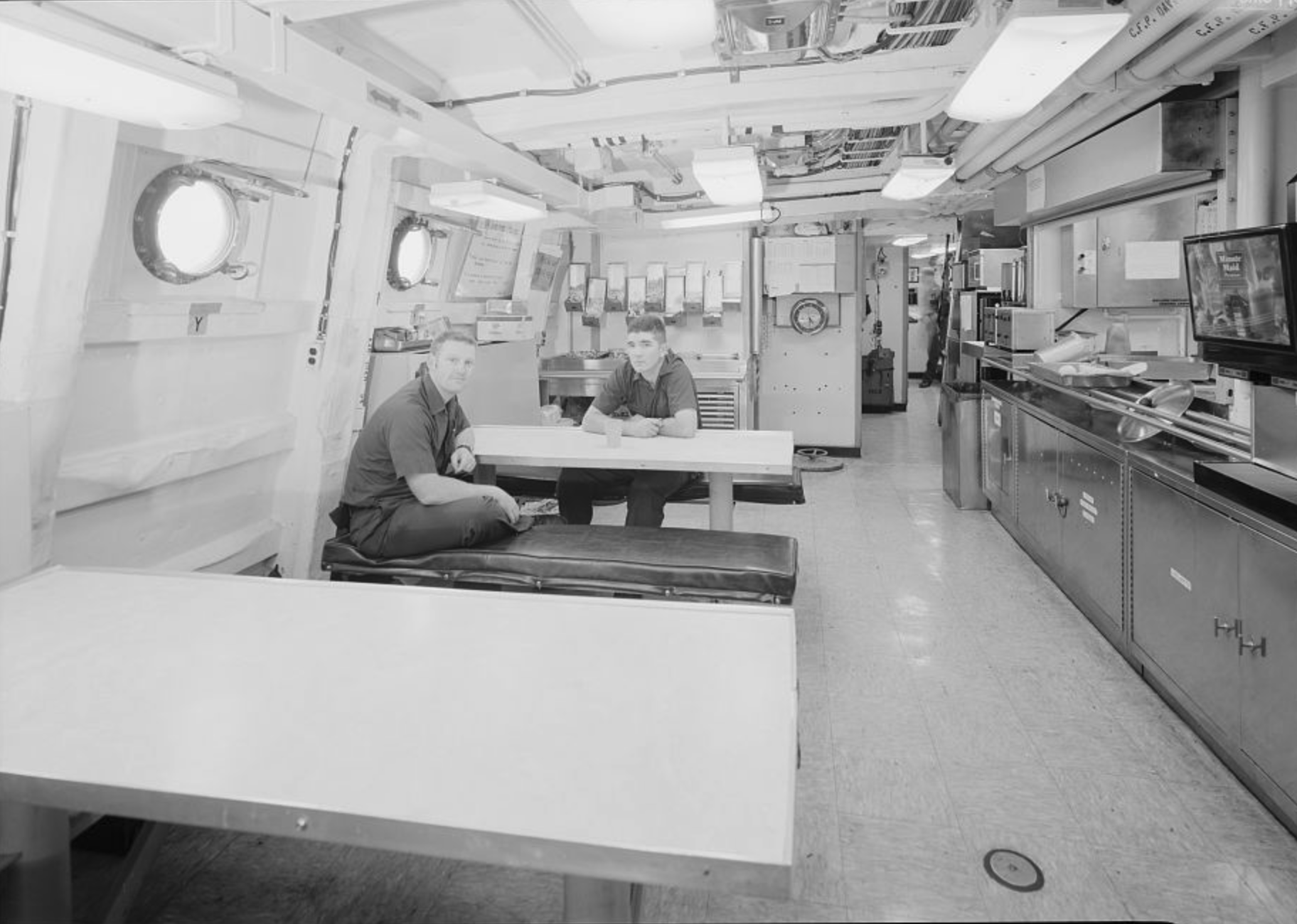
USCGC Buttonwood crew mess after SLEP upgrade

Buttonwood arrived in Galveston on April 9, 1981. Her primary mission was servicing more than 135 aids to navigation in Texas and Louisiana waters. This duty was particularly difficult in the wake of Hurricanes Alicia and Danny which did significant damage. The ship also cooperated with NOAA to maintain weather buoys in the Gulf of Mexico. She was part of the Coast Guard response to the oil spill from the Norwegian tanker Mega Borg in 1990. On April 15, 1991 Buttonwood sailed from Galveston for the Coast Guard Yard for a major overhaul as part of the Service Life Extension Program (SLEP). She was replaced in Galveston by USCGC Papaw .

The SLEP refit was extensive. The hull was sand-blasted, inspected, and repaired where corrosion warranted. A bow thruster was added to improve maneuverability. Living quarters were modernized. Additional space was provided for female sailors. New navigational electronics were installed. Buttonwood's refit was not completed until early 1993. The total cost of her renovation was budgeted at $13,023,000.

In January 1993 USCGC Blackhaw sailed from her homeport of San Francisco to the Coast Guard Yard in Maryland where she was decommissioned. Her crew was detailed to Buttonwood. They sailed back to San Francisco, which became the ship's new home port. Her primary responsibility was maintaining aids to navigation, but she was also active in search and rescue, and oil spill response. Buttonwood's most newsworthy deployment during this posting was recovery or debris associated with the crash of a US Air Force HC-130 off the California coast in November 1996. She hauled wreckage onto her buoy deck for later analysis on shore.

Buttonwood was decommissioned in San Francisco on June 28, 2001. She received a number of awards during her government service including the Coast Guard Unit Commendation, Meritorious Unit Commendation, World War II Victory Medal, Navy Occupation Service Medal, and at least four battle efficiency awards.

== Dominican Republic service ==
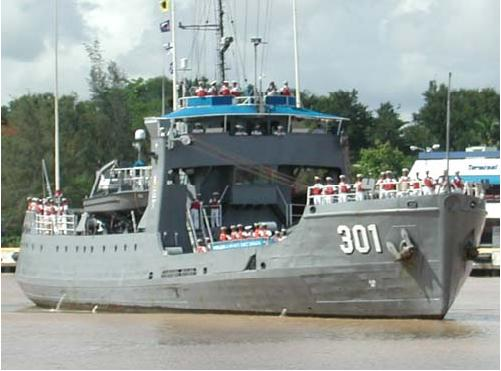
Alimirante Didiez Burgos (ex USCGC Buttonwood) in 2008

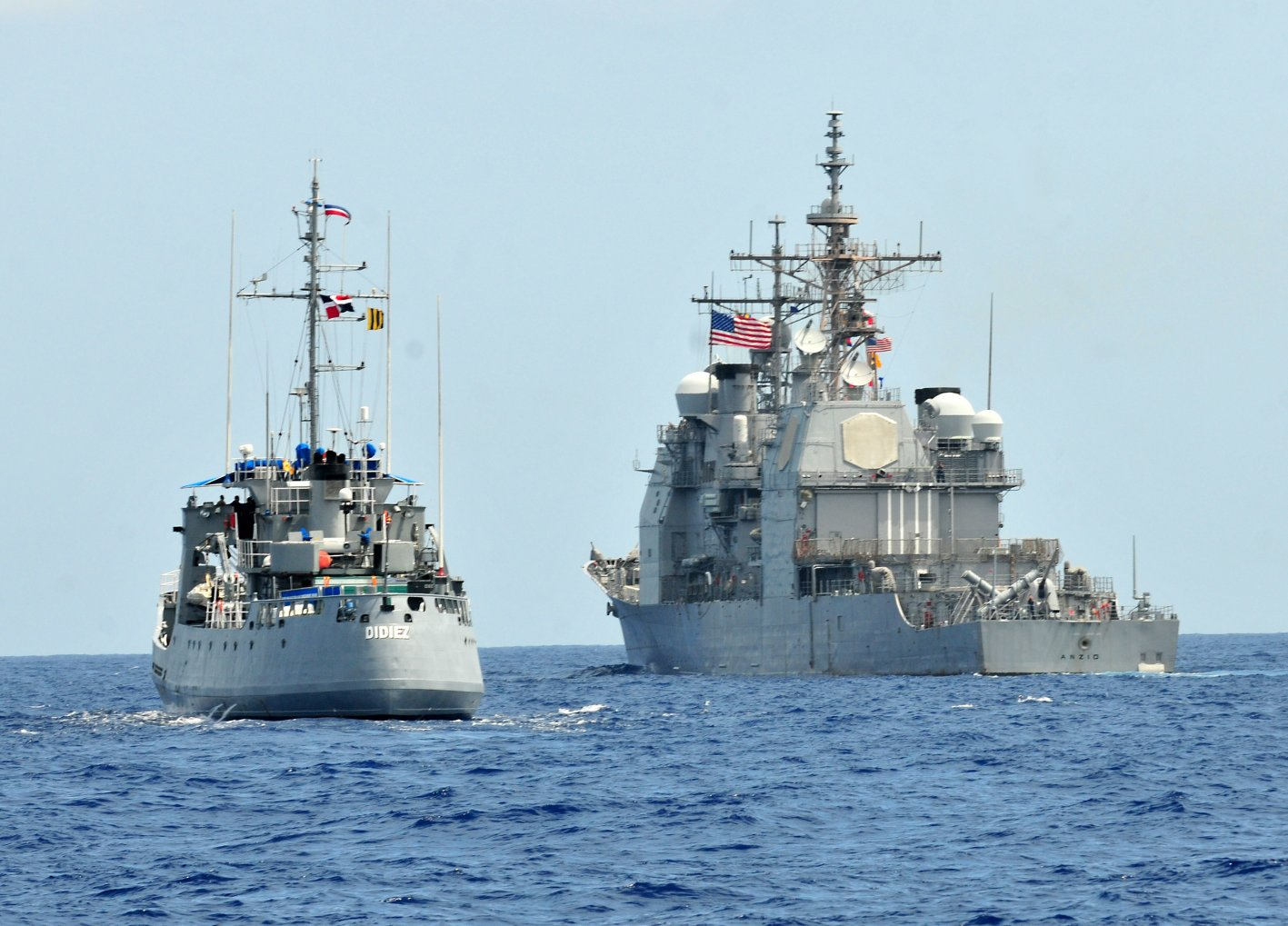
Almirante Didiez Burgos and USS Anzio during UNITAS Atlantic 2012 exercise

Buttonwood was transferred to the Dominican Republic Navy on June 30, 2001 at a ceremony in San Francisco. She was renamed Almirante Didiez Burgos. She is the flagship of the Dominican Republic Navy. The ship is used for transport and supply missions, coastal patrol and as a training vessel. She is stationed at the 27th of February Navy Base in Santo Domingo.

Her complement is 12 officers and 45 enlisted men. She has been rearmed for her new role as a patrol vessel with two M-2 0.50 caliber machine guns and two single Oerlikon 20 mm cannon. The ship's namesake is Rear Admiral Ramón Julio Didiez Burgos who was head of the Dominican Republic Navy at various times between 1947 and 1955.

In 2010 Almirante Didiez Burgos took part in a joint United States Coast Guard-Dominican Republic training exercise in Dominican territorial waters. She sailed in the UNITAS Atlantic 2012 exercise with US and other navies. Almirante Didiez Burgos sailed to Baltimore to participate In Fleet Week celebrations in 2012. The ship delivered emergency supplies to the Bahamas in the wake of Hurricane Dorian in 2019.
