= MV White Holly =

Ship built in 1944

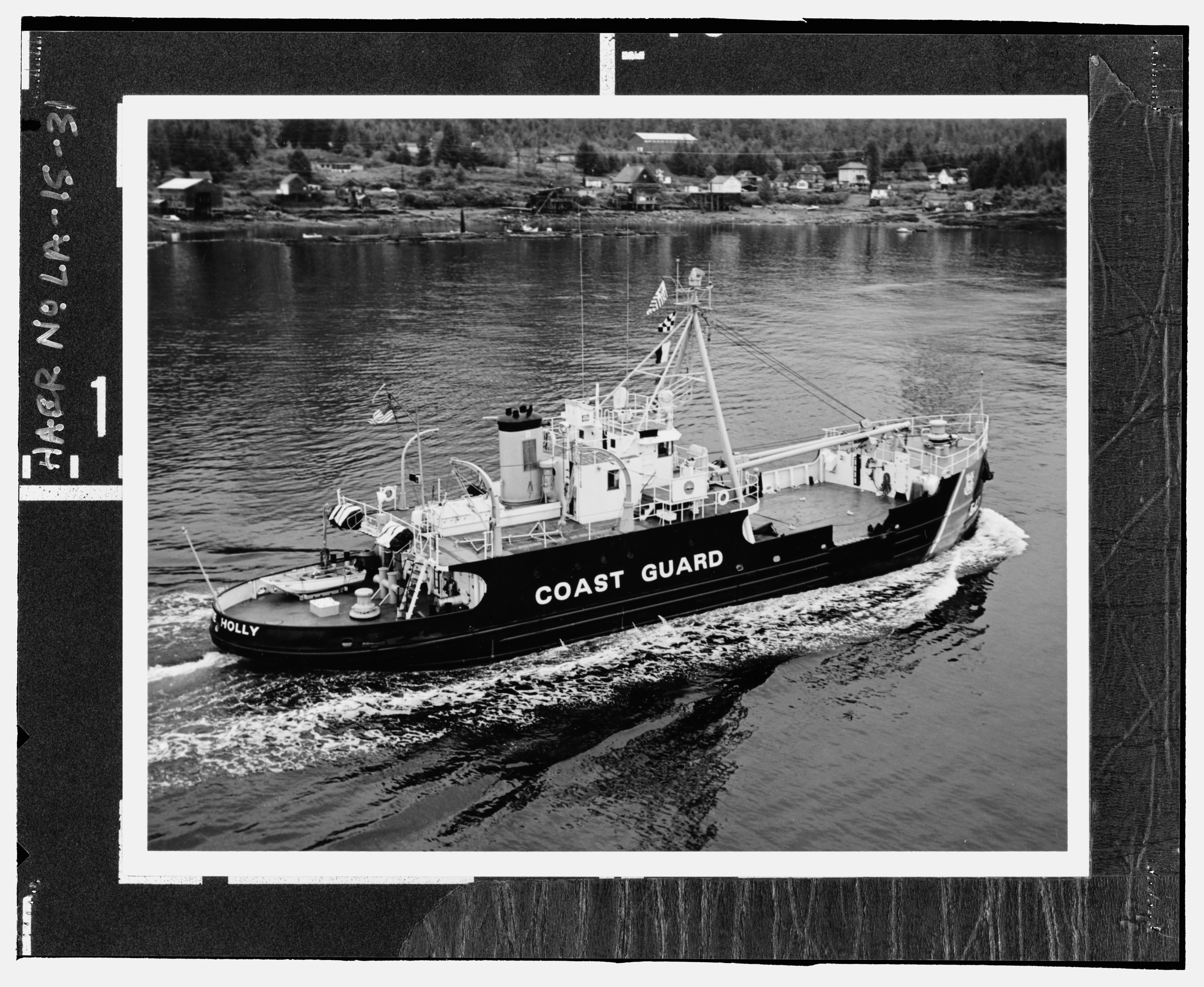

History

United States
- Name: YF-341
- Operator: US Navy
- Builder: Basalt Ship Building
- Laid down: 3 August 1943
- Launched: 8 April 1944
- Fate: Transferred to the US Coast Guard in 1946

History

United States
- Name: White Holly
- Operator: US Coast Guard
- Reclassified: WLM-543, 1960s
- Identification: Hull number: WAGL-543
- Fate: Retired in 1998

History

United States
- Name: MV White Holly
- Owner: Sea Shepherd Conservation Society
- Operator: Sea Shepherd Conservation Society
- Port of registry: US
- Acquired: September 2018
- In service: December 2021
- Identification: Call sign: WDC4970; IMO number: 8963222; MMSI number: 366896000
- Fate: Scrapped in Mexico by Ocean Express Recycling

General characteristics
- Tonnage: 421 t
- Length: 40.5 m (133 ft)
- Beam: 9.14 m (30.0 ft)
- Draught: 3 m (9.8 ft)

The MV White Holly was a 421-ton vessel owned and operated by the Sea Shepherd Conservation Society since September 2018.

The vessel was retrofitted in Fernandina Beach, Florida, to be used in direct action Sea Shepherd Conservation Society operations against illegal fisheries activities. Its first operation is at the Guadalupe Island on the southern Sea of Cortez, Mexico. Its first operation is called Operation Divina Guadalupe VI and study the Cuvier's beaked whale.

== History ==
The ship was built in 1944 for the US Navy and served in World War II in Pearl Harbor delivering ammunition to naval vessels. She was acquired by the US Coast Guard in 1946 serving on the Alaskan coastline until the 1970s. The vessel was later relocated to Louisiana as a buoy tender until her retirement from the Coast Guard in 1998. The vessel was purchased by Benoit Vulliet for oceanographic research, and years later, he donated it to Sea Shepherd Conservation Society.

In late 2021 because of age Sea Shepherd had the vessel decommissioned and scrapped in Mexico. Sea Shepherd plans to acquire a new vessel in 2022 to replace it on its Central America patrols.

== See also ==
- Neptune's Navy, Sea Shepherd vessels
- Sea Shepherd Conservation Society operations
