= Daboll =

Daboll is a surname. Notable people with the surname include:

- Brian Daboll (born 1975), Canadian-born American football coach
- Celadon Leeds Daboll (1818–1866), American merchant and inventor
- Nathan Daboll (1750–1818), American educator
- Nathan Daboll (politician) (1780–1863), American politician, judge, and author

== See also ==
- Daboll trumpet
