= List of Maine painters =

This is a list of painters who reside(d) in the state of Maine, United States, on a full-time or seasonal basis, or whose work is otherwise noted for its association with the Maine landscape.

- Bo Bartlett (born 1955)
- George Wesley Bellows (1882–1925)
- Frank Weston Benson (1862–1951)
- Carroll Thayer Berry (1886–1978)
- Harrison Bird Brown (1831–1915)
- Frederic E. Church (1826–1900)
- Charles Codman (1800–1842)
- Thomas Cole (1801–1848)
- Jay Hall Connaway (1893–1970)
- Mountfort Coolidge (1888–1954)
- Thomas Cornell (1937–2012)
- Earl Cunningham (1893–1977)
- Thomas Doughty (1793–1856)
- Rackstraw Downes (born 1939)
- Stephen Etnier (1903–1984)
- John Fulton Folinsbee (1892–1872)
- Harold Garde (1923–2022)
- Channing Hare (1899–1976)
- Marsden Hartley (1877–1943)
- Robert Henri (1865–1929)
- Winslow Homer (1836–1910)
- Edward Hopper (1882–1967)
- Jon Imber (1950–2014)
- Dahlov Ipcar (1917–2017)
- Alex Katz (born 1927)
- Rockwell Kent (1882–1971)
- Charles F. Kimball (1831–1903)
- Frances Kornbluth (1920–2014)
- Leon Kroll (1884–1974)
- Yasuo Kuniyoshi (1893–1953)
- Fitz Henry Lane (1804–1865)
- John Marin (1870–1953)
- Daniel Merriam (born 1963)
- Louise Nevelson (1900–1988)
- George Lorenzo Noyes (1863–1945)
- Waldo Peirce (1884–1970)
- Fairfield Porter (1907–1975)
- Maurice Prendergast (1861–1924)
- Edward Willis Redfield (1869–1965)
- Walter Elmer Schofield (1867–1944)
- Reuben Tam (1916–1991)
- William Thon (1906–2000)
- John Walker (born 1939)
- Charles Wadsworth (1917–2002)
- Neil Welliver (1929–2005)
- Charles H. Woodbury (1864–1940)
- Andrew Wyeth (1917–2009)
- Jamie Wyeth (born 1946)
- N.C. Wyeth (1882–1945)
- William Zorach (1887–1966)
