= Alice Kent Stoddard =

American painter (1883–1976)

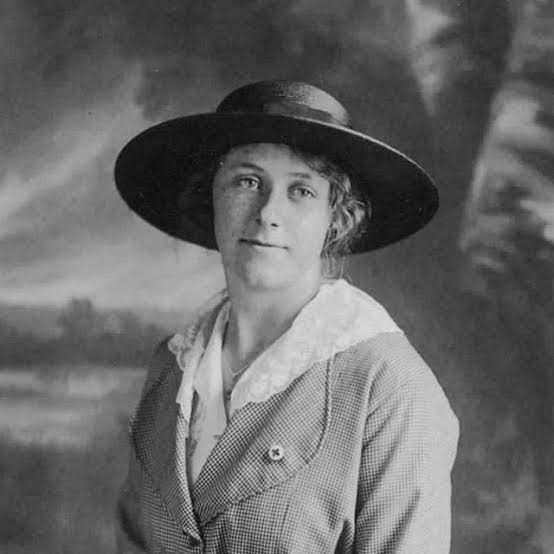
- Stoddard c. 1910
- Born: 1883; Watertown, Connecticut
- Died: 1976 (aged 92–93)
- Spouse: Joseph Thurman Pearson Jr.
- Awards: Mary Smith Prize, Pennsylvania Academy of the Fine Arts 1911; Mary Smith Prize, Pennsylvania Academy of the Fine Arts 1913; Small Oils Painting, Philadelphia Sketch Club

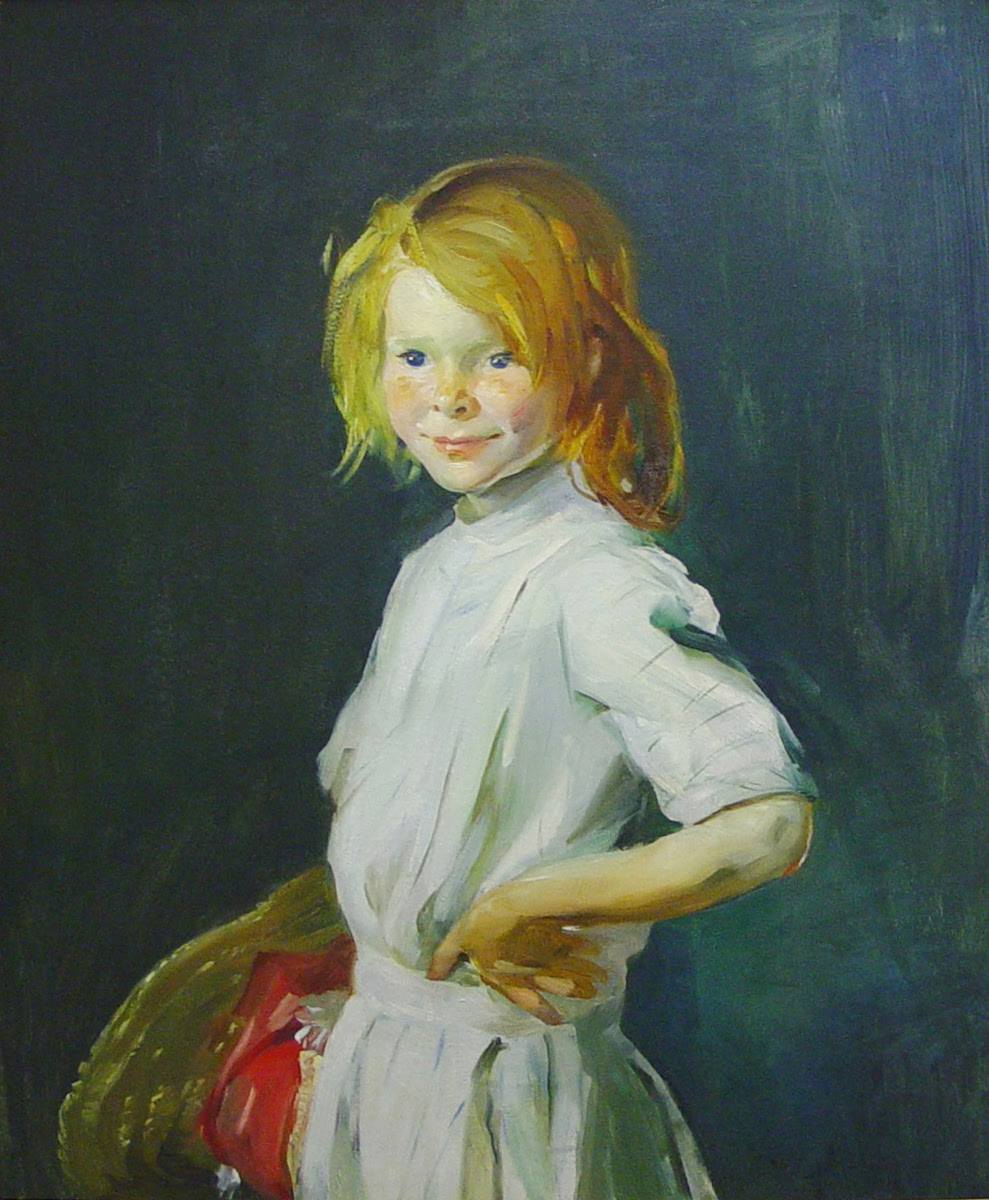
Alice Kent Stoddard, (American, 1883-1976), Leila, 1915, oil on canvas, 30 x 25 in., Reading Public Museum, Reading, Pennsylvania, Gift, George D. Horst

Alice Kent Stoddard (1883–1976) was an American painter of portraits, landscapes, and seascapes. Many of her works, particularly portraits, are in public collections, including University of Pennsylvania's portrait collection, Woodmere Art Museum, and other museums. She lived and painted on Monhegan Island in Maine, an enclave of artists. During World War II, she worked as a combat artist and drafted designs for airplanes. She married late in life to Joseph Pearson, who had been a friend and taught at the Pennsylvania Academy of the Fine Arts.

== Personal life ==
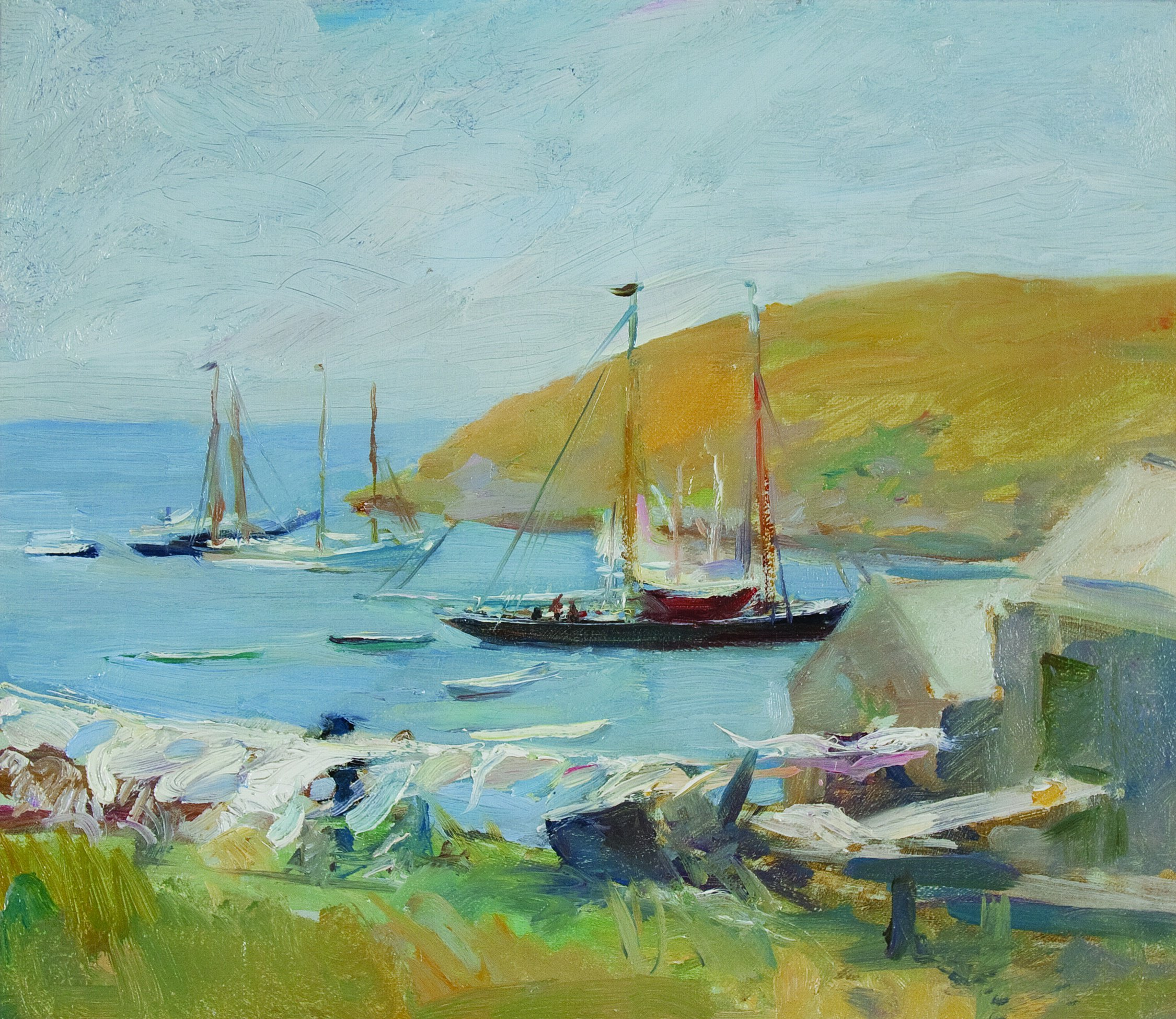
Monhegan Island Harbor Looking Toward Manana, 1910, The Monhegan Museum, Maine

Alice Kent Stoddard was born in Watertown, Connecticut in 1883. Her first cousin was artist Rockwell Kent. She rented and then bought her cousin's house known as Rockwell Kent Cottage and Studio in Monhegan, Maine.

She was good friends with fellow artist Joseph Thurman Pearson Jr., who taught at the Pennsylvania Academy of the Fine Arts. Pearson's wife, Emily, died in 1947, and Stoddard married him in 1948. They lived at "Pearson's Corner," along the Pennypack Creek, in Huntingdon Valley, Pennsylvania. Pearson died in 1951.

== Education ==
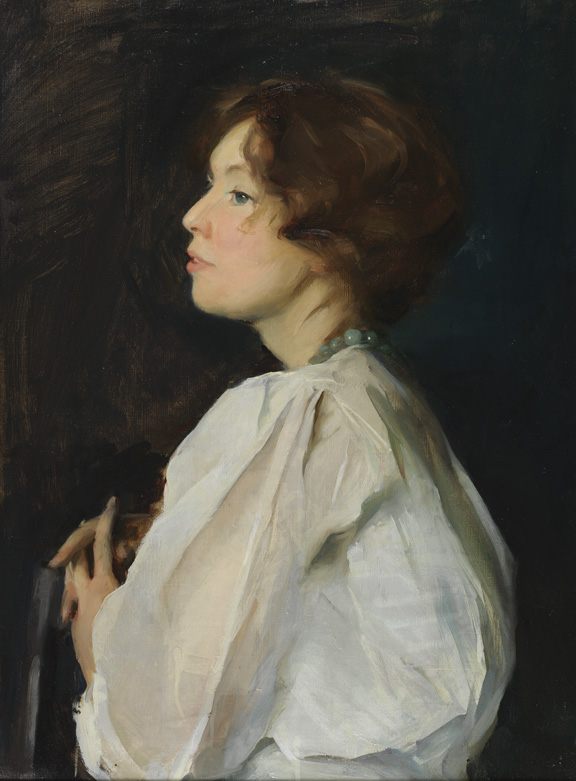
Elizabeth Sparhawk-Jones, 1910, Pennsylvania Academy of the Fine Arts

Stoddard studied at the Philadelphia School of Design for Women, after which she studied under William Merritt Chase, Thomas Anshutz and Cecilia Beaux at the Pennsylvania Academy of the Fine Arts (PAFA). She won the Cresson Traveling Scholarship from PAFA.

== Career ==
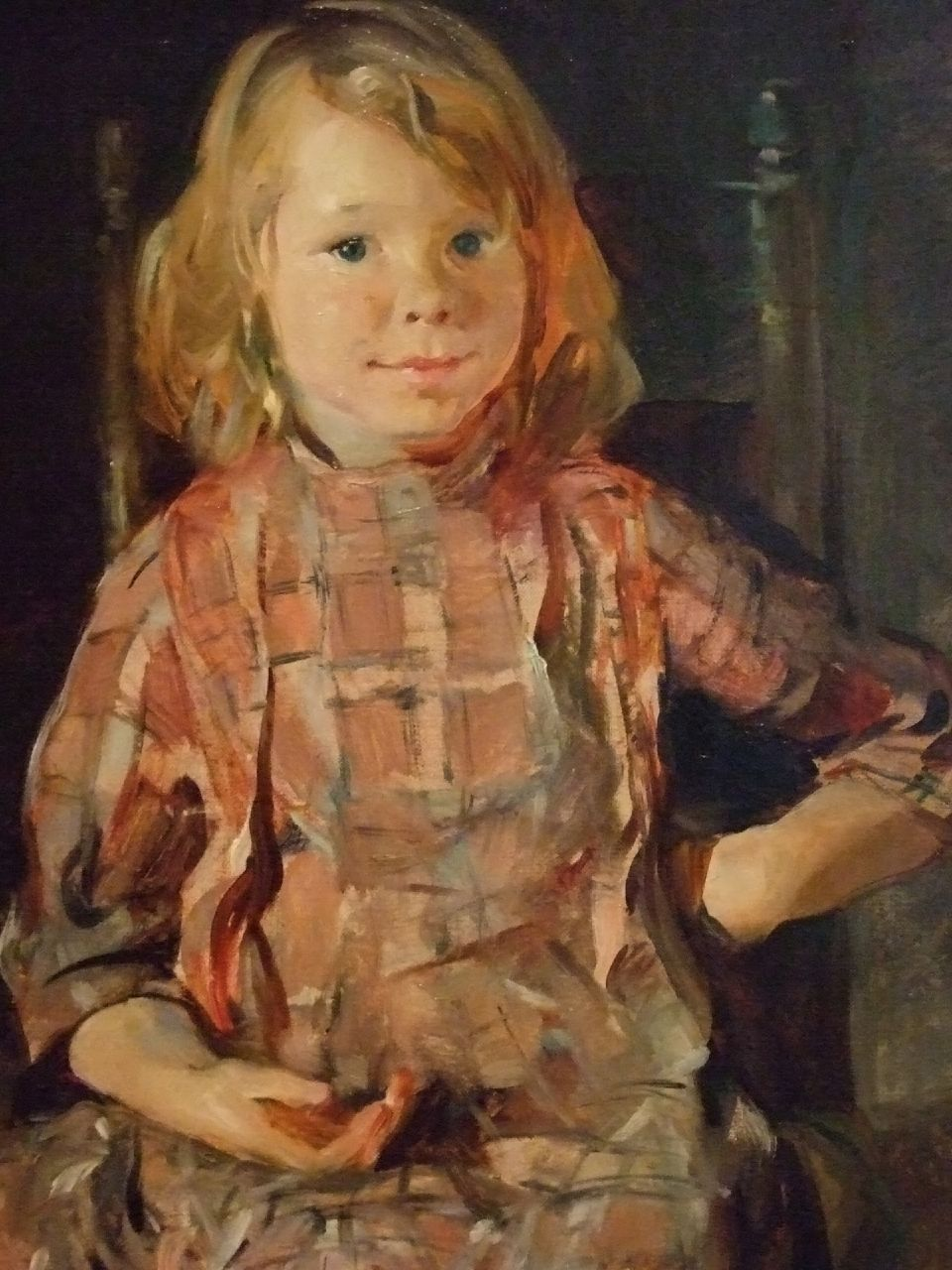
Fisherman's Little Sister, 1915, Dallas Museum of Art

In 1911 and 1913, she was awarded the Mary Smith Prize from the Pennsylvania Academy of the Fine Arts for Paper Dolls.

She was a member of The Plastic Club. In 1938, she became an associate of the National Academy of Design.

Stoddard painted portraits of Philadelphia socialites, often including pets in the paintings. She painted her mother and sister in Mother and Virginia in Sitting Room about 1934. Woodmere Art Museum states, "Here she masterfully conveys the intimacy of family life... Virginia pauses while knitting, seemingly lost in thought. Across the room, Stoddard's mother focuses on a game of solitaire. The large, rectangular space between the two women emphasizes the psychological distance between them in their respective moments of quiet contemplation.

Stoddard visited and lived in Monhegan, Maine, and integrated the people and scenery in her paintings." She painted Manville Davis, a fisherman in Mending the Nets and a portrait of artist Andrew Winter. The area became an enclave for artists, some of the other artists who painted and visited there were Robert Henri, the Wyeth family (N. C., Andrew, and Jamie), and Charles Ebert.

During World War II she worked as a mechanical draftsperson for airplane design for Budd Company and as a combat artist. Her work was exhibited at Woodmere Art Museum, where she also volunteered her time.

Stoddard painted a mural in one of the courtrooms of the Family Court Building in Philadelphia. The mural featured a couple planting a tree and a family scene, within a construction area. It was one of 37 murals made in the building to depict the societal usefulness of the jurisprudence system. She won a "Small Oils Painting" medal at a Philadelphia Sketch Club.

== Collections ==
- Alderney Library, Channel Islands
  - Beatrice Fox Griffith of Haverford, West Pennsylvania, 1949
- Dallas Museum of Art
  - Fisherman's Little Sister, 1915
- Ewell Sale Stewart Library, Academy of National Sciences, Philadelphia
  - Charles M. B. Cadwalader
- Farnsworth Art Museum, Rockland, Maine
  - Artist Sketching, 1953
  - Portrait of Andrew Winter, 1953
- Franklin Institute Of Science, Philadelphia
  - Benjamin Franklin
- The Monhegan Museum
  - Mending Nets
  - Monhegan Island Harbor Looking Toward Manana, 1910
  - Portrait of Gerald Stanley, 1913
- National Academy of Design
  - Self-Portrait, c. 1938
  - Clarence Clark Zantzinger, c. 1945
- Oregon Historical Society, Portland
  - Uncle John Stoughton
- Pennsylvania Academy of the Fine Arts
  - Polly (Mrs. H. Lea Hudson)
  - Elizabeth Sparhawk-Jones, before 1911
- Reading Public Museum and Art Gallery, Pennsylvania
  - Leila
- Union League of Philadelphia
  - Melville Griffith Baker (1875-1930), c. 1930
- University of Pennsylvania
  - Francis Bernard Bracken (1869-1937), c. 1925-1935
  - Eldridge L. Eliason
  - Emma Barton Gates
  - Thomas Sovereign Gates, 1958
  - John Claxton Gittings
  - Samuel Frederick Houston
  - Edwin R. Keedy
  - Clarence Erwin McClung (1870-)
  - Clarence Ewing McClung (1870-1946)
  - William L. Mclean, c. 1944-1954
  - William Ephraim Mikell
  - Roy Franklin Nichols, 1966
  - Charles Root Turner, 1939
- Woodmere Art Museum, Philadelphia
  - Boy with Hawk
  - David Gates with Dog
  - Mary Stuard Townsend Mason
  - Master Pomeroy, c. 1929
  - The Puppies' Angel
  - Red-Headed Girl with a Doll
  - James A. Waller, 1931
- Williams College Museum of Art, Massachusetts
  - Harriet Walton Dunbar, 1912
