= Nathan Daboll =

American mathematician

- Born: May 5 1750 [O.S. April 24, 1750] Groton, Connecticut, United States
- Died: March 9, 1818 (aged 67); Groton, Connecticut
- Occupations: Writer, educator, navigation school operator
- Writing career
- Genres: Almanacs; Textbook (Mathematics); Textbook (Navigation)

Nathan Daboll (May 5 1750 [O.S. April 24, 1750] – March 9, 1818) was an American teacher who wrote the mathematics textbook most commonly used in American schools in the first half of the 19th century. During the course of his career, he also operated a popular navigation school for merchant mariners, and published a variety of almanacs during the American Revolution period.

== Early years ==
Born in Groton, Connecticut, Daboll was the son of Nathan Daboll (born c. 1725 in East Hampton, New York; died c. 1780) and Anna Lynn (born 1724 in Groton). He had two brothers, John (born 1755) and Benjamin (1757–1848), and two sisters Susannah (born 1748) and Amy (born 1764). Daboll's father was born with the surname Dibble, but changed it to Daboll. Daboll's grandfather was born with the surname Dibble (sometimes spelled Deble).

Daboll had little formal education but mastered mathematics quickly while earning a living as a cooper.

== Career ==
Daboll's early career was that of a teacher. He taught mathematics at the Academic School in Plainfield, Connecticut.

Because of Daboll's ability with mathematics, Samuel M. Green, an early almanac publisher in the colonies, asked Daboll to calculate almanac entries. Daboll did so, beginning in 1771, under the alias "Edmund Freebetter", before switching to publishing almanacs and registers under his own name. Almanacs were useful instruments in propaganda wars during the American Revolution. Some of Daboll's almanacs contained satirical or factual political commentary, while others didn't. For the most part, they contained common almanac material:

"lunations; eclipses of the luminaries; aspects; judgment of the weather; rising, sitting and southing of the seven stars; sun and moon's rising and sitting; festivals, and other remarkable days; courts; roads"

The textbook Daboll's schoolmaster's assistant: being a plain, practical system of arithmetic, adapted to the United States was published in 1799, and updated with Daboll's Schoolmaster's assistant, improved and enlarged being a plain practical system of arithmetic: adapted to the United States in 1814. Its popularity was based, in part, on its practicality:

"We were taught arithmetic in Daboll, then a new book, and which, being adapted to our measures of length, weight, and currency was a prodigious leap over the head of poor old Dilworth, whose rules and examples were modelled upon English customs."

Daboll was also quite notable for his maritime navigation school in New London, Connecticut where he taught navigation and nautical astronomy to as many as 1,500 seamen. In 1811, at the invitation of Commodore John Rodgers, Daboll instructed midshipmen on the frigate President. Daboll's Practical Navigator was published posthumously in 1820 by his long-time colleague Green.

Even after his death, Daboll was remembered for his mathematics. Herman Melville referred to Daboll in his 1851 novel Moby-Dick:

"I'll get the almanac and as I have heard devils can be raised with Daboll's arithmetic, I'll try my hand at raising a meaning out of these queer curvicues here with the Massachusetts calendar."

In his 1890 book The teaching and history of mathematics in the United States, mathematics historian Florian Cajori described Daboll as one of the "three great arithmeticians in America".

== Personal life ==
Daboll married his first cousin, Elizabeth Daboll (1742–1813), around 1778. They had a daughter, Lydia (born c. 1782), and a son, also named Nathan (1780–1863). A grandson, Celadon Leeds Daboll, invented the Daboll trumpet.

Daboll died in Groton in 1818.

== Works ==
=== Books ===
Cajori, F. (1890). The teaching and history of mathematics in the United States. Washington: Govt. Print. Off.

- Daboll's schoolmaster's assistant: being a plain, practical system of arithmetic, adapted to the United States, New-London, Conn.: Cady & Eells, for S. Green, 1799
- Daboll's Schoolmaster's assistant, improved and enlarged being a plain practical system of arithmetic : adapted to the United States., New-London, Conn.: Samuel Green, 1814, OCLC 15437427, Internet Archives
- Daboll's practical navigator:: being a concise, easy, and comprehensive system of navigation; calculated for the daily use of seamen, and also for an assistant to the teacher: containing plane, traverse, parallel, middle latitude, and Mercator's sailing; with all the necessary tables. : Concise rules are given, with a variety of examples in every part of common navigation; also, a new, scientific, and very short method of correcting the dead reckoning; with rules for keeping a complete reckoning at sea, applied to practice, and exemplified in three separate journals, in which may be seen all the varieties which can probably happen in a ship's reckoning., New-London, Conn.: Samuel Green, 1820, OCLC 191273862

=== Almanacs ===
- Annual Connecticut register, OCLC 198434239
- Bickerstaff's Boston almanack, OCLC 62806539
- Bickerstaff's Connecticut almanack, OCLC 62825132
- Bickerstaff's genuine almanack, OCLC 55836404
- Bickerstaff's improved : being an almanack, OCLC 55836631
- Bickerstaff's New-England almanack, OCLC 71190499
- Connecticut Almanack, OCLC 55831696
- Connecticut Register, OCLC 15455240
- Connecticut, Rhode-Island, Massachusetts, New-Hampshire & Vermont farmers almanac, OCLC 207230450
- Farmer's almanack, OCLC 55828277
- Father Abraham's New-England almanack, OCLC 55824875
- Freebetter's Connecticut Almanack, OCLC 38023321
- Freebetter's New-England Almanack, OCLC 55840855
- Green's register for the state of Connecticut with an almanack, OCLC 55813717
- New-England almanack, and gentleman's and lady's diary, OCLC 55836032
- Phillips's United States diary, or An almanack, OCLC 55810514
- Rhode-Island almanack, OCLC 207546345
- Register for the state of Connecticut: with an almanack, OCLC 62835748
- Strong's astronomical diary, calendar or, almanack, OCLC 55817806
- Thomas's Massachusetts, Connecticut, Rhode-Island, New-Hampshire and Vermont almanack, OCLC 55829175
- Town & country almanack, OCLC 55828051
- Weatherwise's Town And Country Almanack, OCLC 55826226
- Wheeler's North-American calendar, and Rhode-Island almanack, OCLC 191272979
- Wheeler's North-American calendar, or An almanack, OCLC 55817672
- Wheeler's North-American calendar, or An almanack, for the year of our Lord 1791
