= Jay Hall Connaway =

American painter (1893–1970)

- Born: November 27, 1893; Liberty, Indiana, United States
- Died: February 18, 1970; Green Valley, Arizona, United States
- Resting place: Ashes scattered in Mettowee Creek, North Rupert, Vermont
- Education: The Herron School of Art and Design
- Occupation: Realist painter

Jay Hall Connaway (1893–1970) was a realist painter and art teacher, with a muscular painterly style, renowned primarily for scenes of sea and surf around Monhegan Island, Maine. In a posthumous exhibition catalog, the Portland Museum of Art said, "a student of the sky, waves, and snow-covered hills of Maine and Vermont, Jay Connaway belonged to the generation that presented the region as timeless and quiet in the face of modernity and ensured that the image of New England maintained a prominent role in the American imagination."

== Biography ==
=== Birth and early art training ===
Connaway was born in Liberty, Indiana, November 27, 1893, the son of Cass Connaway, a lawyer and collector of Chinese art, and his wife May.

Connaway graduated from Emmerich Manual High School. Je undertook his first art training from William Forsyth, known for coastal Oregon views, at John Herron School of Art in Indianapolis in 1910 and 1911. His father bitterly opposed his becoming an artist. Connaway left home to tour the California and Oregon coasts, working his way across the country and then back to the East Coast as a stoker on engines for the Atchison, Topeka, and Santa Fe Railroad.

In New York, Connaway enrolled at the National Academy of Design school in 1912, though he did not graduate: he defaulted rather than submit the "examination" drawing, a frequent occurrence among Academy students in the earlier years of the twentieth century. From 1912 to 1914 he attended the Art Student's League at New York City, where he studied with George Bridgman and with William Merritt Chase. Another influence was Robert Henri, a New York Social Realist and leader of the Ashcan School, whom Connaway had met while attending night classes at the National Academy.

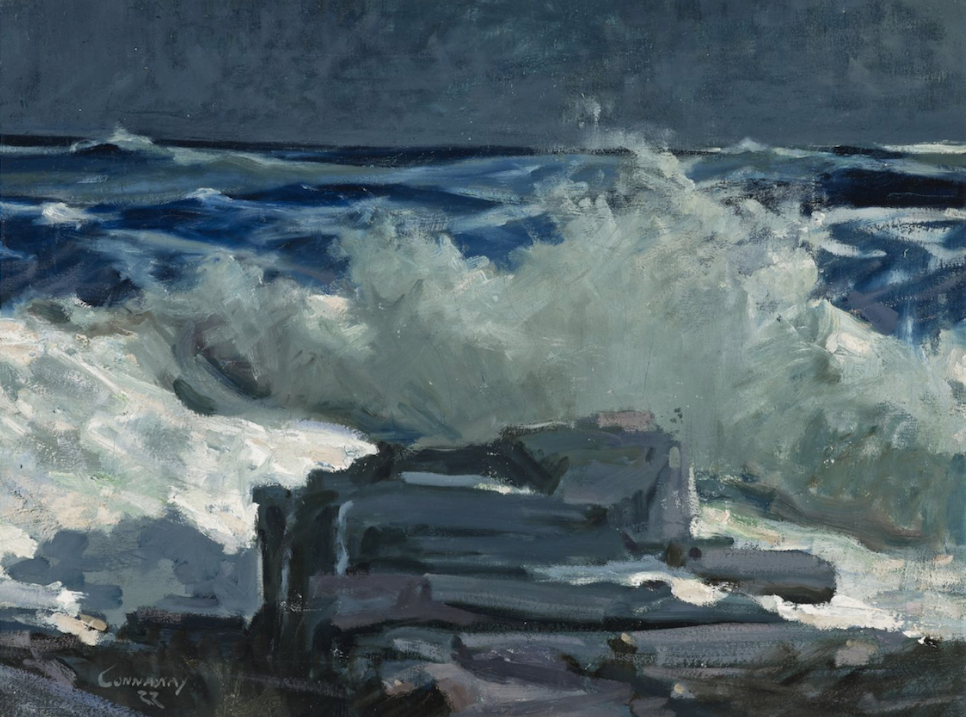
Seascape, Jay Hall Connaway, oil on canvas, 18-1/4 x 24 1/14 inches, signed and dated l.l. Connaway / 22, Indianapolis Museum of Art

During this period, Connaway first traveled to Maine to study and paint the rocky coast and ocean swells. These early years in New York and Maine were hard, according to columnist Lowell Nussbaum, writing in the Indianapolis Star after his death. "[In] New York ... he lived a hand-to-mouth existence. There he practically lived on canned tomatoes because they were so cheap. And when he was painting the sea on an island off the coast of Maine, in the summer, he lived on berries. Food wasn't the worst of his problems. With no income, he couldn't buy canvases. When he was lucky enough to have a shirt to wear, he sometimes would stretch it and paint on it. To conceal his lack of a shirt when he was outside his room, he turned his coat collar up."

In New York, Connaway briefly took a studio in the Tenth Street Studio Building near his teacher William Merrit Chase, but the advent of World War I suddenly removed him from the New York art world—and yet gave him the opportunities which launched his career.

=== Career as an artist ===
In 1917 the 24-year-old enlisted and shipped out to Contrexeville, France. After suffering a shoulder wound, he worked as a cartographer. Then he was assigned to what he called "the most wonderful work of my life"—making detailed watercolor drawings of lesions caused by mustard gas. This brought him to the attention of Lafayette Page, a physician who was so impressed with Connaway's draftsmanship that, at the close of the war, he sponsored his studies at the Académie Julian (1919–20) under Jean Paul Laurens and at the École des Beaux-Arts (1921) in Paris.

On the return trip to America, fortuitously Connaway made a shipboard contact with Frederick Keppel, the owner of an international art and print firm who introduced Connaway to Robert Macbeth of Macbeth Gallery, New York. Connaway's first of many one-man shows was held at Macbeth Gallery in 1923.

With backing from Macbeth and art collector Bartlett Arkell, supplemented by cash from artists Paul Dougherty and Emil Carlsen, and advice from painter Frederick Judd Waugh, Connaway, "seeking to paint the lonely sea", found his way to uninhabited Head Harbor Island, off the coast of Jonesport, Maine, where he lived as an artistic hermit. He later worked dories with a Grand Banks fishing fleet, was a cook for a lumber camp in Maine, and he enlisted in the Coast Guard.

In 1927, Connaway met and in 1928 married Louise Boehle, a classically trained pianist and nurse. With financial backing again from Macbeth and Arkell, the couple embarked on a three-year trip to France, where Connaway painted the rugged coast of Brittany. There at Pont-Aven, their only daughter, Leonebel Marie Frances, was born in 1929.

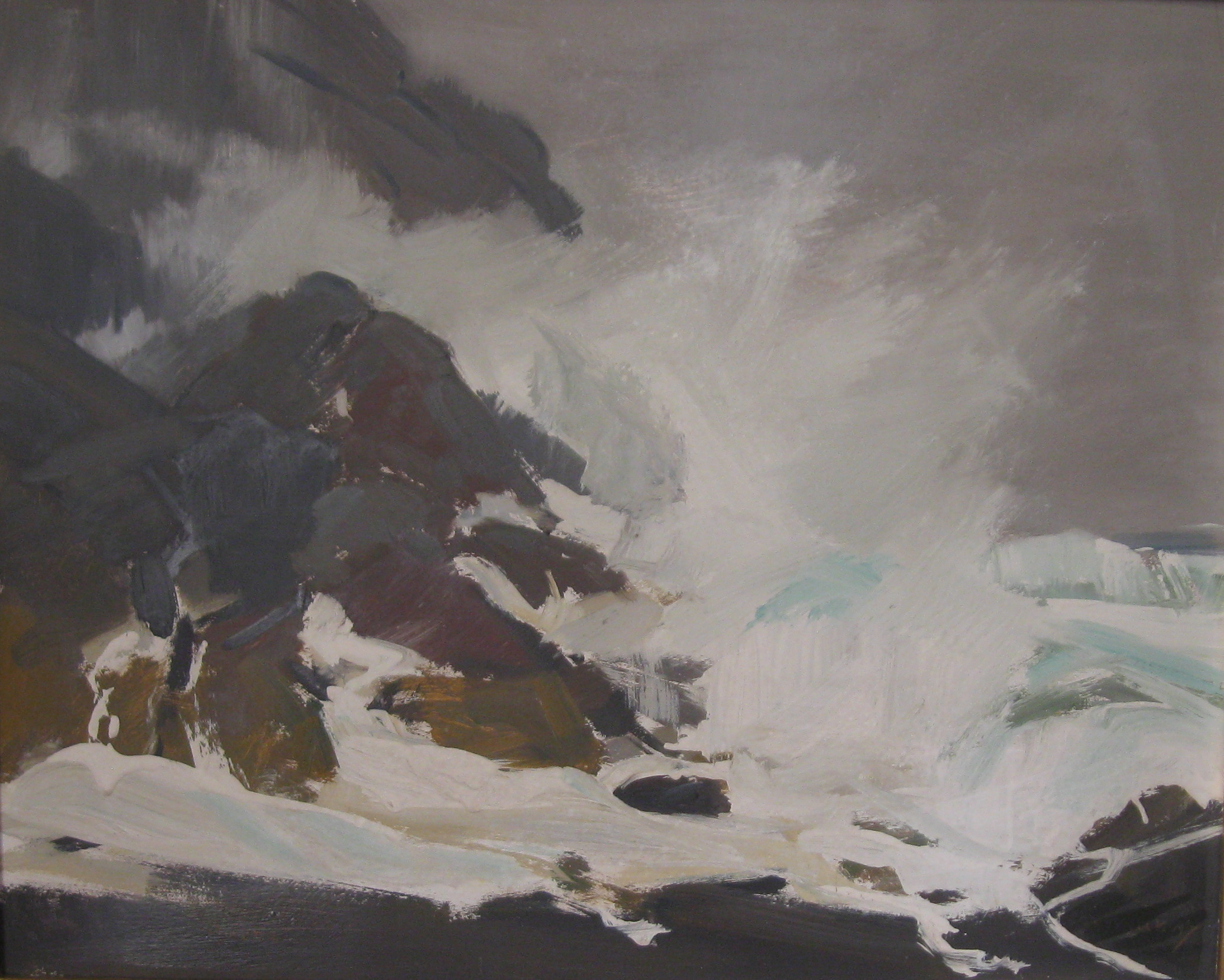
Monhegan Rocks by Jay Hall Connaway, tempura on paper, 1952, 20" by 16" (50.8cm by 40.64cm), private collection

Upon their return to the United States in 1931 in the midst of the Great Depression, Bartlett Arkell and Robert Macbeth again sponsored the artist, this time providing first a studio in Portland, Maine, and then a cottage on the remote art colony island of Monhegan. Connaway was one of the three principal painters on Monhegan during the 1930s and 1940s, the others being Abraham Bogdanove and Andrew Winter (who came to Monhegan at Connaway's suggestion). There Connaway started the Connaway Art School.

At the outbreak of World War II, the Connaways left Monhegan temporarily and took work to help the war effort at American Car and Foundry Company in Berwick, Pennsylvania. At first Connaway worked the assembly line but was reassigned to draw the tank parts for the catalogue. He returned to Monhegan in the summers to tend to school business and art sales.

In 194,3 Connaway was elected a member of the National Academy of Design; he was also a member of the Salmagundi Club.

The Connaways remained on Monhegan until 1947, when they moved to Vermont, residing in Dorset until 1953, then North Rupert. Connaway painted rural landscapes of the Vermont countryside and operated a summer art school until 1966. He also lectured and demonstrated his painting techniques in art schools and museums across America.

During the 1950s, Connaway found himself at odds with newly ascendant modernism, particularly abstract art. He wrote in his journal: "[t]his game called art, what is it? Am not sure I know. It seems that Realism, a style of saying nothing very well; and Modernism, a style of saying absolutely nothing very, very badly. There must be a middle."

In 1962, Connaway merged his school with the Southern Vermont Arts Center and became the school's first director. During the 1960s, in addition to managing the art school, he painted in Portugal, Spain, California, and Arizona. In the last year of his life, troubled with poor eyesight and failing health, he was no longer able to paint.

=== Death ===
Connaway had taken to spending winters in Green Valley, Arizona in his later years, and he died there on February 18, 1970. Survivors included his widow Louise B. Connaway, his daughter, Leonebel M. Connaway in New York City, a brother, Hugh W. Connaway of Indianapolis, Indiana, a retired photographer for the Indianapolis Star; an Aunt Mrs. Leah Connaway of Liberty, Indiana; and first cousins Charles C. Widdows and Glenn Connaway, both also of Liberty.

Connaway's widow and daughter donated Conway's papers to the Smithsonian Archives of American Art, where they remain on deposit available to researchers.

There is no final resting place: his body was donated at his request to the University of Vermont Medical School, and the cremated remains were scattered in Mettowee Creek behind his studio in North Rupert, Vermont.

== Gallery and museum collections ==
Nearly ninety one-man shows of his works were held during his career, including annual exhibitions at the MacBeth Gallery in New York City. His work was also exhibited at other leading galleries of his day including Vose, Kennedy, and Doll & Richards. His paintings are now sold by major galleries including Spanierman Gallery and Blue Hill Gallery.

Connaway's work is represented in major public collections throughout the United States, including:

- Museum of Fine Arts, Boston
- Portland Museum of Art, Portland, Maine
- Monhegan Museum, Maine
- Farnsworth Art Museum, Rockland, Maine
- Indianapolis Museum of Art, Indianapolis, Indiana
- Arkell Museum, Canajoharie, New York
- Colby College Museum of Art, Waterville, Maine
- Washington County Museum of Fine Arts, Hagerstown, Maryland
