= Manana Island =

Manana Island can refer to:

- Mānana, an island of Hawaii
- Manana Island (Maine), location of the Manana Island Sound Signal Station, a National Register of Historic Places site
