= Manana Island Sound Signal Station =

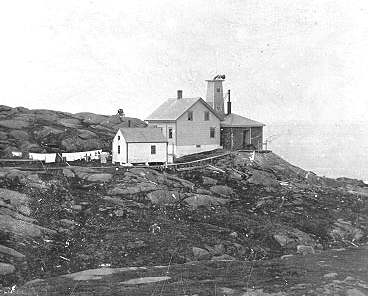
- Undated US Coast Guard photo
- Location: Manana Island, Maine
- Coordinates: 43°45′48″N 69°19′36″W
- Constructed: 1855
- Automated: 1988
- Shape: Brick House
- Markings: Brown
- Heritage: National Register of Historic Places listed place
- Fog signal: HORN: 2 every 60s
- Manana Island Fog Signal Station
- U.S. National Register of Historic Places
- U.S. Historic district
- Nearest city: Monhegan, Maine
- Area: less than one acre
- Built: 1855
- Architect: US Lighthouse Board
- MPS: Light Stations of the United States MPS
- NRHP reference No.: 02001412
- Added to NRHP: December 02, 2002

The Manana Island Sound Signal Station is an active fog signal station on Manana Island, Maine, United States. Established in 1855, it is one of the only separately managed fog signals in the United States, having been operationally independent of Monhegan Island Light for most of its existence. It is also home to the only known fog signal trumpet tower, built in 1889. The station was listed on the National Register of Historic Places as Manana Island Fog Signal Station in 2002.

== Description ==
Monhegan is a small island community 10 miles (16 km) off the coast of Maine, consisting of Monhegan Island, and a number of nearby smaller islands. Its harbor is situated in the channel between Monhegan and Manana Islands, just west of the main island. The Manana Island Sound Signal Station is located at the highest point on Manana Island, and consists of several buildings and structures. The present signal equipment is housed in small brick building, built in 1906 on the foundation of the original signal house, originally for use as an oil house. The former main signal building is a brick structure about 33 by 20 feet (10.1 m × 6.1 m), built in 1889 on the site of an earlier wood-frame structure. It is topped by a low tower that was originally used to house a Daboll trumpet. A shed covering several iron pressure tanks is attached to one side. The keeper's house, dating to 1855, is a much-altered 1 1/2-story wood-frame building.

The station is served by an electromechanical hoist, to facilitate the movement of materials to the site. It consists of a set of rails, which extend from the boat landing on the island's east side to a hoist house, housing the motor, near the other buildings. This facility was built in 1905, and is maintained for use.

== History ==
Monhegan Island has long been an important marine navigation landmark on the coast of Maine. Because it is frequently beset by fog, the United States Lighthouse Board proposed in 1853 the construction of a fog signal for Manana Island. Congress appropriated funds for the station in 1854, and in 1855 a manually sounded bell was installed on Manana Island, about one mile west of Monhegan Island Light. In 1856 an automatic striking machine was installed. After further funding was secured, a steam-powered Daboll trumpet, then an experimental device, was installed in 1870. It was replaced in 1872 by a whistle, and the trumpet was moved to the Portland Head Light.

Originally administratively part of Monhegan Island Light, the fog signal was placed under separate administration in 1876. In 1877 a new Daboll trumpet was installed. It was replaced in 1912 by an air siren, and in 1937 a radio beacon was added to the site. The station was automated in 1986, and the radio tower was removed in 1995.

== See also ==
- Fiddler's Reach Fog Signal
- National Register of Historic Places listings in Lincoln County, Maine
