= Frances Kornbluth =

American painter (1920–2014)

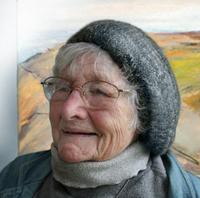
- Born: July 26, 1920; New York City, U.S.
- Died: May 26, 2014 (aged 93); Dayville, CT
- Education: Reuben Tam; William Kienbusch; Robert Richenburg
- Known for: Painter
- Movement: Abstract Expressionism
- Website: franceskornbluth.com

Frances Kornbluth (July 26, 1920 – May 26, 2014) was an American painter who spent 57 summers working on Monhegan Island off the coast of Maine. Her work is associated with Abstract Expressionism.

== Biography ==
Frances Kornbluth was born in New York City on July 26, 1920. Originally intent on becoming a composer, Kornbluth graduated from Brooklyn College in 1940 with a degree in music; however, in the 1950s she focused her creative energies on painting. Kornbluth studied at the Brooklyn Museum Art School from 1955 to 1959, where she first met Reuben Tam, and went on to receive a master's degree from the Pratt Institute in 1962. It was Tam who first introduced Kornbluth to Monhegan Island and helped define her as an artist. Beginning in 1957, Kornbluth started spending her summers on Monhegan Island, where her friends and contemporaries included Lynne Mapp Drexler and Elena Jahn. Kornbluth died on May 26, 2014, at the age of 93. During her lifetime, she was a member of the National Association of Women Artists (NAWA), a charter member of the National Museum of Women in the Arts (NMWA) and a founding member of Women Artists of Monhegan Island (WAMI).

== Works ==
The natural environment was the primary source of Kornbluth's inspiration, particularly that of Monhegan Island where she summered and painted from 1957 to 2013. Kornbluth painted at her studio in Lobster Cove on Monhegan and at her studio in Northeastern Connecticut. She worked in oil, pastel, acrylic, watercolor, ink and mixed media collage.

== Public Collections ==
- Binghamton University Art Museum, Binghamton, New York
- Colby College, Waterville, Maine
- Chrysler Museum of Art, Norfolk, Virginia
- Hudson River Museum, Yonkers, New York
- Monhegan Museum of Art & History, Monhegan Island, Maine
- Portland Museum of Art, Portland, Maine

== Selected Exhibitions ==
- "A Common Bond: Women Artists of Monhegan Island" at the Monhegan Museum of Art & History (2024)
- "Maine Women Pioneers III" at the University of New England (2013)
- "Collage: Piecing It Together" at the Portland Museum of Art (2010)
- "On Island: Women Artists of Monhegan" at the University of New England (2007)
- "Monhegan: The Abstracted Island" at the Bates College Museum of Art (2001)
- "Overview: Four Decades" at the University of Connecticut (1996)
- "Artists From Monhegan" at the Allentown Art Museum (1974)

== Awards ==
- Lifetime Achievement Award, Brooklyn College (2000)
- Miriam E. Halpern Memorial Award, National Association of Women Artists (1992)
- John Carl Georgo Memorial Award, National Association of Women Artists (1989)
- Elizabeth Morse Genius Foundation Prize, National Association of Women Artists (1982)
- Helen Henningson Memorial Prize for Oil, National Association of Women Artists (1977)
- Charles H. Woodbury Prize for Landscape, National Association of Women Artists (1975)
- The Elisabeth Rungius Fulda Memorial Prize for Lyrical Landscape, National Association of Women Artists (1968)
- Medal of Honor, National Association of Women Artists (1968)
- Catherine & Henry J. Gaisman Prize for Watercolor, National Association of Women Artists (1961)
- Medal of Honor, National Association of Women Artists (1961)
