= Samoset =

17th-century Abenaki sagamore

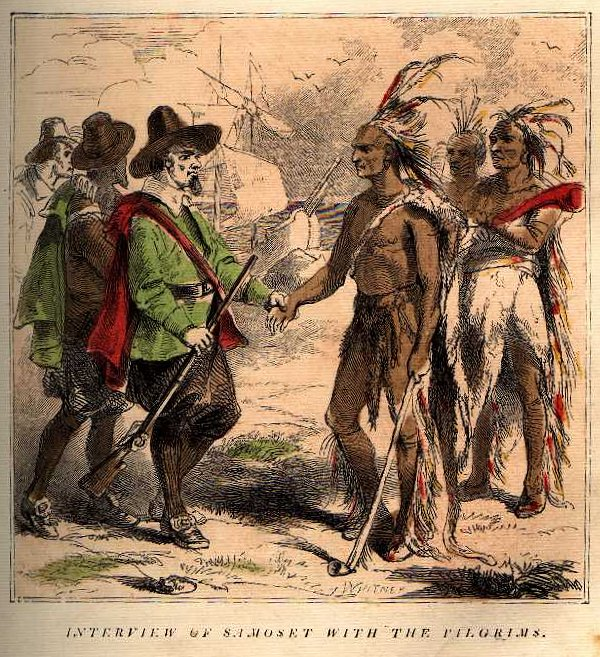
The cover of the 1853 book, Interview of Samoset with the Pilgrims, depicting Samoset meeting the Pilgrims

Samoset (also Somerset, c. 1590 – c. 1653) was an Abenaki sagamore and the first American Indian to make contact with the Pilgrims of Plymouth Colony in New England. He startled the colonists on March 16, 1621, by walking into Plymouth Colony and greeting them in English.

== History ==
Samoset was a sagamore, or subordinate chief, of an Eastern Abenaki tribe that resided in Maine. An English fishing camp had been established in the Gulf of Maine, where Samoset learned some English from fishermen who came to fish off Monhegan Island, coming to know most local ship captains by name.

The Abenaki language is an Algonquian language related to the Massachusett language of the Nauset and Wampanoag people of the area around Plymouth Colony, and Samoset was visiting Wampanoag chief Massasoit at the time of the historic event. He entered the settlement at Plymouth on March 16, 1621, greeted the colonists in English, and asked for beer. He spent the night with the Pilgrims on that occasion, then returned at another time with five other Indians who brought deer skins to trade. It was a Sunday and the colonists declined to trade that day, but they offered the men some food. Samoset came back on March 22, 1621, with Squanto, the last remaining member of the Patuxet tribe. Squanto spoke much better English than Samoset, and he arranged a meeting with Massasoit.

In 1624, English Captain Christopher Levett entertained Samoset and other Indian leaders in the harbor of Portland, Maine. Samoset is believed to have died around 1653 in Pemaquid.

== Name ==
The orthography of Samoset's name varied depending on who was discussing him. He appeared as Samoset in some accounts and as Somerset in others. This is probably a folk etymology from Somerset in the West Country of England, home of many sailors.

== Meeting with colonists ==
Mourt's Relation, a 1622 account of the early days of Plymouth Colony, describes Samoset's visit:

Friday the 16th a fair warm day towards; this morning we determined to conclude of the military orders, which we had begun to consider of before but were interrupted by the savages, as we mentioned formerly; and whilst we were busied hereabout, we were interrupted again, for there presented himself a savage, which caused an alarm. He very boldly came all alone and along the houses straight to the rendezvous, where we intercepted him, not suffering him to go in, as undoubtedly he would, out of his boldness. He saluted us in English, and bade us welcome, for he had learned some broken English among the Englishmen that came to fish at Monchiggon, and knew by name most of the captains, commanders, and masters that usually come. He was a man free in speech, so far as he could express his mind, and of a seemly carriage. We questioned him of many things; he was the first savage we could meet withal. He said he was not of these parts, but of Morattiggon, and one of the sagamores or lords thereof, and had been eight months in these parts, it lying hence a day's sail with a great wind, and five days by land. He discoursed of the whole country, and of every province, and of their sagamores, and their number of men, and strength. The wind being to rise a little, we cast a horseman's coat about him, for he was stark naked, only a leather about his waist, with a fringe about a span long, or little more; he had a bow and two arrows, the one headed, and the other unheaded. He was a tall straight man, the hair of his head black, long behind, only short before, none on his face at all; he asked some beer, but we gave him strong water and biscuit, and butter, and cheese, and pudding, and a piece of mallard, all which he liked well, and had been acquainted with such amongst the English. He told us the place where we now live is called Patuxet, and that about four years ago all the inhabitants died of an extraordinary plague, and there is neither man, woman, nor child remaining, as indeed we have found none, so as there is none to hinder our possession, or to lay claim unto it. All the afternoon we spent in communication with him; we would gladly have been rid of him at night, but he was not willing to go this night. Then we thought to carry him on shipboard, wherewith he was well content, and went into the shallop, but the wind was high and the water scant, that it could not return back. We lodged him that night at Stephen Hopkins' house, and watched him.

The next day he went away back to the Massasoits, from whence he said he came, who are our next bordering neighbors. They are sixty strong, as he saith. The Nausets are as near southeast of them, and are a hundred strong, and those were they of whom our people were encountered, as before related. They are much incensed and provoked against the English, and about eight months ago slew three Englishmen, and two more hardly escaped by flight to Monchiggon; they were Sir Ferdinando Gorges his men, as this savage told us, as he did likewise of the huggery, that is, fight, that our discoverers had with the Nausets, and of our tools that were taken out of the woods, which we willed him should be brought again, otherwise, we would right ourselves. These people are ill affected towards the English, by reason of one Hunt, a master of a ship, who deceived the people, and got them under color of trucking with them, twenty out of this very place where we inhabit, and seven men from Nauset, and carried them away, and sold them for slaves like a wretched man (for twenty pound a man) that cares not what mischief he doth for his profit.

Saturday, in the morning we dismissed the savage, and gave him a knife, a bracelet, and a ring; he promised within a night or two to come again, and to bring with him some of the Massasoits, our neighbors, with such beavers' skins as they had to truck with us.

Other sources reiterate that Samoset asked the pilgrims for beer.
