= Lynne Mapp Drexler =

American artist (1928–1999)

- Born: May 21, 1928; Newport News, Virginia
- Died: December 30, 1999 (aged 71); Monhegan Island, Maine
- Education: Robert Motherwell, Hans Hofmann
- Known for: Painter
- Movement: Abstract, Representational
- Spouse: John Hultberg

Lynne Mapp Drexler (May 21, 1928– December 30, 1999) was an American abstract and representational artist, painter and photographer.

== Early life and education ==
Lynne Drexler was born on May 21, 1928 and raised in the Newport News, Virginia, area. Her parents were Norman E. Drexler, a manager at a public utility, and Lynne P. Drexler. At the age of 11, she was an only child and had been living in Raleigh Terrace, Elizabeth City (now Hampton), Virginia. She began painting as a child. Later, Drexler took art classes in Virginia at the Richmond Professional Institute and at the College of William & Mary.

She moved to New York City in the mid to late 1950s to further her study art under Robert Motherwell at Hunter College and Hans Hofmann, under their tutelage she developed an interest in Abstract Expressionism. Motherwell taught her composition and draftsmanship techniques and the philosophy "that to be an artist meant first and foremost that one had to create work worthy of attention". Her tendency to create vibrant paintings using a free brush stroke was influenced by Hofmann and the work of Henri Matisse. Hofmann also introduced the notion that composition is influenced by color, which he called the "push-pull" concept.

== Adulthood ==
=== Cosmopolitan life ===
In the late 1950s, she was an abstract expressionist and was "counted among an important group of women artists whose figural and landscape works were often overlooked during the heyday of post-abstract expressionist modernism – artists such as Jane Freilicher, Lois Dodd, and Jane Wilson."

She would often go to opera and symphony performances with a sketchpad and colored crayons in hand to make sketches inspired by the music. Drexler's Pattern and Decoration embroidery and patchwork influenced some of her later works, similar designs often appeared in her painting's backgrounds.

In 1961, Drexler met fellow artist John Hultberg at The Artist's Club in New York. Artists there discussed abstract expressionism. She had her first solo exhibition of eleven works at Tanager Gallery. Drexler and Hultberg were married on May 25, 1962 and for three years they traveled and lived in Mexico, the West Coast and Hawaii. They then lived at New York's Chelsea Hotel in the late 1960s. In an exhibition of seven married couples, Mr. and Mrs. at Alonzo, Drexler's painting "is concerned with juxtaposing diversely patterned areas of vivid colors" while her husband's work was said to reflect "an outer-space, figurative orientation".

=== Monhegan Island ===
The couple bought a summer house off the coast of Maine on Monhegan Island in 1971. By 1983, Drexler lived year-around near Lighthouse Hill on Monhegan Island, an artists' haven off the coast of Maine. The island people and landscape were the subject of many of her paintings from that time. Drexler's paintings became less strictly abstract and exhibited a synthesis of abstract and representational influences.

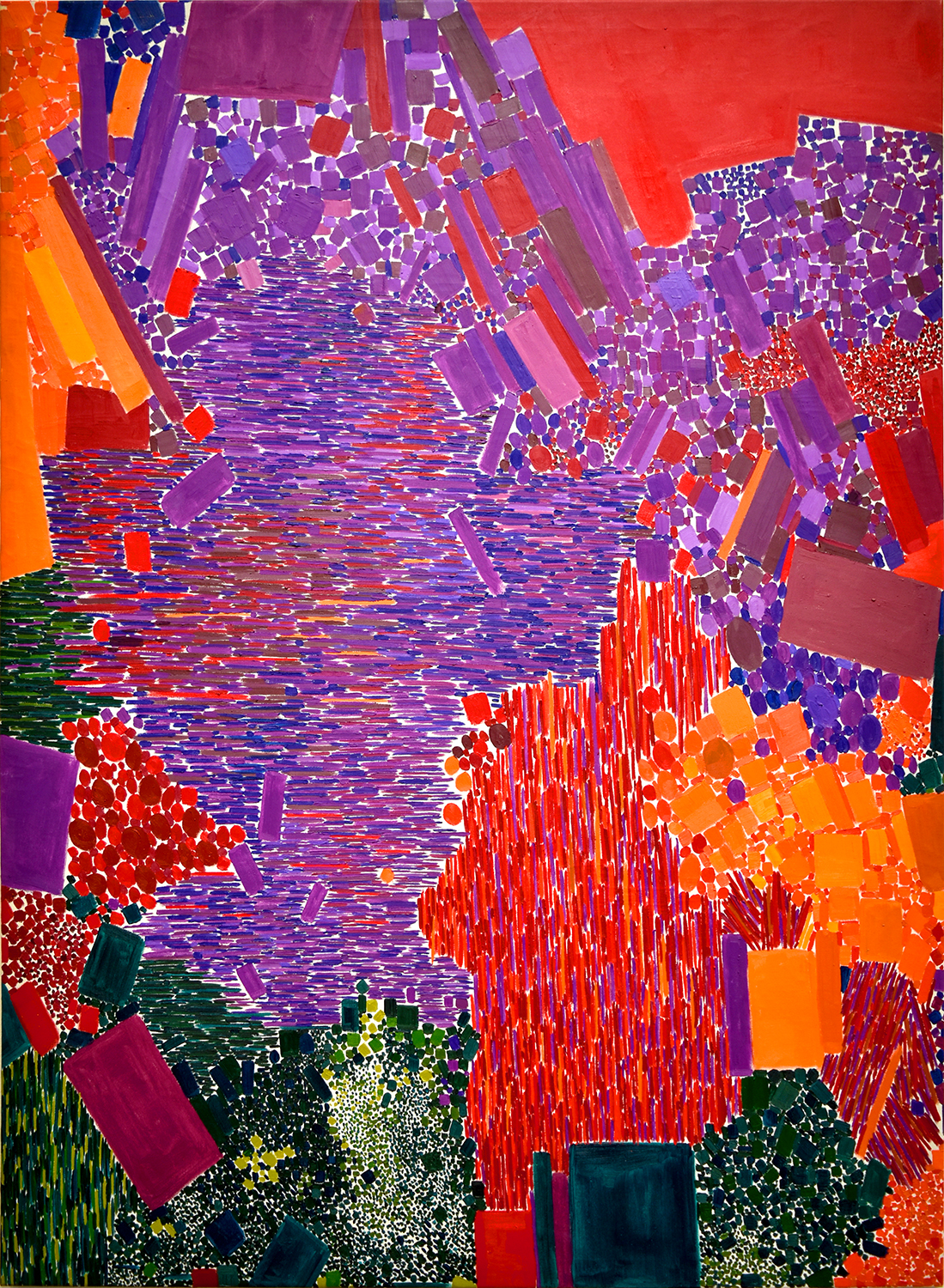
Example of Lynne Drexler's early work, dated 1963, titled "Calm Cove"

Drexler died December 30, 1999, at her home on Monhegan Island.

== Posthumous exhibitions ==
After she died, her work was exhibited at a number of galleries, including the Anita Shapolsky Gallery in New York City, and the Jameson Modern in Portland, Maine. The first comprehensive exhibit of her work – showcasing over fifty paintings, photographic images and textiles – ran at the Monhegan Museum in August and September 2008. It then ran at the Portland Museum of Art from December 6, 2008, through March 1, 2009. The exhibition was organized by the Monhegan Historical and Cultural Museum Association. In 2010, her works were shown at the Portland Museum and at the McCormick Gallery in Chicago.

In 2023, White Cube announced representation of the Lynne Drexler Archive.

In May of 2024, Farnsworth Art Museum launched an exhibition entitled Lynne Drexler: Color Notes that featured a collection of her works along with an accompanied playlist that ran from May 4, 2024 through January 12, 2025.

== Collections ==
Her works are in the collections of:

- Art Institute of Chicago, Chicago, Illinois
- Bates College, Lewiston, Maine
- Brooklyn Museum, Brooklyn, New York
- Farnsworth Art Museum, Rockland, Maine
- Hudson River Museum, Yonkers, New York
- Muscarelle Museum of Art, Williamsburg, Virginia
- Museum of Modern Art, New York
- National Gallery of Art, Washington, D.C.
- Portland Museum of Art, Maine
- Prentice Hall Collection, Englewood Cliffs, New Jersey
- Provincetown Art Association and Museum, Provincetown, Massachusetts
- Queens Museum, Queens, New York
- Tamarind Print Collection, Los Angeles
- University of Massachusetts, Amherst
