= Rockwell Kent Cottage and Studio =

Historic house in Maine, United States

- U.S. National Register of Historic Places
- Location: Horn Hill Road, Monhegan Island, Maine
- Coordinates: 43°45′57″N 69°19′8″W
- Built: 1906, 1910
- Architect: Rockwell Kent
- NRHP reference No.: 92000278
- Added to NRHP: April 8, 1992

The Rockwell Kent Cottage and Studio are a pair of historic buildings associated with the artist Rockwell Kent on Monhegan Island off the coast of the United States state of Maine. Built in 1906 and 1910 by Kent, they are an important reminder of his presence on the island. Both properties were later owned by artist James E. Fitzgerald, and now serve as a museum displaying his works. They were listed on the National Register of Historic Places in 1992.

== Description ==
The Rockwell Kent Cottage and Studio occupy two discontiguous parcels of land on the north side of Horn Hill Road, overlooking the village on Monhegan Island. The cottage is a Cape style single-story wood-frame structure, with a side gable roof and shingled exterior. Short ells extend to either side from the gable ends. The main facade faces south, and is three bays wide, with the entrance in the rightmost bay, framed by sidelight windows.

The studio is located about 800 feet (240 m) from the cottage, down a winding path. It is a slightly larger building, also a single story, with a gable-on-hip roof on its main block, with lower sections extending from the narrow ends. While the cottage is essentially vernacular in style, the studio has some distinctive Shingle style features, with a porch-like entry recessed under a hip roof on one of the ells. A wall dormer rises on the north side of the building, making space for a large picture window providing light to the studio space.

== History ==
The buildings are two of four that were designed by Rockwell Kent during the years he spent on the island. The cottage was built in 1906, its design and construction overseen by Kent, whose formal training included architecture and design. He built a similar cottage for a neighbor (since altered), and another small house for his mother. In 1910 Kent built the studio, in part as a place to operate an art school in partnership with an art school friend, Julius Golz. It is here that Kent painted some of his best-known works, including Toilers of the Sea, Winter-Monhegan Island, and Down to the Sea.

Kent left the island in 1910, selling the cottage, which was rented to his cousin Alice Kent Stoddard, a fellow artist. In 1948, Alice Kent Stoddard purchased the John Willey House from Alma Marshall Wincapaw, and Rockwell Kent repurchased his cottage from Alice, then he again spent several years on the island. In 1952, James E. Fitzgerald purchased the studio and six years later purchased the house. Upon Fitzgerald's death in 1971, his buildings and artwork were inherited by Edgar and Anne Hubert, who were his patrons and friends. Fitzgerald's estate, including the buildings, were bequeathed to the Monhegan Museum and Library upon Anne Hubert's death in 2004.

== Museum ==
During the summer, the historic house museum is open to the public on a limited basis to view the works of Fitzgerald. A symposium was held on the 100th anniversary of the building's construction in 2007. The Kent Collector intended to publish papers from the symposium. It is produced by the Rockwell Kent Archives at the SUNY Plattsburgh Art Museum.

== See also ==
- Kent Cottage, Brigus, Newfoundland
- National Register of Historic Places listings in Lincoln County, Maine
