= Thomas Cornell (artist) =

American artist

Thomas Browne Cornell (March 1, 1937 – December 7, 2012) was an American artist.

Cornell was known for empirical drawings and paintings. His work involved moral content concerning global, social, and environmental justice. He was the Richard E. Steele Artist-in-Residence at Bowdoin College, in Brunswick, Maine, until June 2012 when he formally retired.

== Biography ==
Thomas Cornell was born March 1, 1937, in Cleveland, Ohio. Cornell studied art at Amherst College (B.A., 1959) and at Yale University School of Art and Architecture (1959–1960). In 1960, Thomas Cornell became a professor of art at the University of California, Santa Barbara. In 1962, Cornell became a professor of visual art at Bowdoin College, where he taught until his death. He was a visiting professor at Princeton University in 1969–70. In 2001 Bowdoin College appointed Cornell the Richard E. Steele Professor of Visual Arts.

In his early career, Cornell was known mainly for drawings and prints. Cornell's prints were included in exhibitions at the Museum of Modern Art, Philadelphia Print Club, DeCordova Museum, University of San Diego, Brooklyn Museum, the National Council of Fine Arts and elsewhere. During this time, Cornell also founded his own publishing house, called Tragos Press, and printed editions of books and broadsides. In 1972, the New-York-based Associated American Artists held a one-man exhibition of Cornell's prints.

Later Cornell turned primarily to oil painting. This included both large narrative compositions and landscapes. In 1969, Cornell's anti-war triptych "Dance of Death" was featured in the travelling museum exhibition of young New England painters. In 1985, Cornell was commissioned by the John Hancock Mutual Life Insurance Company to create a four seasons set of paintings to hang in their corporate headquarters in Boston. Beginning in 1987, Cornell devoted himself to a series of large figurative paintings concerning community. His later work has incorporated the coastal landscape of Maine.

Later on in life, Tom Cornell became involved in Occupy Brunswick, a grassroots movement fighting for local change and justice. He was working on an activist piece for the movement at the time of his death.

== Thomas Cornell's Art ==
Cornell's art revolves around themes of social justice and mankind's relationship with nature. Critic Martica Sawin states: "Unlike many artists who are involved with the art-making act to such an extent that medium and process become dominant over intentionality, Cornell puts the idea before the act. Art for him has from the start been a means of giving form to a specific socially significant theme." Michael Kammen refers to Cornell's more recent work as having adopted "a pastoral style that highlighted lyrical celebrations of life and nature. He sought to create images of people so beautiful that they would inspire people to change their lives." Museum curator Karl Nickel says, in reference to Cornell's Dance of Death, "It is a splendid and civilized thing to see an artist aroused, to sense both the Olympian authority of his accusation and the humanity of his understanding."

=== Awards and membership ===
Cornell has received the Louis Comfort Tiffany Foundation Award (1961), the Fulbright Grant (1966), the National Foundation on the Arts and Humanities Fellowship (1966–67), Ford Foundation Grant (1969–70), and the Pollock-Krasner Foundation Grant (1993).

Cornell was a founding member of the Union of Maine Visual Artists, and served as president from 1991 to 1992. He has also been elected to the National Academy of Design and the Grolier Club.

=== Museum Collections ===
The art of Thomas Cornell is included in the following collections:

- Achenbach Foundation, San Francisco
- Bibliotheque Nationale, Paris
- Bowdoin College Museum of Art
- Cleveland Museum of Art
- Harvard University
- Massachusetts Institute of Technology
- The Museum of Modern Art, New York
- National Museum of American Art, Washington, D.C.
- Smithsonian American Art Museum
- New York Public Library
- Princeton University Library
- University of California Art Gallery
- University of North Carolina
- Beinecke Library at Yale University

== Death ==
Thomas Cornell died of cancer at the age of 75 on December 7, 2012.
