= Jon Imber =

American artist

- Born: 1950; Baldwin, New York, U.S.
- Died: 2014 (aged 63–64); Somerville, Massachusetts, U.S.
- Education: Cornell University (BFA, 1972), Boston University (MFA, 1977)
- Known for: Painting, plein air landscapes, abstraction
- Style: Early figurative painting; later landscapes and abstraction
- Movement: Boston Expressionism, Abstraction
- Spouse: Jill Hoy
- Awards: AVA award, Engelhard Foundation award, National Academy Museum's Altman Award, Boston University's Distinguished Alumni Award

Jon Imber (1950–2014) was an American artist.

Known for his plein air landscape paintings, Imber experimented with different influences, styles, and subject matter all his life. Early in his career, he was a figurative painter, but he later fully embraced landscapes and abstraction. The former director of the Danforth Museum called him one of the most important painters of his generation and placed him in the lineage of Boston Expressionists.

== Painting ==
Imber achieved early recognition for figurative paintings that have been described as “hulking, volumetric figures with tiny strokes... a blend of Romanesque art and blocky, cartoonish figures executed with brushy, fastidious mark-making, akin to Van Gogh’s.”

Rather than resting on the success of his figurative style, Imber challenged himself and tackled new material and new subject matter. His focus shifted to portraits, then to large, studio landscapes, then to figures in landscapes, then to plein air landscapes, and finally to landscapes on the edge of abstraction. Throughout these changes he maintained a unique style of gestural brush strokes and an intimate sense of knowing his subject that goes beyond observation.

Reviewing a 2013 career survey of Imber's work, the art critic Sebastian Smee said, “Life, in Imber’s paintings, unfurls with wayward force, like a thick, flicked rope. It takes on vital cadences. It laughs at itself, too."

=== Influences ===
Imber studied with Philip Guston at Boston University and he often cited Willem de Kooning as one of his influences. Others have noted that Marsden Hartley, Vincent Van Gogh, Paul Cézanne, and Max Beckmann were among his influences.

=== Museums and collections ===
Imber's paintings are held in numerous collections and museums around the U.S., including the Museum of Fine Arts Boston, Harvard's Fogg Art Museum, the New Orleans Museum of Art, the DeCordova Museum, the Farnsworth Museum, the Danforth Museum, the Houston Museum of Fine Arts, the Bowdoin College Museum of Art, the Davis Museum at Wellesley, and the Rose Art Museum at Brandeis. He was the subject of a 2014 retrospective at the Godwin-Ternbach Museum at Queens College in New York.

Imber was also the recipient of numerous awards and fellowships, including two National Endowment for the Arts fellowships, a Massachusetts Artists fellowship, an AVA award, an Engelhard Foundation award, the National Academy Museum's Altman Award, Boston University's Distinguished Alumni Award, two grants from the Massachusetts State Arts Lottery, and a Ballinglen Arts Foundation fellowship. His work has been included in many publications including Paintings of Maine: A New Selection by Carl Little and Boston Modern: Figurative Expressionism As Alternative Modernism by Judith Bookbinder.

== Biography ==
=== Education and career ===
Imber was born in Baldwin, New York in 1950. He received his BFA from Cornell in 1972 and received his MFA from Boston University in 1977. Imber later taught at Harvard for 26 years and also taught for many years at the Rhode Island School of Design. He lived in Somerville, Massachusetts and Stonington, Maine. He was married to artist Jill Hoy.

=== ALS ===
In 2012, Imber was diagnosed with the neurodegenerative disease ALS, also known as Lou Gehrig's disease. After losing the ability to use his dominant right hand, he taught himself to paint with his left hand. When the muscles in both arms began to fail, he began painting with a brush attached to one of the fingers of his left hand. He also experimented with painting using a brush attached to a metal brace on his forehead. Despite the physical limitations caused by ALS, he was a prolific painter until his death.

Imber was the subject of the feature-length documentary titled Imber’s Left Hand , released in 2014, directed by Richard Kane.

=== Death ===
Imber died in Somerville, Massachusetts in 2014.

== See also ==
- Boston Expressionism
- List of Maine Painters
