= Daboll trumpet =

Type of foghorn

U.S. patent 28837A "Fog Alarm" by C.L. Daboll, granted June 26, 1860

A Daboll trumpet is an air trumpet foghorn which was developed by an American, Celadon Leeds Daboll, of New London, Connecticut. It was basically a small coal-fired hot air engine, which compressed air in a cylinder on top of which was a reed horn.

The Daboll trumpet, consists of a steel reed vibrating within a horn, which uses the hot air engine to force cold air by means of an air pump into a boiler, from which it escapes into the horn through a valve, causing the vibrations of the reed, which are regulated by an automatic cam.

Daboll's cousin, Charles Miner Daboll (1823-), inventor of the Daboll bushing, is credited with developing the Daboll trumpet for practical use.

The following citation is from: Scientific American Supplement, Vol. XIX, No. 470, Jan. 3, 1885.

The Daboll trumpet was invented by Mr. C.L. Daboll, of Connecticut, who was experimenting to meet the announced wants of the United States Lighthouse Board. The largest consists of a huge trumpet seventeen feet long, with a throat three and one-half inches in diameter, and a flaring mouth thirty-eight inches across. In the trumpet is a resounding cavity, and a tongue-like steel reed ten inches long, two and three-quarter inches wide, one inch thick at its fixed end, and half that at its free end. Air is condensed in a reservoir and driven through the trumpet by hot air or steam machinery at a pressure of from fifteen to twenty pounds, and is capable of making a shriek which can be heard at a great distance for a certain number of seconds each minute, by about one-quarter of the power expended in the case of the whistle. In all his experiments against and at right angles and at other angles to the wind, the trumpet stood first and the whistle came next in power. In the trial of the relative power of various instruments made by Gen. Duane in 1874, the twelve-inch whistle was reported as exceeding the first-class Daboll trumpet. Beaseley reports that the trumpet has done good work at various British stations, making itself heard from five to ten miles. The engineer in charge of the lighthouses of Canada says: "The expense for repairs, and the frequent stoppages to make these repairs during the four years they continued in use, made them [the trumpets] expensive and unreliable. The frequent stoppages during foggy weather made them sources of danger instead of aids to navigation. The sound of these trumpets has deteriorated during the last year or so." Gen. Duane, reporting as to his experiments in 1881, says: "The Daboll trumpet, operated by a caloric engine, should only be employed in exceptional cases, such as at stations where no water can be procured, and where from the proximity of other signals it may be necessary to vary the nature of the sound." Thus it would seem that the Daboll trumpet is an exceptionally fine instrument, producing a sound of great penetration and of sufficient power for ordinary practical use, but that to be kept going it requires skillful management and constant care.

"Congress made an appropriation in 1860 authorizing the Light-House Board to make experiments with "Daboll's trumpet and other ear signals," but nothing was done until some time later."

Daboll's trumpet were installed at the following during trials:

- Cape Ann Light - Thatcher's Island ..... " June 30, 1869
- Execution Rocks Light - Long Island Sound January 25, 1869
- Monhegan Island Light - Manana Island Sound Signal Station, Maine, April 4, 1870
- Boston Light - Boston, Massachusetts, October 29, 1871
- Portland Head Light-Portland, Maine November, 1871
- Montauk Point Light - Long Island May 1, 1873
- Highland Light - Cape Cod June 23, 1873

== Sources ==
- "Improved Fog Signal," New York Times, Oct. 26, 1866.
- Scientific American Supplement, Vol. XIX, No. 470, Jan. 3, 1885.
- "Light Station Components," National Park Service.
