= Reuben Tam =

American artist, educator, poet (1916–1991)

Reuben Tam ANA, NA
- Born: January 17, 1916; Kapaʻa, Kauaʻi, Territory of Hawaiʻi
- Died: January 3, 1991 (aged 74); Kauaʻi, Hawaiʻi, U.S.
- Education: California School of Fine Art (BFA)
- Alma mater: University of Hawaiʻi; Columbia University

From Cliffs to Evening by Reuben Tam, oil on canvas, 1978, Honolulu Museum of Art

Reuben Tam (January 17, 1916 – January 3, 1991) was a Chinese American landscape painter, educator, poet and graphic artist.

== Early life and education ==
Tam was born in Kapaʻa on the Hawaiian island of Kauaʻi. He earned a bachelor of arts degree from the University of Hawaiʻi in 1937. He attended classes in 1940 at the California School of Fine Art (later the San Francisco Art Institute). In 1941, he moved to New York City and he continued his studies from 1942 until 1945 at Columbia University with Meyer Schapiro.

== Career ==
Tam became affiliated with the Downtown Gallery in 1945. He is known for his referential abstract landscape paintings showing both land and sea, such as From Cliffs to Evening. In his later career, he worked more in pure abstraction.

From 1946 to the 1974, he taught at the Brooklyn Museum Art School (BMAS). Some of his notable students from BMAS included Frances Kornbluth, Mel Tanner, Jean Arcoleo, Pat Adams, and Richard Mayhew. He spent many summers painting on Monhegan Island in Maine, starting around 1950. He later taught courses at Queens College (City College of New York) and Oregon State University.

== Death and legacy ==
Tam returned to Kauaʻi in 1980, and died there on January 3, 1991, of lymphoma.

Tam's work is held in collection at galleries and museums such as the Addison Gallery of American Art, the Brooklyn Museum of Art, the Butler Institute of American Art, the Corcoran Gallery, Des Moines Art Center, Farnsworth Art Museum, Fisher Gallery, the Hawaii State Art Museum, the Henry Art Gallery (University of Washington), the Hirshhorn Museum and Sculpture Garden, the Honolulu Museum of Art, the Lowe Art Museum (University of Miami), the Metropolitan Museum of Art, the Museum of Modern Art, the Mildred Lane Kemper Art Museum (Washington University in St. Louis), the National Academy of Design, the Newark Museum, Reading Public Museum, the San Diego Museum of Art , Sheldon Memorial Art Gallery, the Smithsonian American Art Museum, the University of Michigan Museum of Art, the Whitney Museum of American Art, and the National Gallery of Art.

== Awards and honors ==
- 1940 – First National Prize for his painting Koko Crater at the Golden Gate International Exposition (GGIE)
- 1948 – Guggenheim Fellowship
- 1975 – Associate National Academician (ANA), National Academy of Design
- 1978 – American Academy and Institute of Arts and Letters, Award in Art
- 1987 – National Academicians (NA), National Academy of Design
- 1989 – Elliot Cades Literary Award for his poetry, from University of Hawaiʻi
