= Elena Jahn =

American painter

Elena Jahn (May 3, 1938, in Moscow, Idaho — November 26, 2014, in Brunswick, Maine) was an artist noted for both figurative paintings and landscapes and for her connection to Monhegan Island, Maine.

== Biography ==
Jahn was born on May 3, 1938, in Moscow, Idaho, to Helen (née Schumann) and Edwin C. Jahn. She spent her childhood in Syracuse, New York. Her family started visiting Monhegan Island in 1949 when her interest in art began. She resided in Rhode Island for ten years, starting in 1966, and helped found a cooperative art gallery in her community. In 1976, she moved to Brunswick, Maine and resided there for 12 years, whereafter she divided her time between a studio on Monhegan and Culebra, Puerto Rico.

Jahn received a Bachelor of Fine Arts from Syracuse University and a Master of Fine Arts the University of Wisconsin, followed by studies in Paris on a Fulbright Grant. She had college and university teaching positions in art departments in Wisconsin, Rhode Island, and Maine and in Nova Scotia and Norway.

She married Garrett C. Clough, a zoologist; they had a daughter and a son.

She died in Brunswick, Maine of complications from scleroderma on November 26, 2014.

== Painting career ==
Jahn's paintings included both the human figure and landscapes from many locations in Scandinavia, Iceland, Paris, Puerto Rico, the American Southwest, Maine and elsewhere in the U.S.

She exhibited at the Portland Museum of Art in its "Maine Perspectives" series in 1991 with a solo display of work from Maine and Puerto Rico. In 2015 her work was displayed retrospectively at the Heron Point Gallery in Portland. Her work was described in multiple surveys of Maine artists.
