= Manana Island (Maine) =

Island in Lincoln County, Maine, United States

Coordinates: 43°45′50″N 69°19′34″W

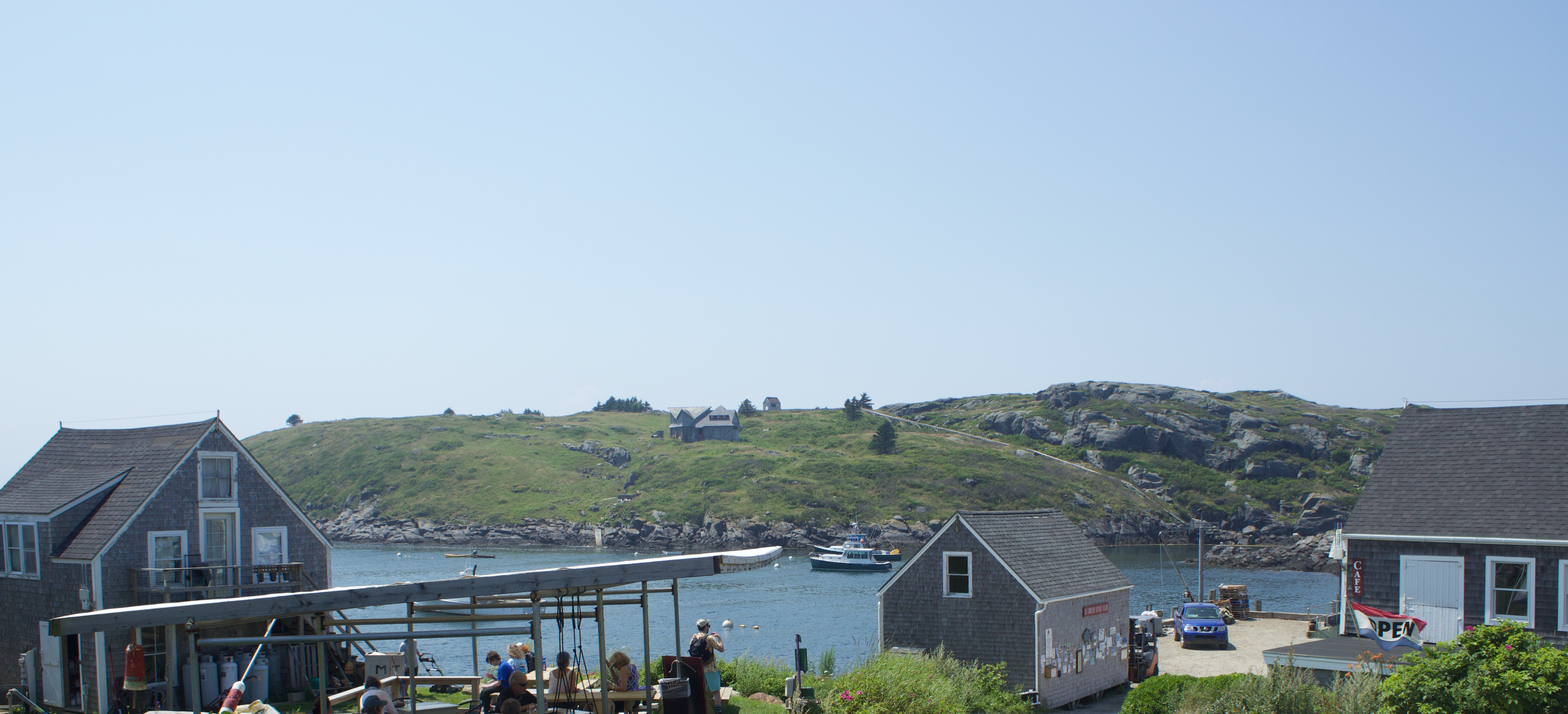
Manana Island taken from Monhegan Island

Manana Island is an island in Lincoln County, Maine, United States, lying adjacent to Monhegan island, about 10 miles (16 km) off Pemaquid Point on the mainland. The island is part of the Plantation of Monhegan.

It is the site of the Manana Island Sound Signal Station, which is listed on the National Register of Historic Places. Archeological sites on the island include a petroglyph and a stone cairn.

A small herd of goats spends summers on the island. They winter in Kennebunk and are rowed over to Manana Island from the Monhegan Harbor in spring.

== See also ==
- List of islands of Maine
