= Abraham Bogdanove =

American painter

Abraham Jacob Bogdanove (September 2, 1886 – August 26, 1946) was an American artist, mural painter, and teacher best known for his seascape paintings of the Maine coast, particularly around Monhegan Island.

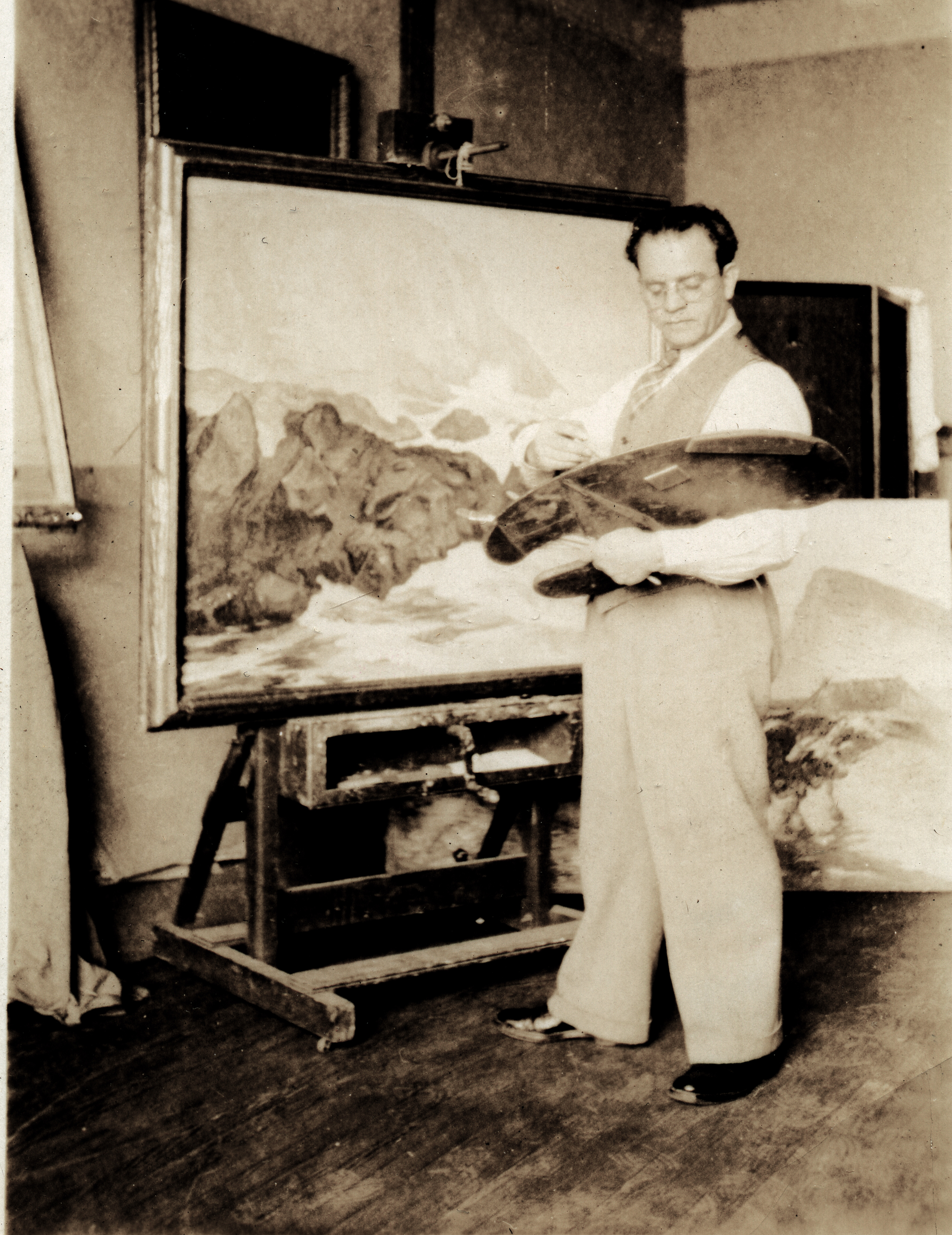
AJ Bogdanove in His Studio

Bogdanove was born in Minsk, (Russian Empire now Belarus), on September 2, 1886, and moved with his family to New York City on December 25, 1900. For the next ten years he studied, first from 1901 to 1903 at Cooper Union, then from 1903 to 1911 at the National Academy of Design, and also at Columbia University School of Architecture from 1908 to 1910, while simultaneously painting advertisement displays and drafting for the New York Journal. From 1909 to 1911 he received prizes for his paintings in National Academy exhibitions.

In 1911, Young Bogdanove was commissioned to paint a mural of "Diana in the Bath" for the Fleischman Baths at 42nd Street and Sixth Avenue. He later took Fleischman to court because Fleischman reneged on the $90 fee and offered bath tickets in lieu of payment, stating that Bogdanove's Diana was not beautiful enough, and that the artist spent more time looking at scantily clad women than he did painting. Bogdanove was awarded $75.

In 1912 Bogdanove received his second mural commission from the Hebrew Sheltering and Guardian Society in Pleasantville, New York; subsequently he painted murals for the Architectural League of New York, Commercial High School, Brooklyn, Alexander Hamilton High School, Brooklyn, Manual Training High School, Brooklyn, Public School 43, Bronx, and the College of the City of New York.

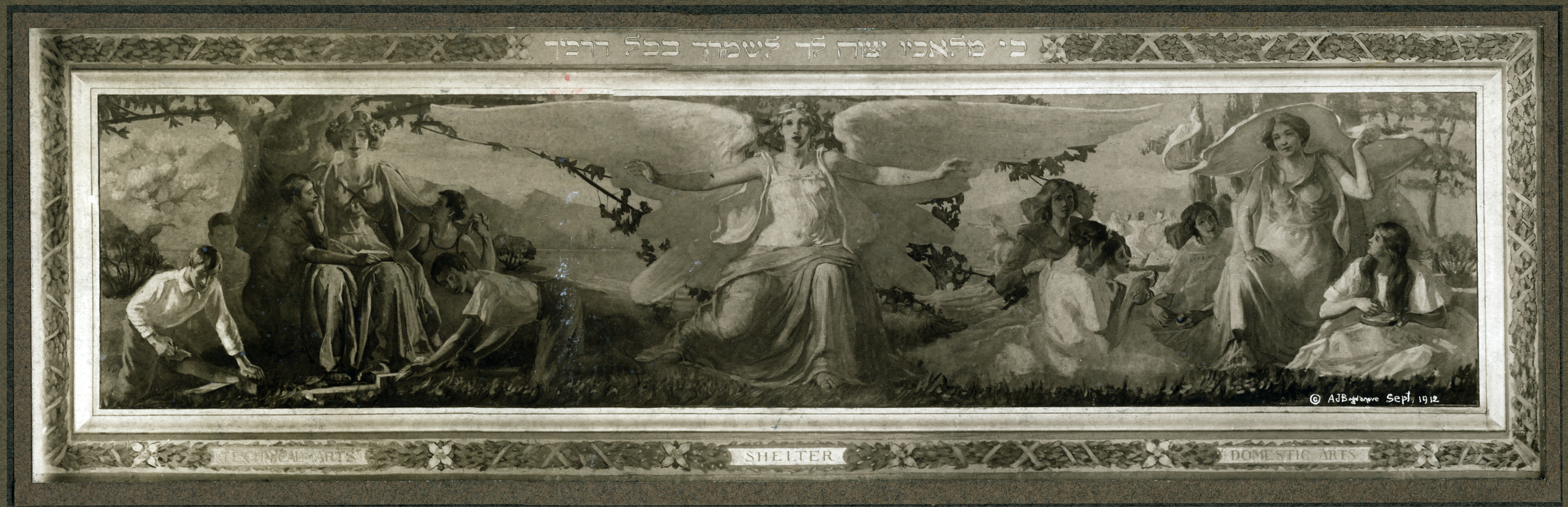
Mural painted in 1912 by AJ Bogdanove for the Hebrew Sheltering and Guardian Society

Bogdanove first visited Maine in 1915, summering at Mount Desert Island, and in 1918 he visited Monhegan Island, purchasing a house there in 1920; thereon he visited Monhegan every year until his death in 1946, becoming an established presence on the island and producing a series of landscapes and seascapes that would constitute the largest part of his painting. For his interest in the powerful dramatic effects of weather on the ocean and land, rather than geographically specific depictions, Bogdanove has been characterized as an heir to Winslow Homer. Of his work on Monhegan, described as "rugged, colorful, and forceful", Bogdanove said in an interview in 1936,

There are a number of reasons why I prefer Monhegan to all other places on the Atlantic coast.... The cliffs are so bold and precipitous and the studies offered by the island shore so inexhaustible. The climate suits me. Perhaps [it is] because it is more like that of Russia, where my ancestors lived.

In an interview in 1945, he explained,

I have painted the Gaspe, the cliffs of Cornwall, the Riviera, but there's a magnetic force in these rocks here, I believe, which brings us back again and again.

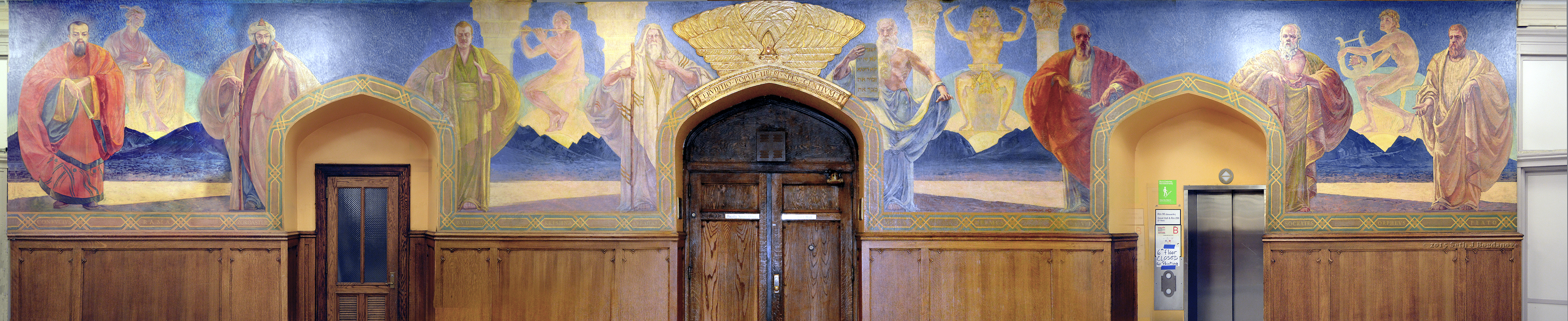
Composite photo comprising fourteen separate photos of A.J. Bogdanove's 1930 mural "The Great Teachers" in the Lincoln Hallway of Shepard Hall in the College of the City of New York, commissioned by CCNY's Class of 1901

From 1913 to 1942 Bogdanove taught art at high schools and colleges in New York City, the longest association being with Townsend Harris High School of the College of the City of New York.

In 1942 Bogdanove moved to Dunbarton, New Hampshire, where he died in 1946. In 1957 he was the subject of an exhibition at the Farnsworth Art Museum in Rockland, Maine, in 1961 at the College of the City of New York, and in three exhibits at New York's Spanierman Gallery between 1997 and 2000.

== Descendants ==
Bogdanove's grandson is comic book illustrator Jon Bogdanove.
