= Nathan Daboll (politician) =

American politician

Member Connecticut General Assembly
- In office 1832–1833

Senator Connecticut Senate
- In office 1833–1835

Judge State of Connecticut, County of New London, Probate District of Stonington
- In office 1843–1845

Personal details
- Born: 14 November 1780 Groton, Connecticut
- Died: 28 August 1863 Groton, Connecticut
- Spouse: Elizabeth
- Profession: Almanac publisher Textbook author

Nathan Daboll (November 14, 1780 – August 28, 1863), was an American politician, judge, textbook author, and almanac publisher.

== Personal life ==
He was the son of Elizabeth (1742–1813) and Nathan Daboll (1750–1818). He had a younger sister, Lydia (born c. 1782).

Daboll married Elizabeth in 1804. They had a son, David Austin Daboll (1813–1895).

He received an Honorary Degree from Wesleyan University in Middletown, Connecticut in 1835.

== Career ==
Daboll served in the Connecticut House of Representatives 1832–1833, and the Connecticut Senate 1833–1835.

He was Clerk of the Court of Probate for the State of Connecticut, County of New London, Connecticut, Probate District of Stonington before serving as a probate judge 1843–1845.

Daboll assisted his father, the notable American Revolution period almanac publisher, with the publication of the New England Almanac. With his son David, he developed Daboll's New Arithmetic, a revision of his father's textbook, Schoolmaster's Assistant.

== Works ==
- Daboll, N. (1819). The New-England almanack for the year of our Lord Christ, 1820. New London, Conn.: Samuel Green. OCLC 15454145.
- Daboll, N. (1821). Nathan Daboll arithmetic book. OCLC 63938517.
- Green, S.; Daboll, N. (1824). The practical accountant, or, Farmer's and mechanic's best method of book keeping for the easy instruction of youth. Designed as a compainion (sic) to Daboll's arithmetic. New London: S. Green. OCLC 5463222.
