= Andrew Winter (artist) =

American painter (1892–1958)

- Born: Andres Jüri Winter; April 7, 1892; Sindi, Governorate of Livonia, Russian Empire
- Died: October 27, 1958 (aged 66); Brookline, Massachusetts
- Education: National Academy of Design; Studied in Paris and Rome; Cape Cod School of Art; Louis C. Tiffany Foundation
- Known for: Monhegan, Maine landscapes and seascapes
- Spouse: Mary Taylor

Andrew Winter (born Andres Jüri Winter; April 7, 1892 – October 27, 1958) was an Estonian-born American artist best known for his landscape paintings on the coast of Maine, particularly his depictions of winter weather.

== Early life ==
Winter was born in Sindi, Estonia as Andres Jüri Winter on April 7, 1892, the son of George and Anna (Klaas) Winter. He went to sea in 1913 on square riggers before sailing on American and British steamships as a mate during World War I.

== Education ==
The Morning After, Monhegan, Maine

In 1921 he became an American citizen, and studied at the National Academy of Design in New York City. In 1925 he went to Paris and Rome to study on a traveling fellowship. He also studied at the Cape Cod School of Art in Provincetown, Massachusetts, and the Louis C. Tiffany Foundation in Oyster Bay, Long Island.

== Career ==
After frequent visits to Monhegan Island off the Maine coast starting in the late 1920s, he and his wife, the artist Mary Taylor (1895–1970), settled there by 1940. He fished with the lobstermen and "painted Monhegan in all seasons, frequently rowing around the island in the worst of weather to capture scenes of the harshest seas and the most dramatic views of the cliffs and rocks."

Winter was attracted to Monhegan's rocky coast, architecture, and the dramatic force of the ocean. The geometric strength, clear lighting, and absence of human presence in his landscapes have invited comparison to the work of his contemporary, Edward Hopper.

Winter exhibited his paintings and won prizes at the National Academy, the Pennsylvania Academy of the Fine Arts, and the Salmagundi Club, and during his lifetime he also exhibited at the Corcoran Gallery of Art in Washington, D.C., the Currier Gallery of Art in Manchester, New Hampshire, and the Memorial Art Gallery in Rochester, New York. His work was included in an exhibition devoted to the work of foreign-born American artists at the 1939 New York World's Fair.

Winter's scrapbooks are in the collection of the Smithsonian Archives of American Art.

== Death ==
Winter died of cancer in a nursing home in Brookline, Massachusetts. His remains were interred at Monhegan Island or scattered at sea there.
