= Monhegan Island Light =

Lighthouse on Monhegan Island, Maine

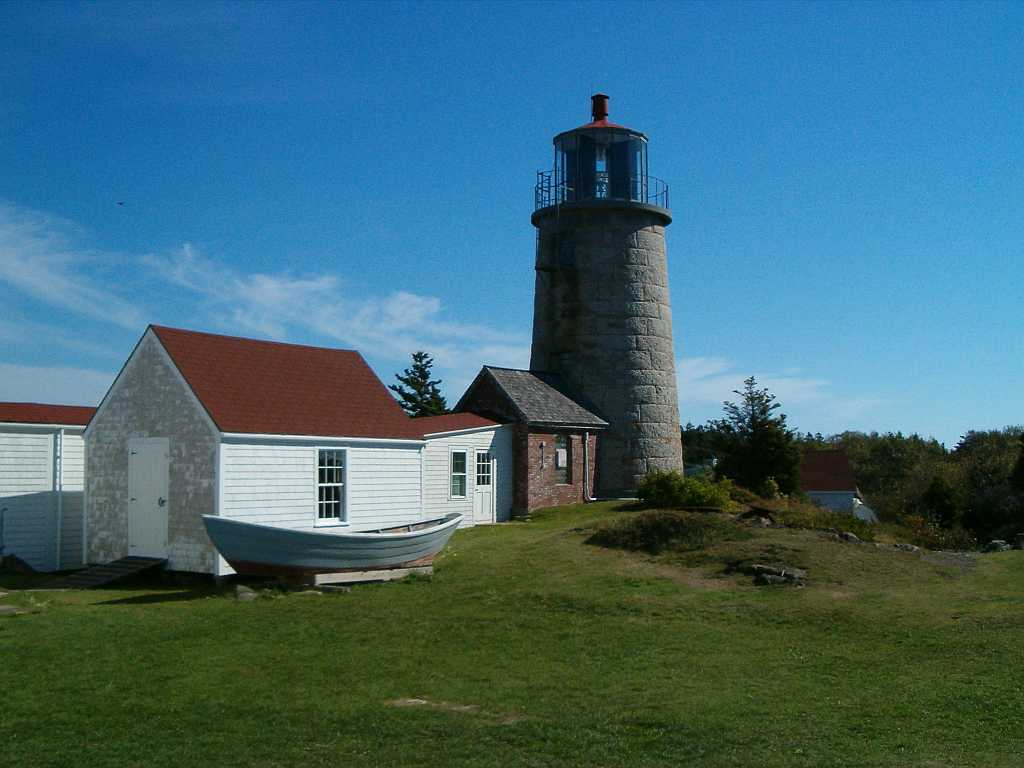
- Location: Monhegan Island, Maine
- Coordinates: 43°45′53″N 69°18′57″W

Tower
- Constructed: 1824
- Foundation: Surface rock
- Construction: Granite blocks
- Automated: 1959
- Height: 14 m (46 ft), 46 ft (14 m)
- Shape: Cylindrical Tower
- Markings: Lt. List says White, but photos show unpainted light gray-brown granite
- Heritage: National Register of Historic Places listed place
- Fog signal: 1854: Bell; 1870: Manana Island Sound Signal Station

Light
- First lit: 1850 (current structure)
- Focal height: 178 feet (54 m)
- Lens: VRB-25
- Range: 20 nautical miles (37 km; 23 mi)
- Characteristic: Fl W 15s
- Monhegan Island Lighthouse and Quarters
- U.S. National Register of Historic Places
- Location: Monhegan Island, Maine
- Built: 1824
- Architect: Alexander Parris
- NRHP reference No.: 80000239
- Added to NRHP: May 07, 1980

Monhegan Island Light is a lighthouse on Monhegan Island, Maine. It was first established in 1824. The present structure was built in 1850. It was Alexander Parris's last significant design. It is the second highest light in Maine — Seguin Light, with a 6-foot taller tower, is 2 feet higher in elevation. It was listed on the National Register of Historic Places as Monhegan Island Lighthouse and Quarters on May 7, 1980, reference number 80000239.

== Description and history ==
Monhegan Island Light stands on a hill near the center of Monhegan Island. The lighthouse complex includes the tower, keeper's house, storage building, and oil house. The tower is a circular structure built out granite blocks with sloping walls, and is 47 feet (14 m) tall, with the lantern house mounted on top. A brick entry house, with gabled roof, is attached to the south side of the tower. The storage building is a single-story wood-frame structure, and the oil house is a small brick structure with a gabled roof. The keeper's house, now serving as the Monhegan Museum, is a 1 1/2-story wood-frame building.

The light station was authorized by Congress in 1822, and went into operation in 1824; the present tower dates to 1850. The light was automated in 1959, and is managed by remote control from the Manana Island Sound Signal Station. (The latter station was administratively managed as part of the Monhegan Light Station from 1850 to 1874, and has been under separate administration since.)

== Monhegan Museum of Art & History ==
The lighthouse building complex is now operated as the Monhegan Museum of Art & History, with exhibits of the island's natural, social, industrial, cultural and artistic history. The lighthouse tower's light mechanism is still operated by the Coast Guard, but the Monhegan Museum owns the tower and opens it to the public on occasion each season.

== See also ==
- National Register of Historic Places listings in Lincoln County, Maine
