= Celadon Leeds Daboll =

Celadon Leeds Daboll (July 18, 1818 – October 13, 1866) was a merchant in New London, Connecticut, where he was born and died. From 1854 to 1861 he was employed in the U.S. Department of the Interior in Washington, D.C.

He conceived the idea of applying the principle of the clarinet to a large trumpet, to serve as a fog signal for mariners, known as the Daboll trumpet.
