= Monhegan, Maine =

- Plantation
- Plantation of Monhegan Island
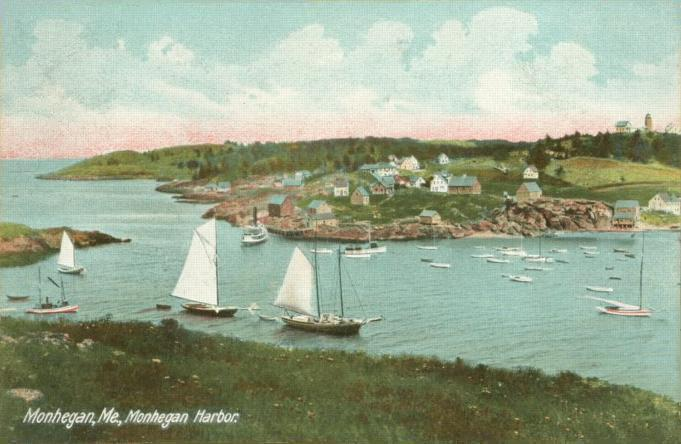
- Monhegan Harbor in 1909
- Nickname: "The Artists' Island"
- Location in Lincoln County and the state of Maine.
- Coordinates: 43°45′59″N 69°18′05″W
- Country: United States
- State: Maine
- County: Lincoln
- First Settlement: 1623
- Incorporated: September 4, 1839

Government
  - Type: Plantation

Area
  - Total: 4.5 sq mi (11.7 km^{2})
  - Land: 0.85 sq mi (2.2 km^{2})
  - Water: 3.7 sq mi (9.5 km^{2})
- Elevation: 10 ft (3.0 m)

Population (2020)
  - Total: 64
  - Density: 75/sq mi (29/km^{2})
- Time zone: UTC-5 (Eastern (EST))
  - Summer (DST): UTC-4 (EDT)
- ZIP code: 04852
- Area code: 207
- FIPS code: 23-46335
- GNIS feature ID: 582600
- U.S. NNL: Designated: 1966
- Website: monheganplantation.gov

Monhegan (/mɒnˈhiːɡən/ mon-HEE-gən) is a historic island plantation in the Gulf of Maine, approximately 12 nautical miles (22 km; 14 mi) off the coast of Maine. Part of Lincoln County, Maine, the island has been inhabited for over 400 years and is renowned as one of America's oldest and most influential artist colonies. With a year-round population of 64 as of the 2020 census, Monhegan fishermen manage Maine's only lobster conservation area.

The island's dramatic landscape of towering cliffs, pristine forests, and rugged coastline has attracted artists, writers, and naturalists for more than a century. Notable artists including Edward Hopper, George Bellows, Rockwell Kent, Jay Hall Connaway, and Jamie Wyeth have found inspiration on its shores. Designated as a National Natural Landmark in 1966 for its exceptional coastal and island flora, Monhegan represents one of the best-preserved island ecosystems in the North Atlantic.

The plantation comprises Monhegan Island proper and the smaller neighboring Manana Island, together forming a unique maritime community that balances historical preservation, environmental conservation, and sustainable tourism. Access is limited to scheduled ferry service from Boothbay Harbor, New Harbor, and Port Clyde, helping preserve the island's distinctive character and fragile ecosystem. Visitors' cars are not permitted on the island, maintaining its historic character and environmental integrity.

== History ==
The name Monhegan is a corruption of Monchiggon, the Abenaki language term for "out-to-sea island" used by Samoset, an Abenaki sagamore and the first Native American to make contact with the Pilgrims of Plymouth Colony, in his early contacts with the English. European explorers Martin Pring visited in 1603, Samuel de Champlain in 1604, George Weymouth in 1605 and Captain John Smith in 1614. The island got its start as a British fishing camp prior to settlement of the Plymouth Colony. Cod was harvested from the rich fishing grounds of the Gulf of Maine, then dried on fish flakes before shipment to Europe. A trading post was built to conduct business with the Indians, particularly in the lucrative fur trade. It was Monhegan traders who taught English to Samoset, the chieftain who in 1621 startled the Pilgrims by boldly walking into their new village at Plymouth and saying: "Welcome, Englishmen." On 28 January 1623 the Council for New England issued a commission for seizing the "Island of Mannahigan". Settlement by William Vengham and William Pomfret in 1623 caused William Bradford to include Monhegan among places that experienced "scattered beginnings" that year.

On April 29, 1717, Monhegan was visited by the Anne, a small square-rigged snow crewed by pirates. She had originally been captured off the Virginia Capes in April by the pirate Samuel Bellamy in the Whydah, which wrecked in a storm on the night of April 26, 1717, off Cape Cod. The Anne made it through the storm with another captured vessel, the Fisher (which was soon abandoned and the pirates aboard her transferred to the Anne). The pirates, led by Richard Noland, arrived at Monhegan on April 29, and waited for the Whydah, for the pirates had not seen or heard about the Whydah wrecking in the storm of the night of April 26. The pirates eventually realized the Whydah was lost, and proceeded to attack vessels at Matinicus Island and Pemaquid (now Bristol). They outfitted for their own uses a small 25-ton sloop belonging to Colonel Stephen Minot they had captured off Matinicus. They abandoned all the other captured vessels (including the Anne) and most of their prisoners at Matinicus on or about May 9, 1717, on Minot's sloop.

Despite success as a fishing and trade center, Monhegan would be caught in the conflict between New England and New France for control of the region. During King Philip's War (1675-1678), dispossessed English settlers from the mainland sought refuge on the island before being relocated elsewhere along the coast. During King William's War (1688-1697), the island was captured for the Kingdom of France in 1689 by Baron de Saint-Castin. He destroyed the fishing fleet and burned the buildings, with many inhabitants escaping to Massachusetts. But even during periods when Monhegan was abandoned, its convenient offshore harbor remained a stopover destination for ships. The end of the French and Indian War in 1763 brought peace to the area, and on September 4, 1839, Monhegan—again under English Colonial control—was incorporated as an island plantation.

In 1824, a conical stone lighthouse was built on the island by order of Congress and President James Monroe. Damaged by storms, it was replaced in 1850 by the present 48 foot (14.6 m) granite tower, with a fog bell station built in 1855 on nearby Manana Island. The island's 1,000 acres (400 ha) of good land encouraged agriculture, with potatoes the chief crop. But fishing was always the most important industry, whether locally or at the Grand Banks. Today, it still dominates Monhegan's economy. From October 1 through June, fishermen harvest lobsters from the only lobster conservation area in the state of Maine.

Henry Trefethen was one of the original purchasers of Monhegan Island. The Trefethen House, the oldest house on Monhegan Island, served as a hotel for island visitors, and remains standing today.

=== Artist colony ===
The beginnings of the art colony on Monhegan date to the mid-19th century; by 1890, it was firmly established. Two of the early artists in residence from the 1890s, William Henry Singer (1868–1943) and Martin Borgord (1869–1935), left Monhegan to study at the Académie Julian in 1901. Among many early members who found inspiration on the island were summer visitors from the New York School of Art and the Pennsylvania Academy of the Fine Arts, such as Robert Henri, Frederick Judd Waugh, George Bellows, Edward Hopper and Rockwell Kent.

Later members of the artist colony have included Jay Hall Connaway, Abraham Bogdanove, Andrew Winter, Reuben Tam, Frances Kornbluth, Elena Jahn, Lynne Drexler, Edward Betts, and Jamie Wyeth. The 150-foot (50 m) northside cliffs at Blackhead have drawn the interest of Monhegan artists, including Kent, Hopper, and Kornbluth. The Monhegan Museum celebrated more the continuing draw of the island for artists in a 2014 exhibit entitled, "The Famous and the Forgotten: Revisiting Monhegan's Celebrated 1914 Art Exhibition."

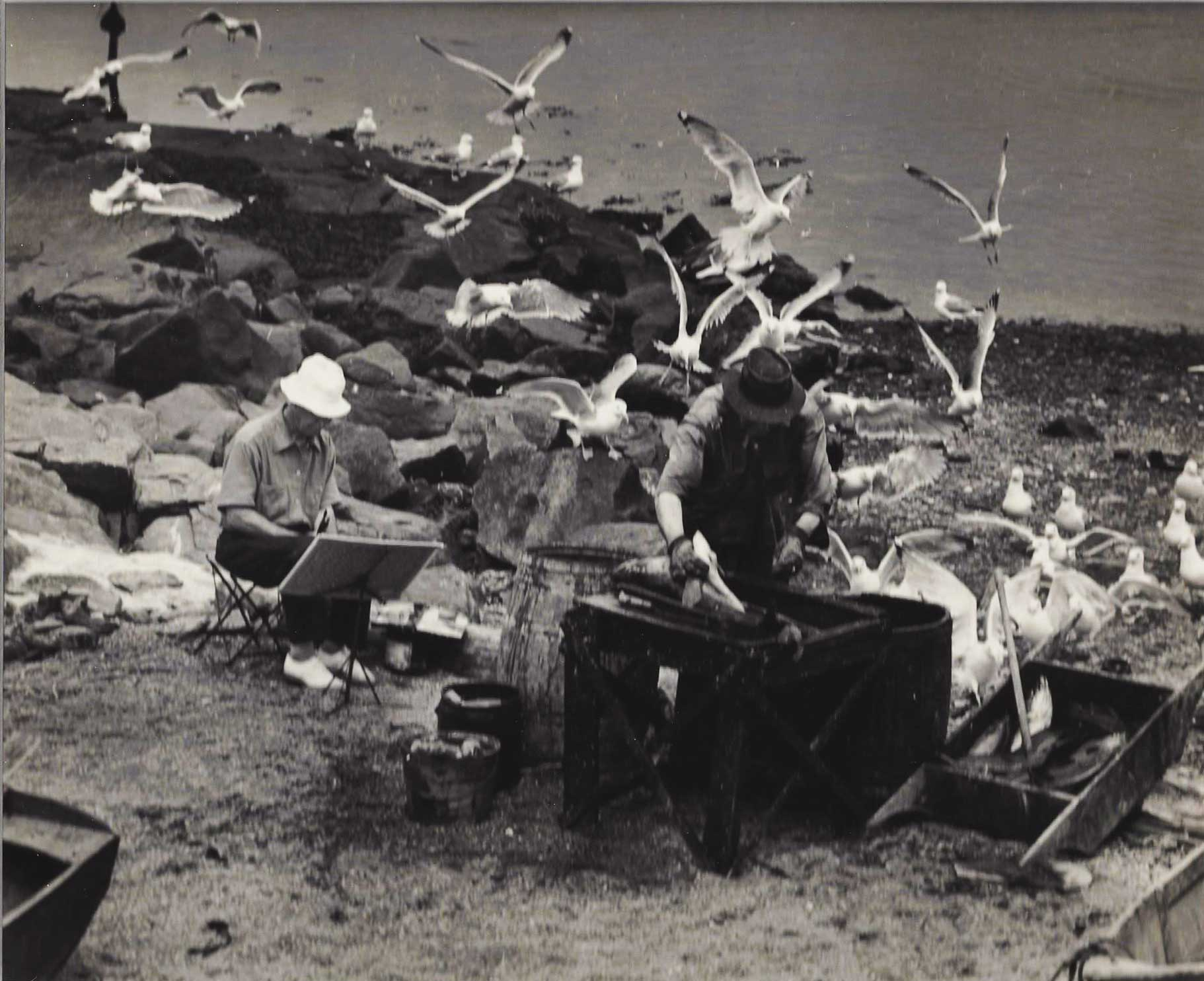
Artist painting fisherman en plein air at Fish Beach. Photo by Warner Taylor.

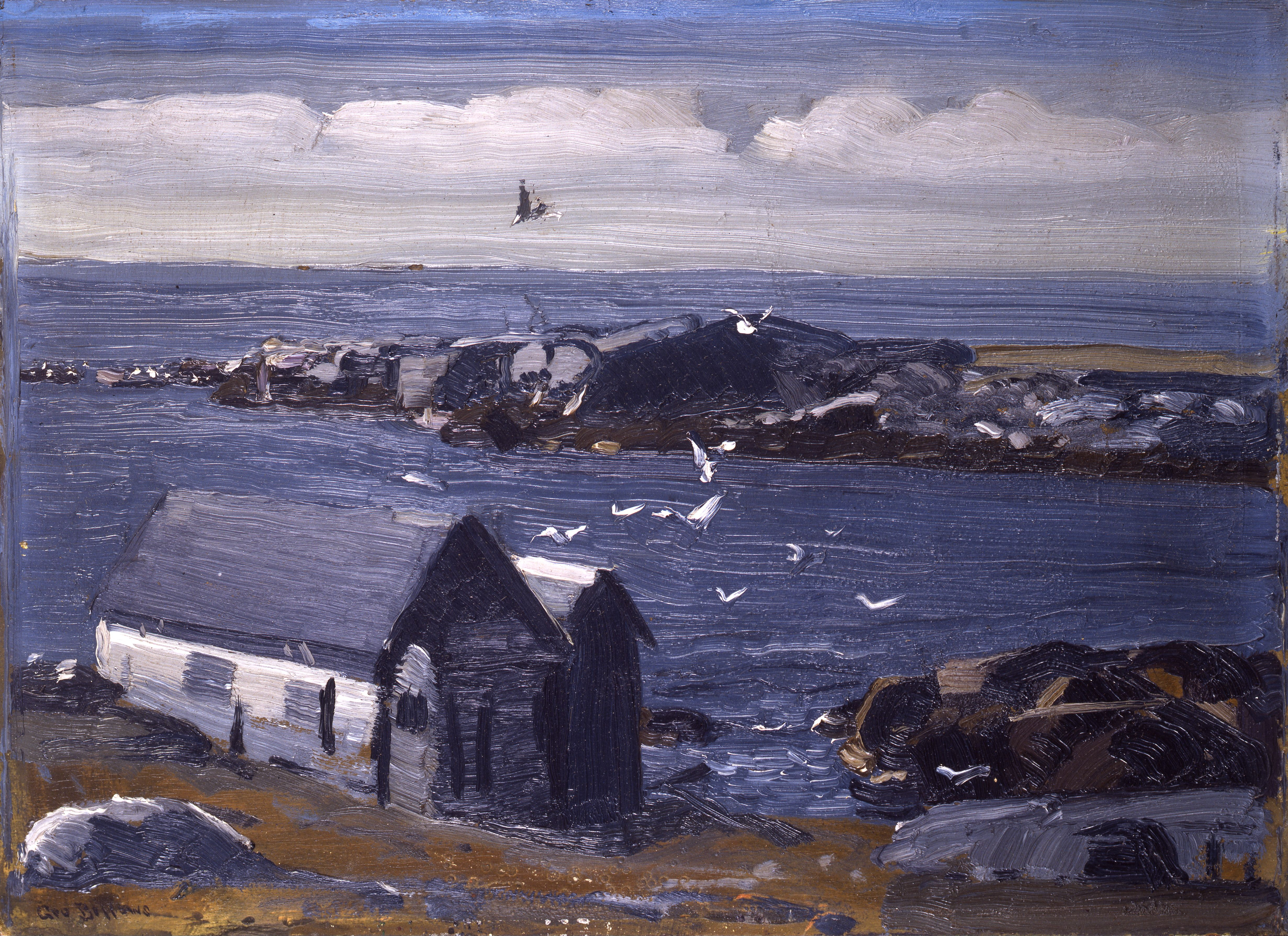
The Gulls, Monhegan by George Bellows

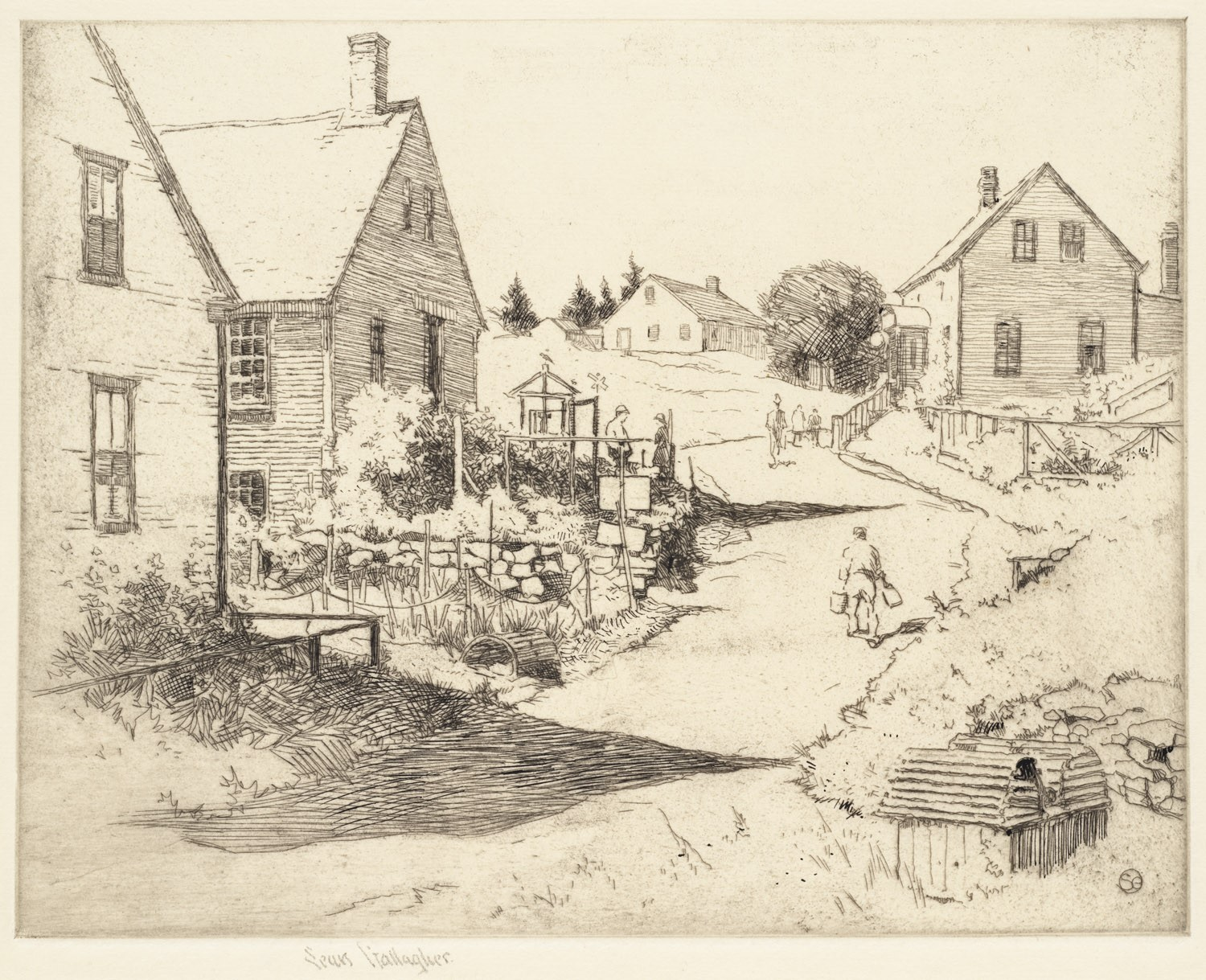
1940s view of the main track in town by Sears Gallagher

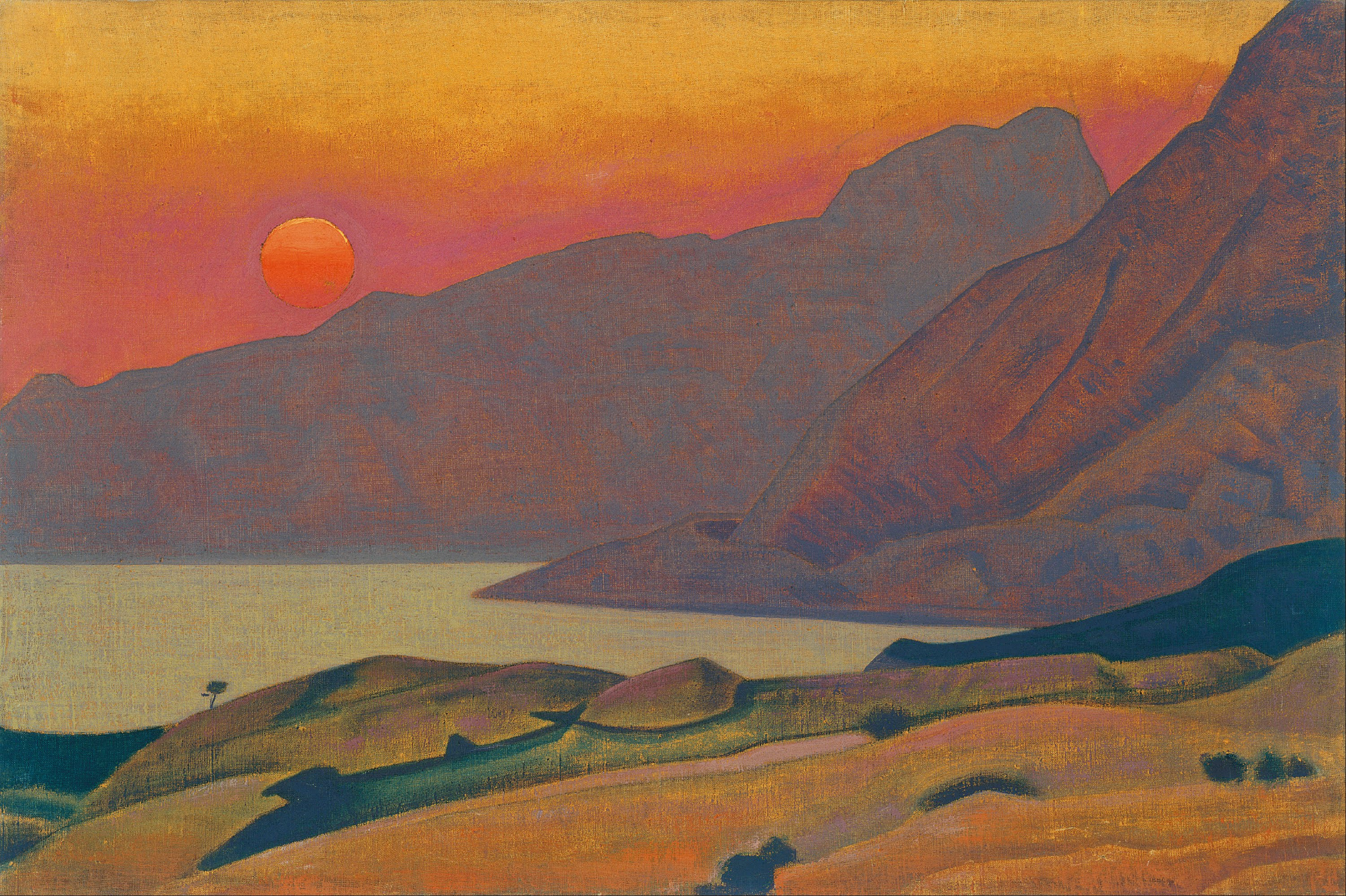
Monhegan. Maine (1922) by Nicholas Roerich (Google Art Project)

== Geography ==
According to the United States Census Bureau, the island has a total area of 4.5 square miles (12 km^{2}), of which 0.9 square miles (2.3 km^{2}) is land and 3.7 square miles (9.6 km^{2}) (80.97%) is water. Monhegan is an island 1.75 miles (2.82 km) long and .75 of a mile (1.2 kilometers) wide, located in the Gulf of Maine, part of the Atlantic Ocean. Adjacent Manana Island helps form Monhegan Harbor.

== Demographics ==
Historical population
Census	Pop.	Note	%±
1840	77		—
1850	197		155.8%
1860	195		−1.0%
1870	145		−25.6%
1880	133		−8.3%
1890	90		−32.3%
1900	94		4.4%
1910	120		27.7%
1920	133		10.8%
1930	109		−18.0%
1940	115		5.5%
1950	75		−34.8%
1960	65		−13.3%
1970	44		−32.3%
1980	109		147.7%
1990	88		−19.3%
2000	75		−14.8%
2010	69		−8.0%
2020	64		−7.2%
U.S. Decennial Census

As of the census of 2000, there were 75 people, 46 households, and 21 families residing in the plantation. The population density was 87.5 inhabitants per square mile (33.8/km^{2}). There were 177 housing units at an average density of 206.4 per square mile (79.7/km^{2}). The racial makeup of the plantation was 97.33% White and 2.67% Asian.

There were 46 households, out of which 13.0% had children under the age of 18 living with them, 32.6% were married couples living together, 4.3% had a female householder with no husband present, and 54.3% were non-families. Of all households 47.8% were made up of individuals, and 4.3% had someone living alone who was 65 years of age or older. The average household size was 1.63 and the average family size was 2.24.

In the plantation the population was spread out, with 10.7% under the age of 18, 8.0% from 18 to 24, 29.3% from 25 to 44, 37.3% from 45 to 64, and 14.7% who were 65 years of age or older. The median age was 48 years. For every 100 females, there were 127.3 males. For every 100 females age 18 and over, there were 116.1 males.

The median income for a household in the plantation was $26,250, and the median income for a family was $53,125. Males had a median income of $36,563 versus $13,333 for females. The per capita income for the plantation was $20,568. There were 10.5% of families and 3.8% of the population living below the poverty line, including 10.0% of under eighteens and none of those over 64.

== Sites of interest and outdoor activities ==
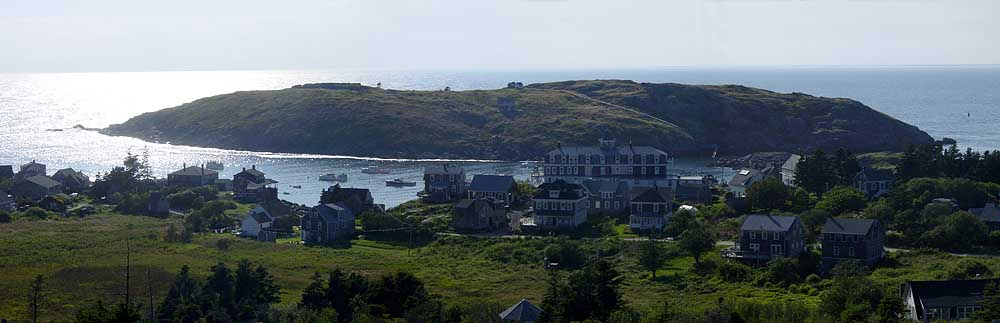
The village of Monhegan on Monhegan Island, with Manana Island in the background

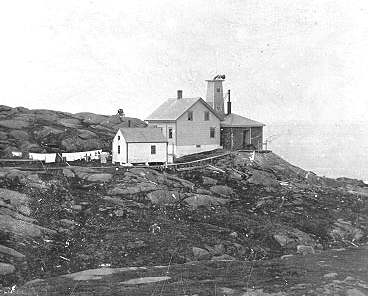
The former Coast Guard fog signal station on Manana Island, across a narrow passage from Monhegan

Summer months bring artists and tourists on several daily ferries. Visitors arrive at the ferry landing or on a beach in the village precinct. The village includes a church, private homes, hotels, art studios, private homes for rent and a few small stores, including one that sells fresh fish/lobster. Much of Monhegan is uninhabited and open for exploration on 17 miles (27 km) of hiking trails, which lead to high cliffs overlooking the sea. Inland paths lead through woods, including the Cathedral Woods. A tradition of building miniature "fairy houses" from found materials in Cathedral Woods and other areas has brought controversy, guidance and even destruction of non-compliant constructions.

The hill above the village is the site of the Monhegan Island Light, which offers a view of the village, the harbor, Manana Island, and across the sea to the west. Adjacent to the lighthouse is the Monhegan Museum, which is open middays from late June through September; the museum houses artifacts, reflecting the island's history.

The island is on the Atlantic flyway and is a stopover for migrating birds and the birdwatchers who come seasonally to observe them.

Monhegan's library was founded as the Jackie and Edward Library, named after two children who were lost to high waves on the island's shoreline, and specialized in children's literature. It became the Monhegan Memorial Library and broadened its literary selection.

== Education ==
In 2005, the Monhegan Island School had seven students, ages five through 12 (kindergarten through eighth grade), all taught by a single teacher; high-school students must attend school on the mainland. The schoolhouse reportedly also serves as a community center, which is site of the annual Christmas play and community dinner.

== Notable people ==
The following are people who have either resided on Monhegan or regularly visited the island:

- George Bellows, artist
- Abraham Bogdanove, artist
- Kate Chappell, artist, entrepreneur
- Tom Chappell, entrepreneur
- Jay Hall Connaway, artist
- Edward L. Deci, professor
- Lynne Drexler, artist
- Theodore Miller Edison, businessman
- Ernest Fiene, artist
- Sears Gallagher, artist
- Robert Henri, artist
- Edward Hopper, artist
- Elena Jahn, artist
- Rockwell Kent, artist
- Frances Kornbluth, artist
- Josh Mostel, actor
- Zero Mostel, actor
- Robert Mrazek, congressman from New York
- Edward Redfield, artist
- Samoset, Abenaki sagamore
- Sonya Sklaroff, artist
- Andrew Winter, artist
- Jamie Wyeth, artist

== Gallery ==
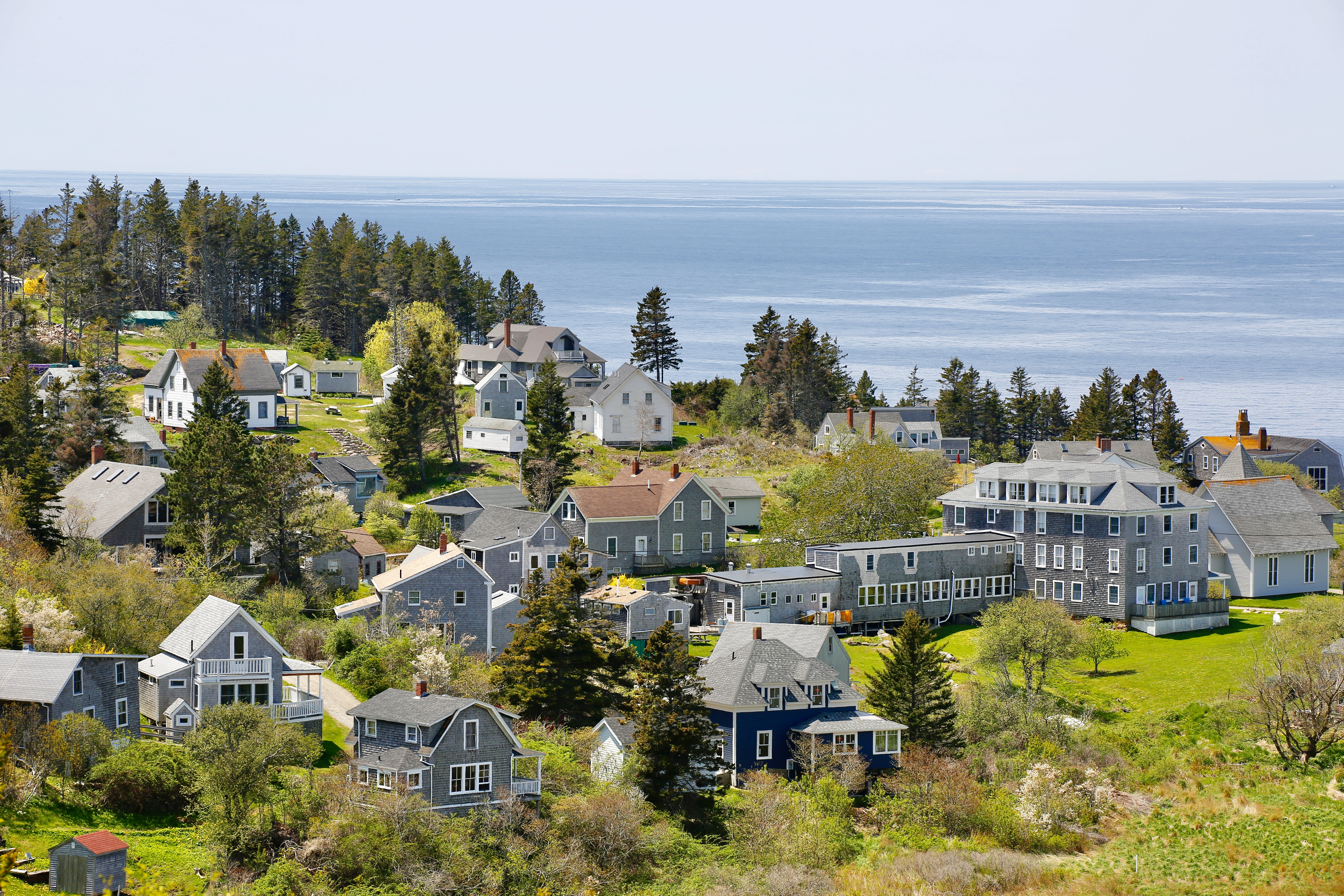
The village

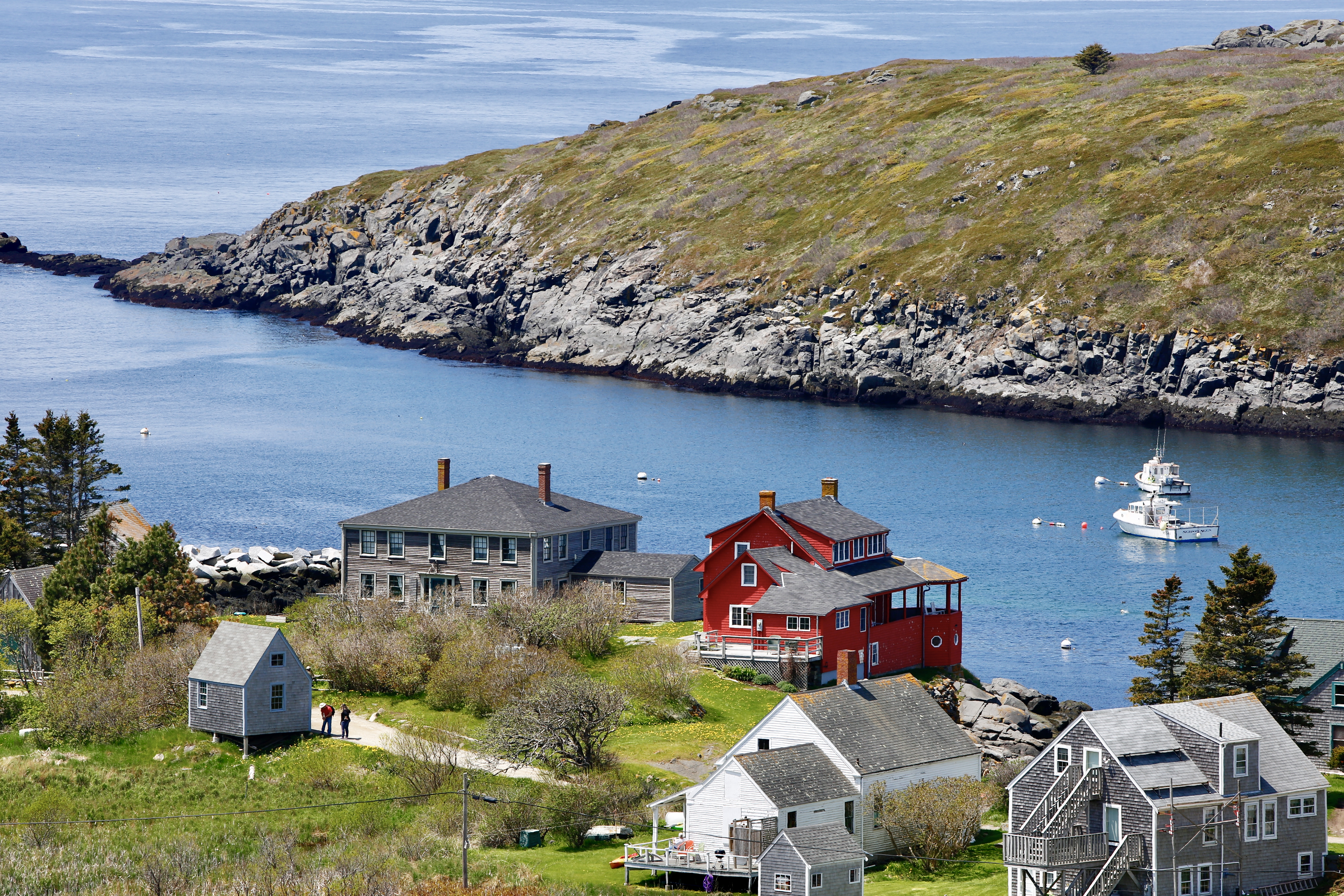
The harbor

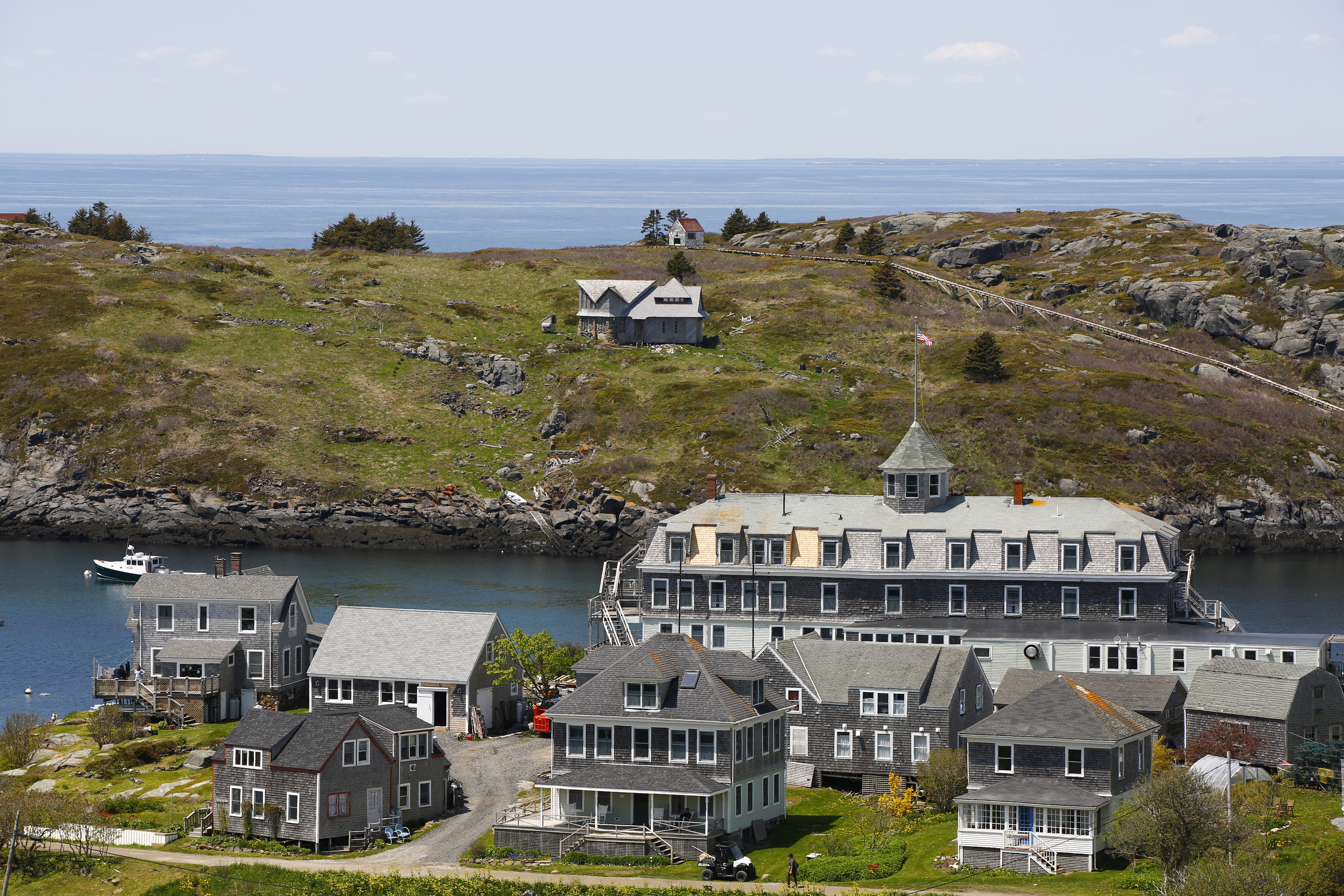
The Inn

== See also ==
- List of islands of Maine
- Rockwell Kent Cottage and Studio, also known as Kent-Fitzgerald Home
