= Kent House =

Kent House or variations including Kent Barn may refer to:

== In Canada ==
- Kent Cottage, also called Landfall or Freshwater, a historic dwelling in Brigus, Newfoundland

== In the United Kingdom ==
- Kent House railway station, railway station in Beckenham, south east London
- The London Studios, also called Kent House, a television studio complex owned by ITV plc
- Kent House, Hammersmith, a building in Hammersmith, London

== In the United States ==
- Jerry Kent House, Yuma, Arizona, listed on the NRHP in Yuma County
- Sydney Kent House, Chicago, Illinois, NRHP-listed in Cook County
- Kent House and Hitchens House, Williamsport, Indiana, listed on the NRHP in Warren County
- Kent Plantation House, in Alexandria, Louisiana, listed on the NRHP in Rapides Parish
- Charles Adolph Kent Sr. House, Kentwood, Louisiana, listed on the NRHP in Tangipahoa Parish
- Jonas Cutting-Edward Kent House, Bangor, Maine, listed on the NRHP in Penobscot County
- Rockwell Kent Cottage and Studio, Monhegen Plantation, Maine, listed on the NRHP in Lincoln County
- Reid-Kent House, Kalispell, Montana, listed on the NRHP in Flathead County
- Kent Dairy Round Barn, Red Lodge, Montana, NRHP-listed in Carbon County
- Moses-Kent House, Exeter, New Hampshire, NRHP-listed in Rockingham County
- Moses Kent House, Lyme, New Hampshire, NRHP-listed in Grafton County
- Kent-Delord House, Plattsburgh, New York, NRHP-listed in Clinton County
- Zeno Kent House, Aurora, Ohio, listed on the NRHP in Portage County
- J. Kent Residence, Bath, Ohio, NRHP-listed in Summit County
- Charles Kent House, Kent, Ohio, NRHP-listed in Portage County
- Thomas Kent Jr. Farm, Waynersburg, Pennsylvania, NRHP-listed in Greene County
- Kent-Valentine House, Richmond, Virginia, NRHP-listed
- Boynton-Kent House, Lufkin, Texas, listed on the NRHP in Angelina County

== In fiction ==
- The home of Jonathan and Martha Kent, fictional foster parents of Clark Kent/Superman
