= Kent Plantation House =

Historic house in Louisiana, United States

- U.S. National Register of Historic Places
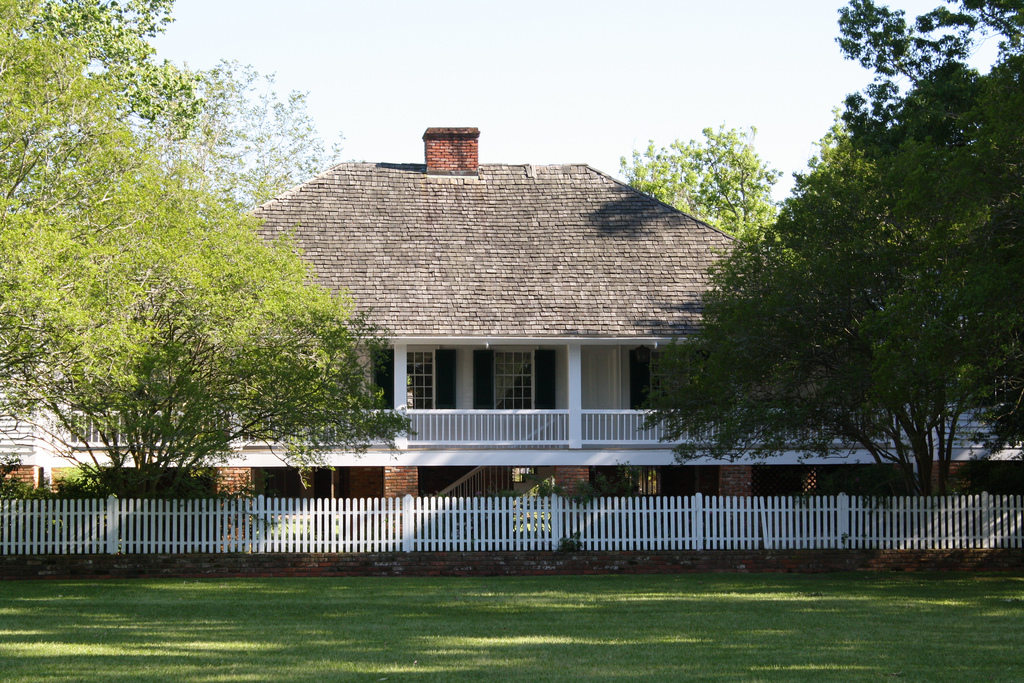

- Location within Louisiana Location within the United States
- Location: 3601 Bayou Rapides Road; Alexandria, Louisiana
- Coordinates: 31°18′22″N 92°29′01″W
- Area: 4 acres (1.6 ha)
- Built: 1800
- Architect: Pierre Baillio II
- Architectural style: Greek Revival, Creole architecture
- NRHP reference No.: 71000362
- Added to NRHP: August 5, 1971

Kent Plantation House is the oldest standing structure in Central Louisiana. Listed since 1971 in the National Register of Historic Places, Kent House is located in Alexandria in Rapides Parish. The plantation house is a representation of southern plantation life between 1795 and 1855. The bousillage Creole house and restored period outbuildings are now a showcase for tourists.

== History ==
Kent Plantation House displays original artifacts from people who worked and lived at the house during its operation.

=== Buildings ===
H. Parrott Bacot, former director of the Anglo-American Art Museum at Louisiana State University in Baton Rouge, Louisiana, led the interior restoration.

The several outbuildings surrounding the main structure are furnished with Federal, Sheraton, and Empire pieces.

The Milk House was built between 1820 and 1830; dairy products, such as cheese, milk, and butter, were prepared and stored there. The Blacksmith Shop was constructed about 1815. The Kitchen contains an open hearth fireplace for cooking.

=== Marker text ===
The marker at the front entrance of the Kent Plantation House reads:

Kent House, the oldest known standing structure in Rapides Parish, was built by Pierre Baillio, completed in 1800. Baillio constructed the house on land received through a Spanish land grant circa 1794.

== Gallery ==
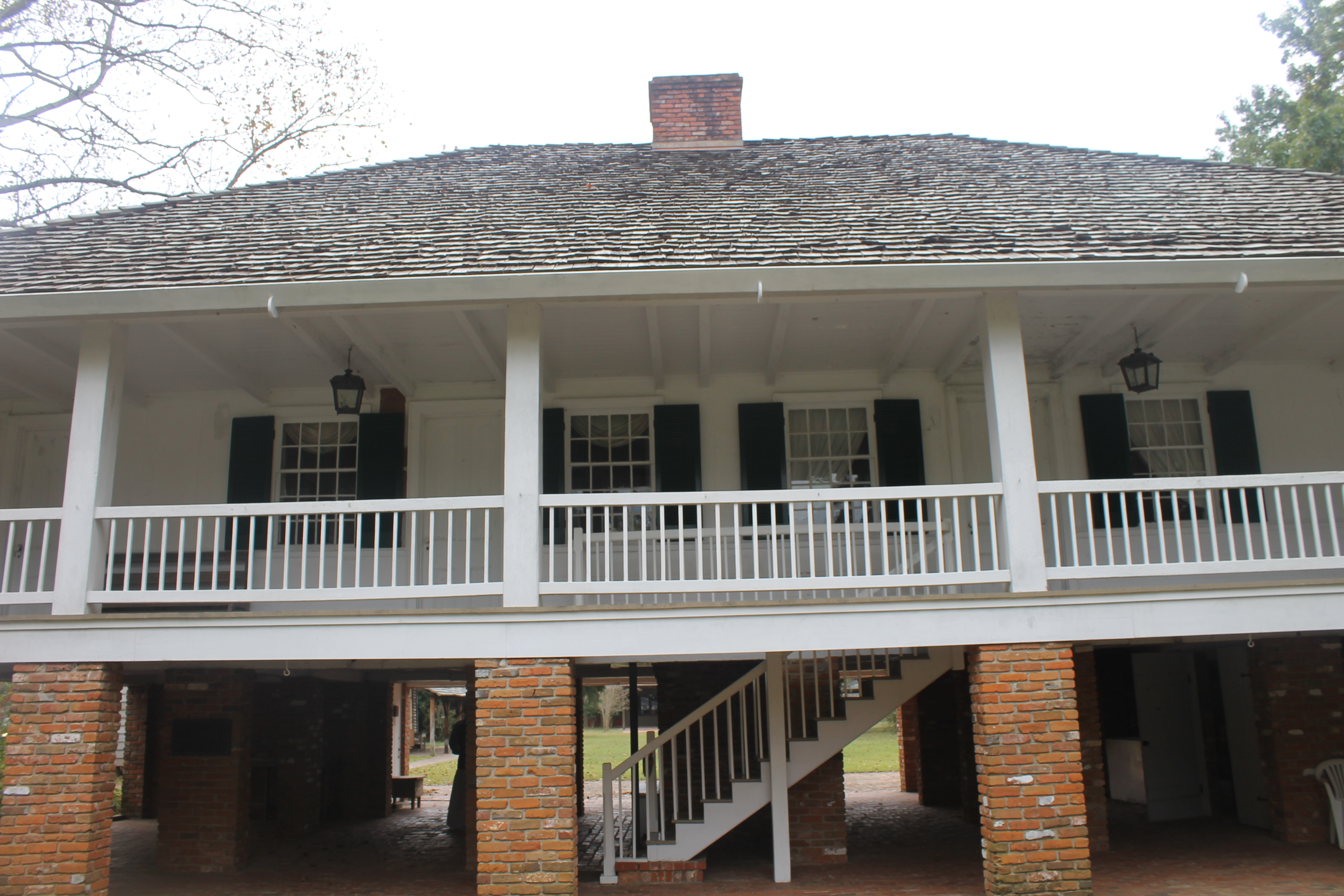
Close-up of the plantation house

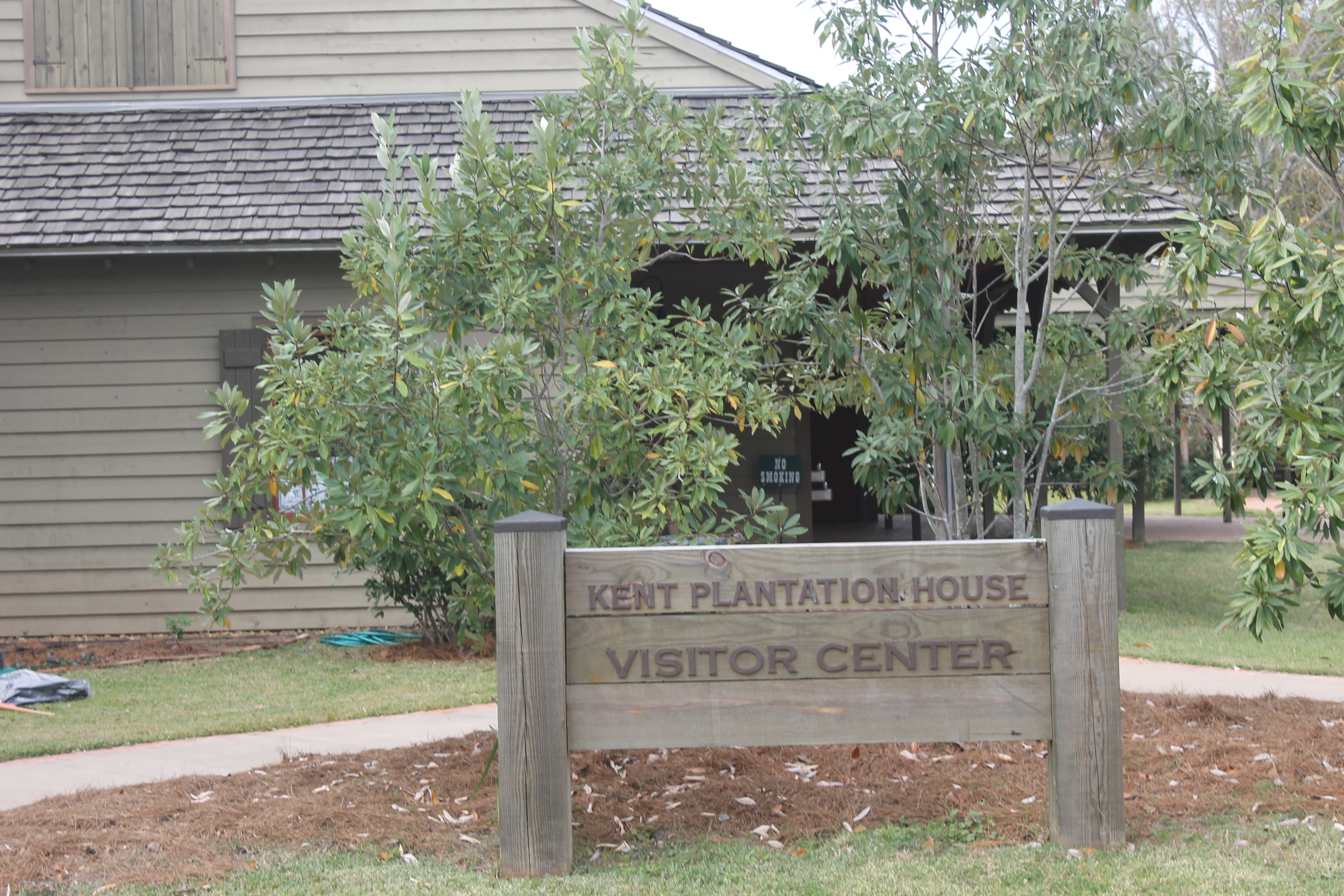
Visitor Center

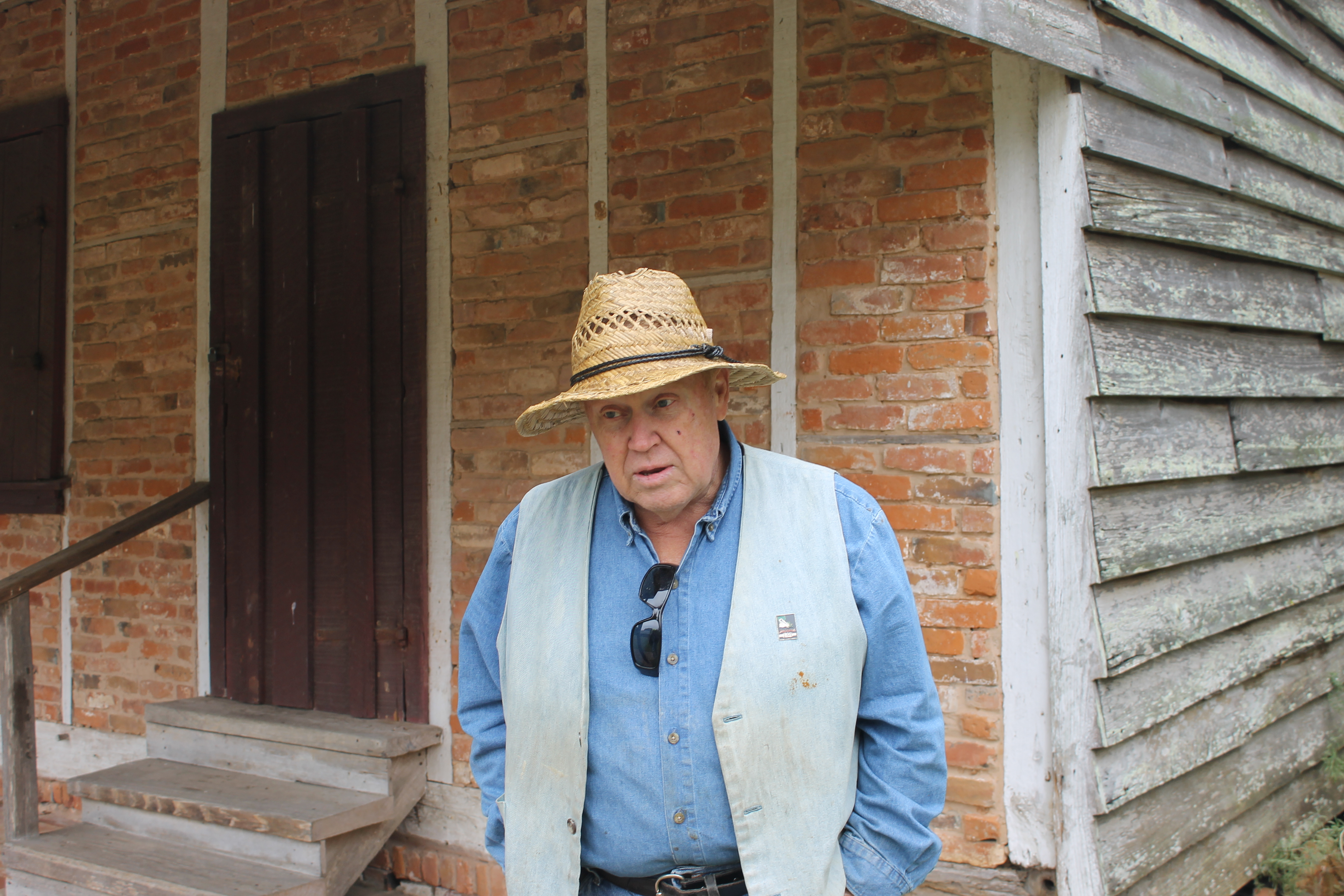
Outdoor tour guide at Kent House

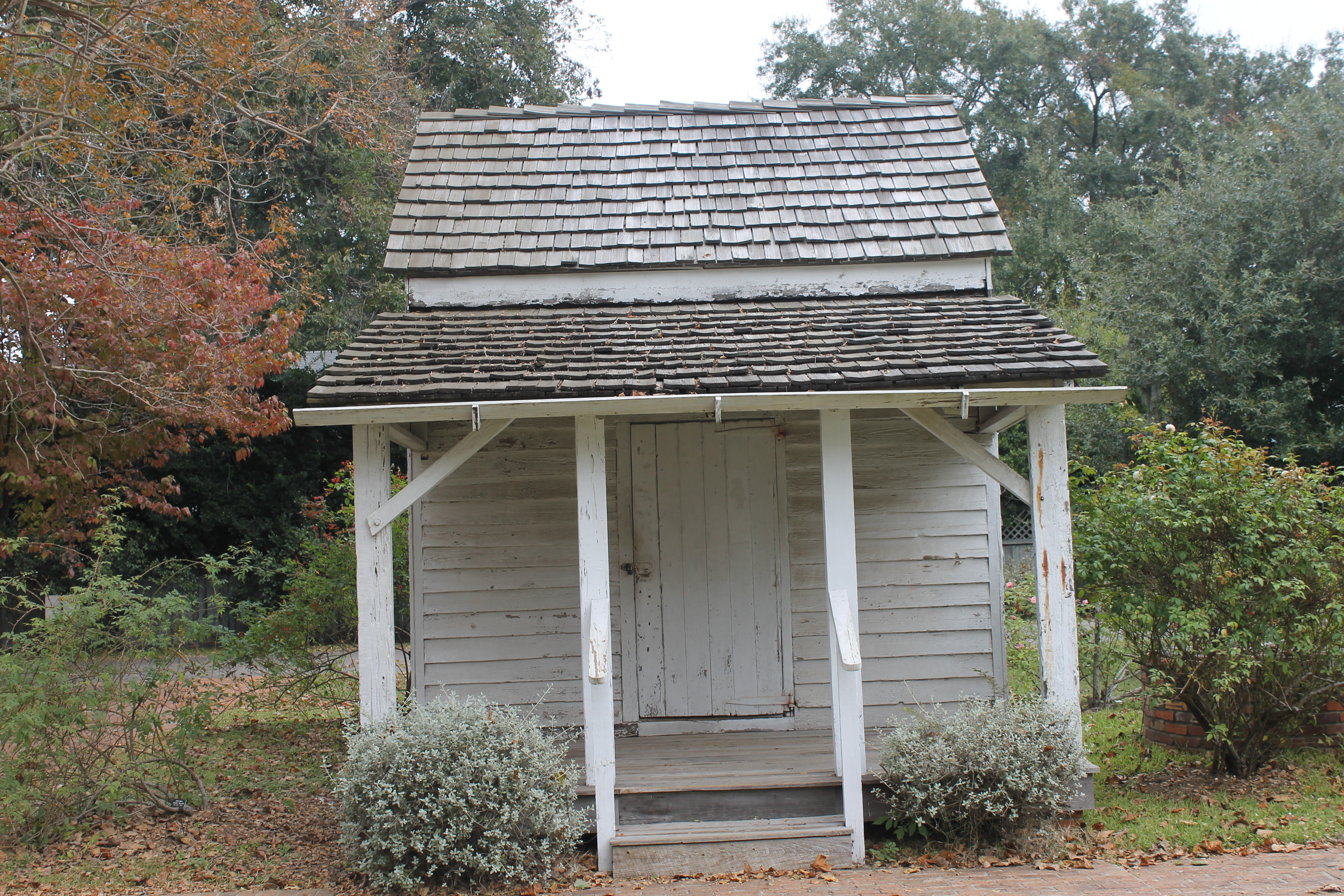
Milk House (constructed prior to 1830)

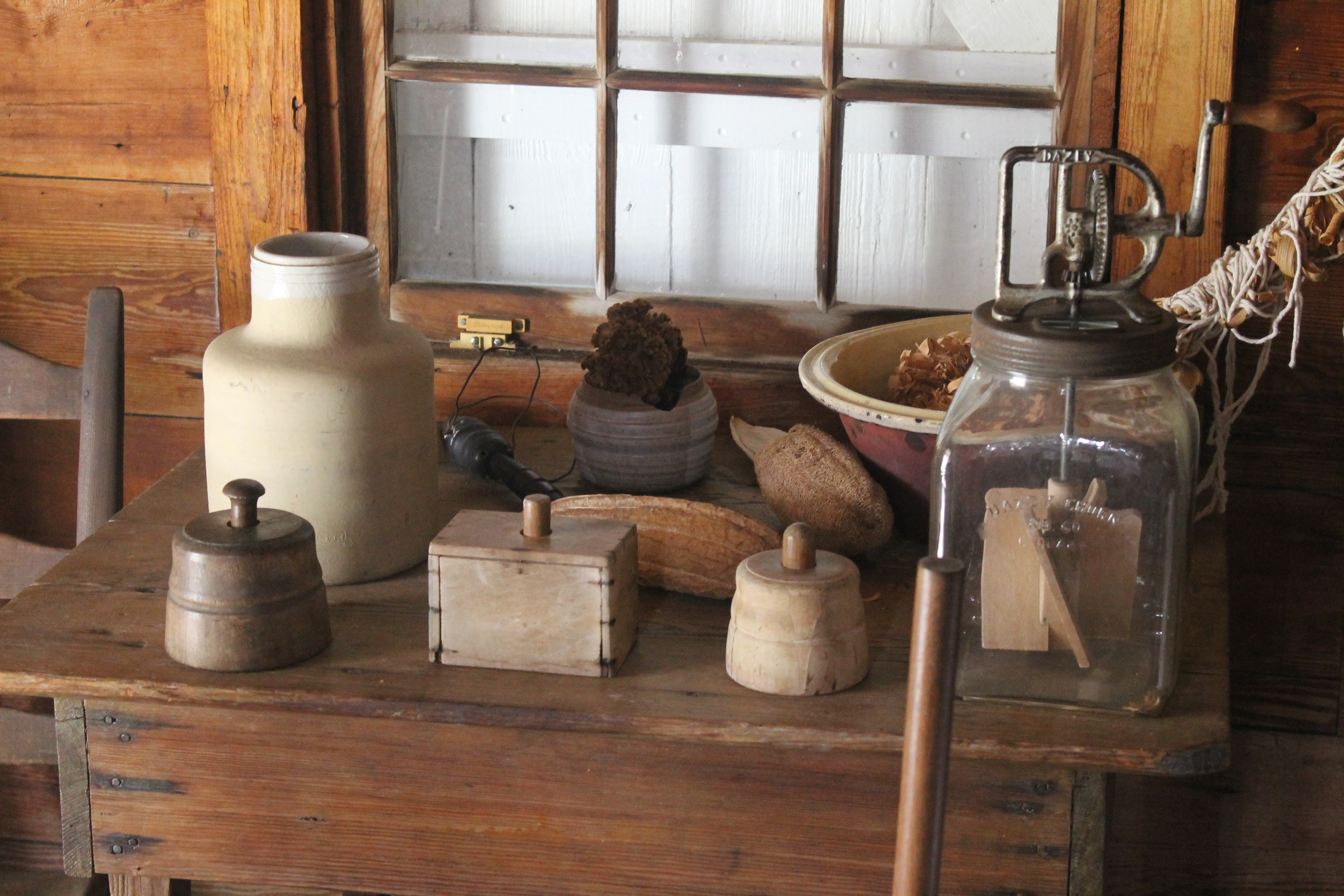
Various utensils inside the Milk House

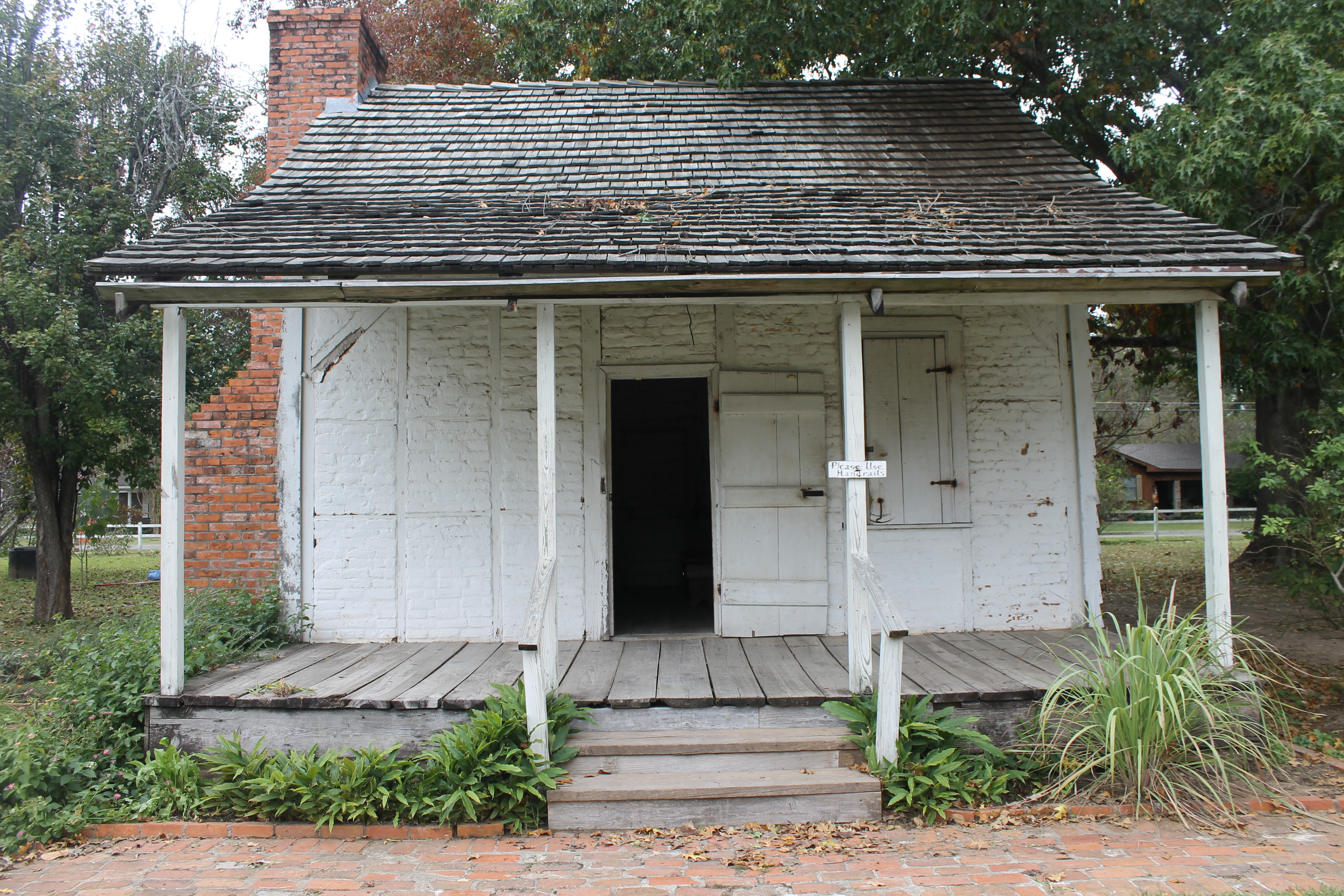
Kitchen

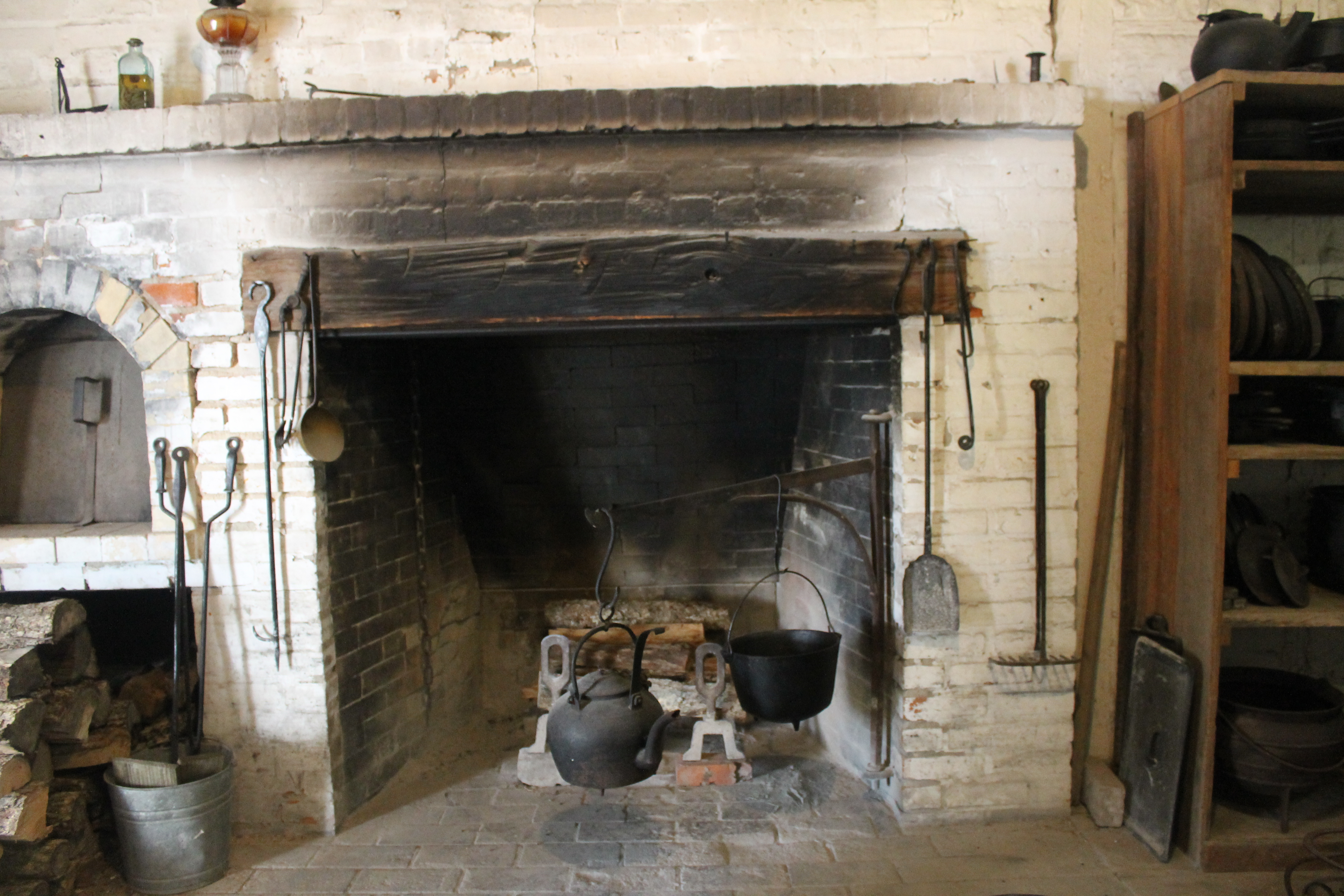
Open-hearth cooking on the plantation; still done on a weekly basis by the Kent House staff

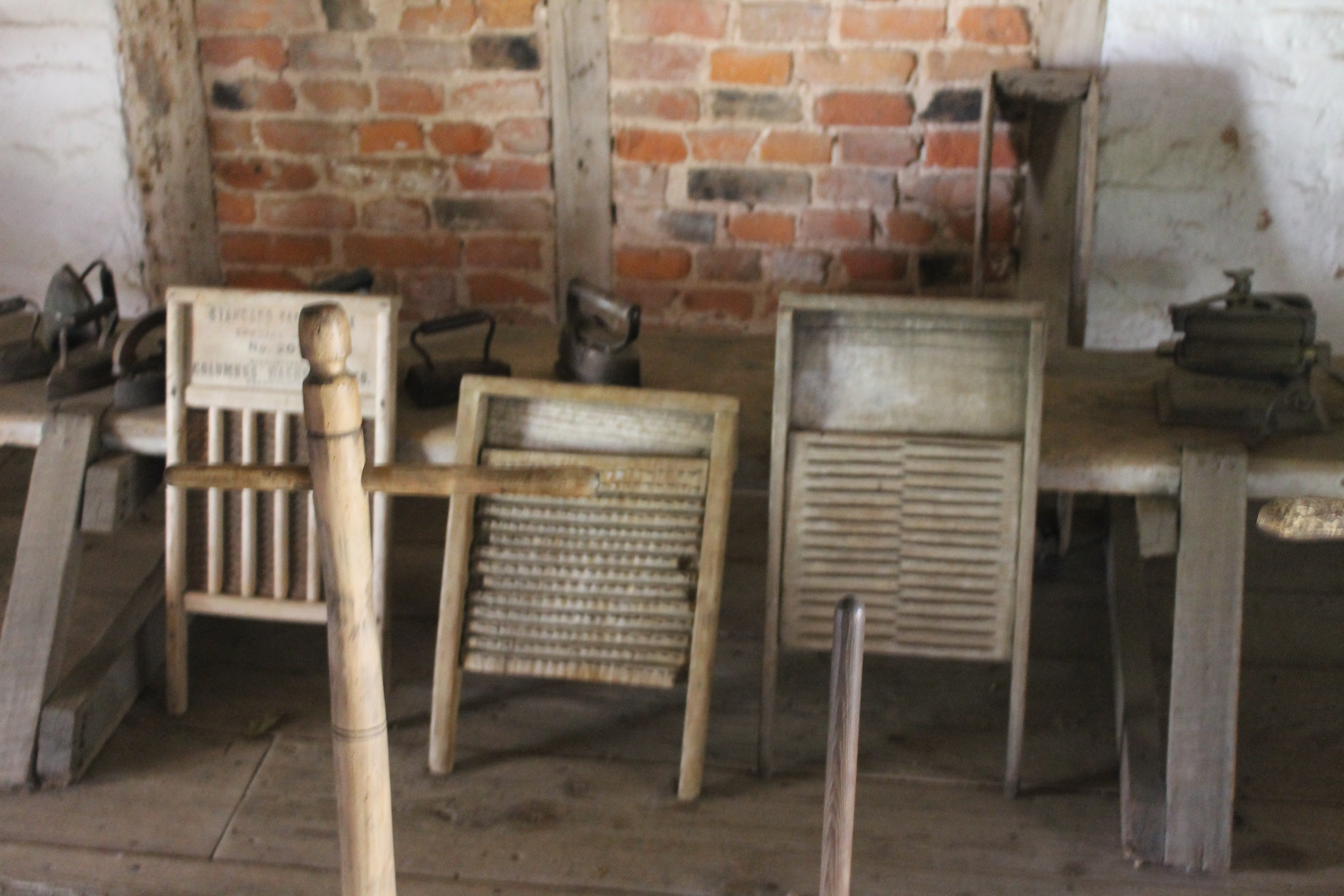
Laundry room

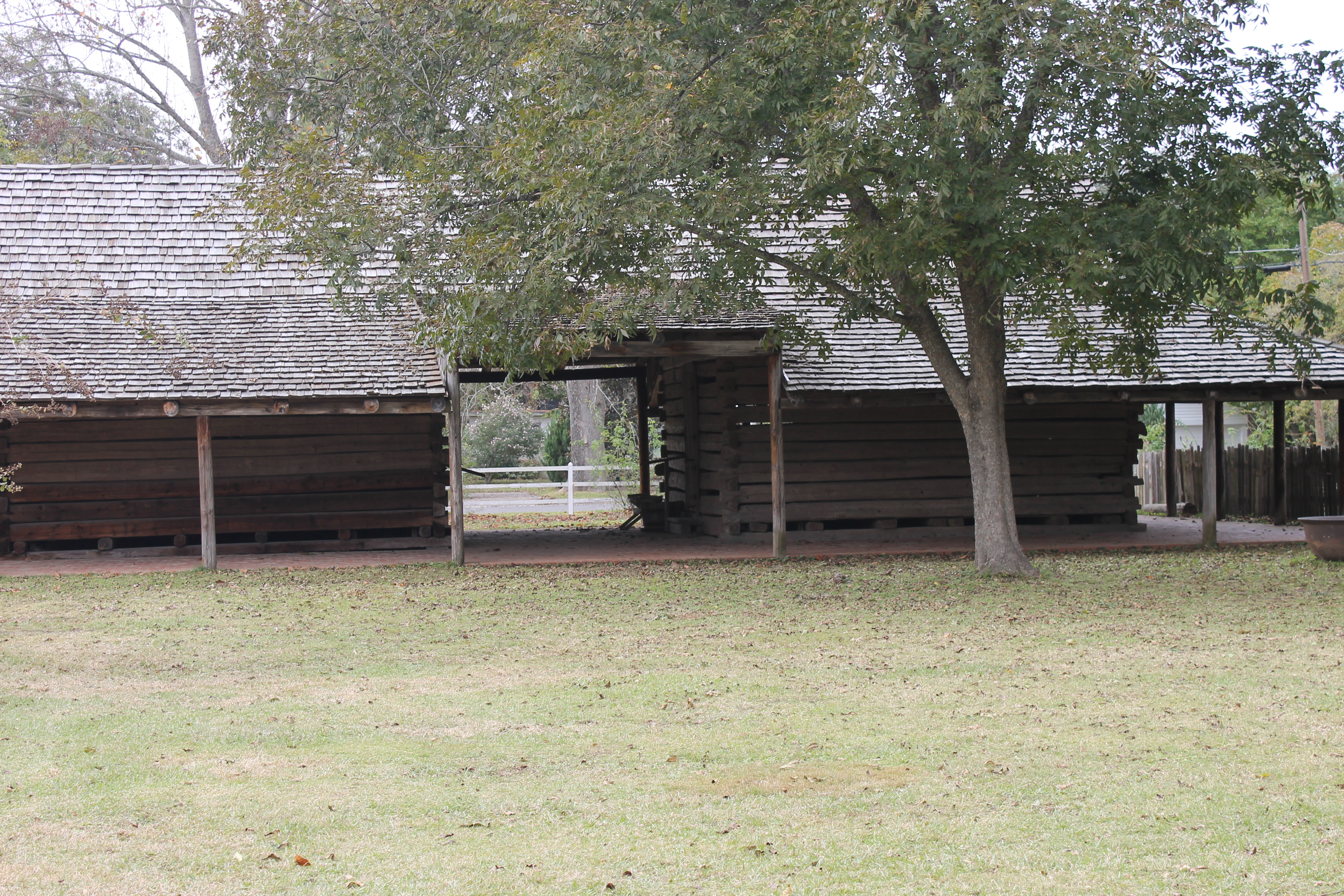
Barn at Kent House

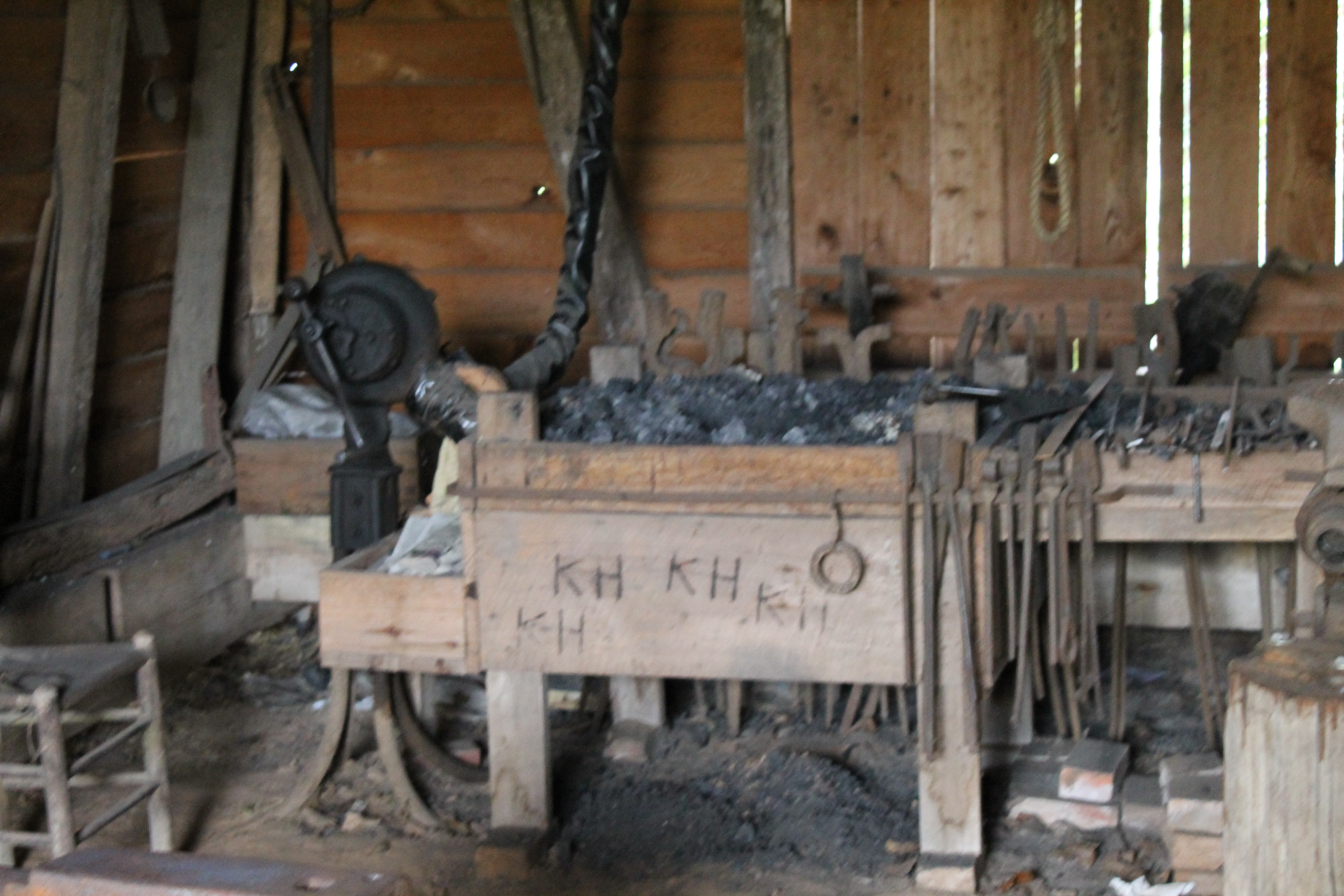
Blacksmith shop

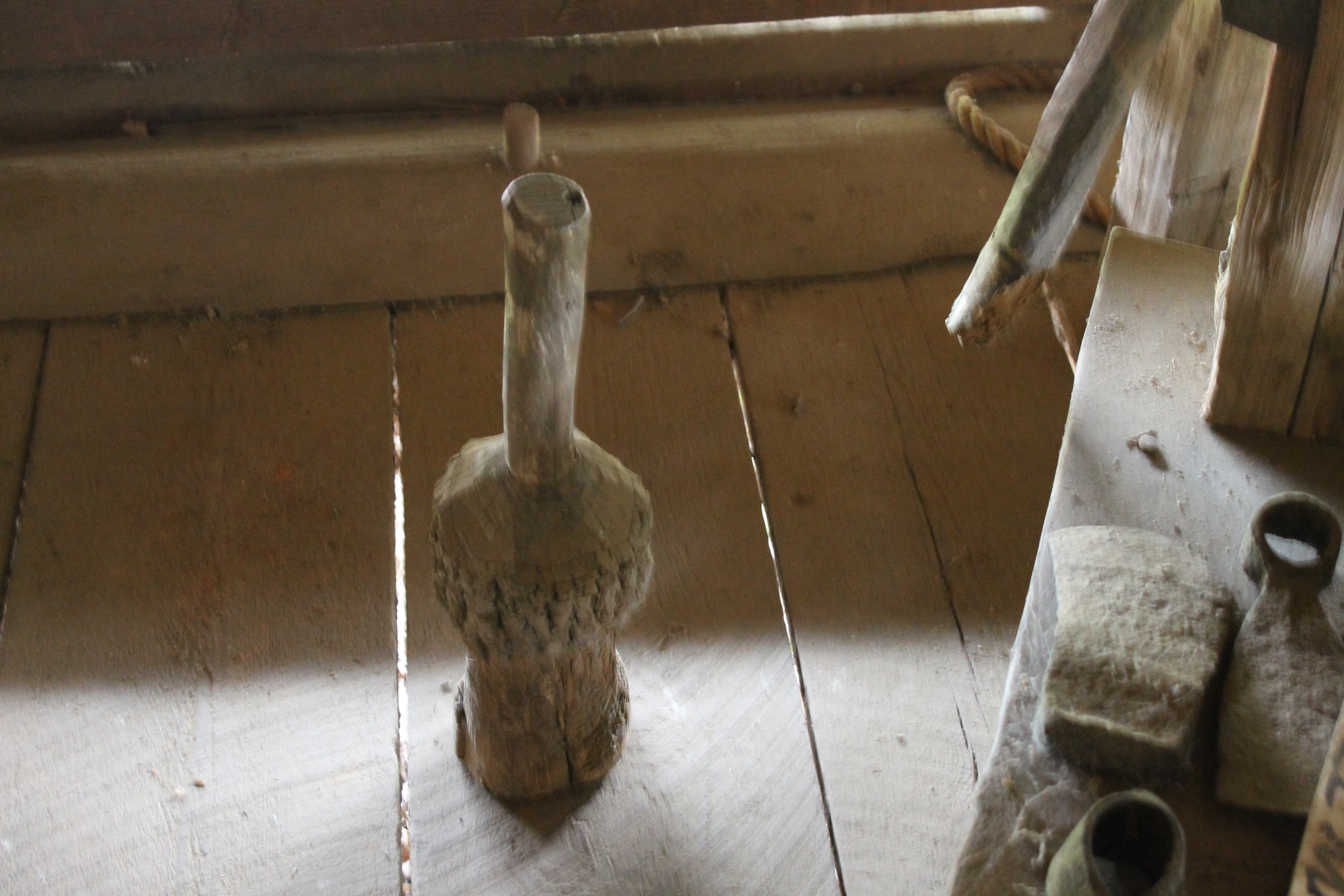
A wooden hammer

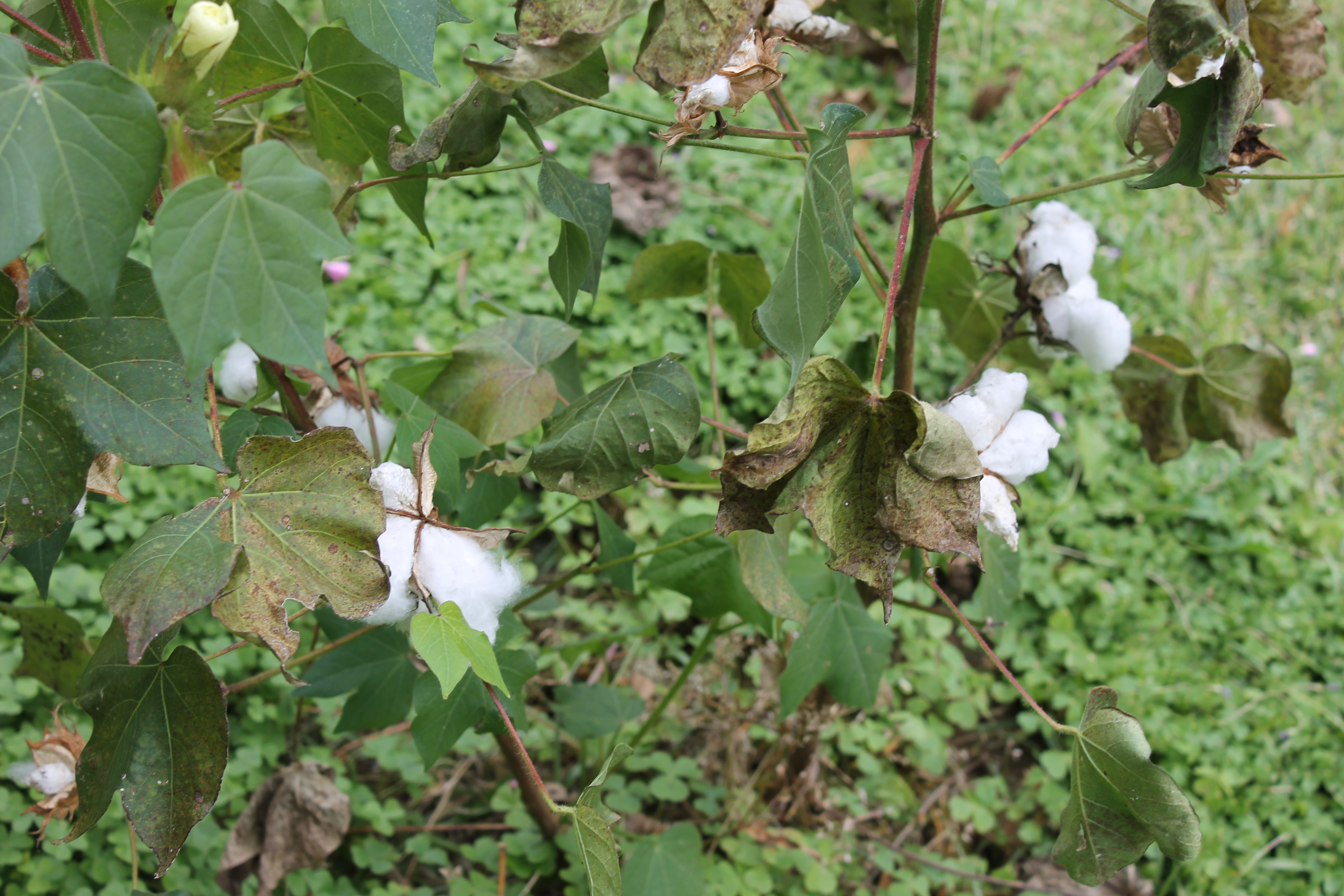
Cotton stalks at Kent House

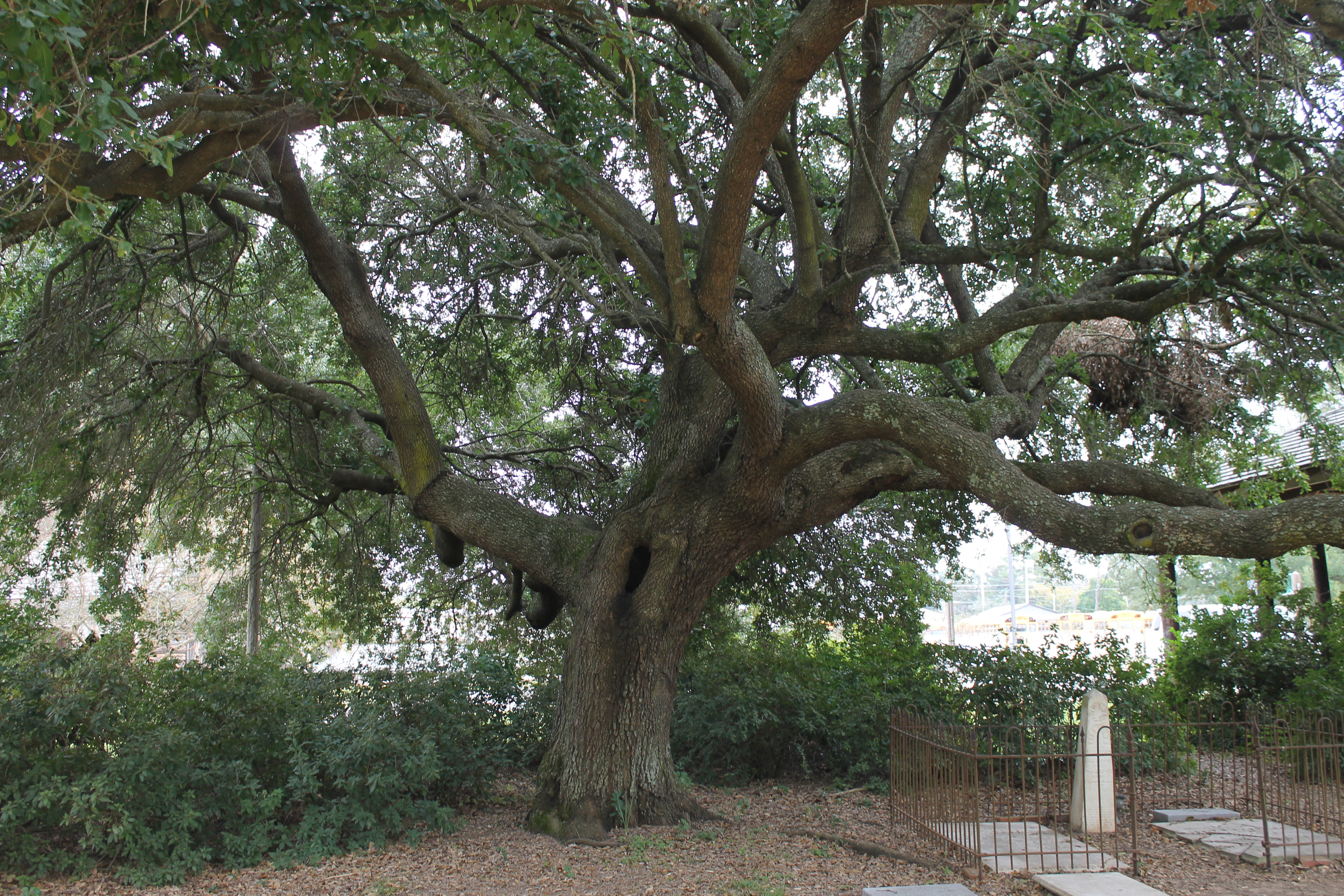
Towering oak tree at Kent House

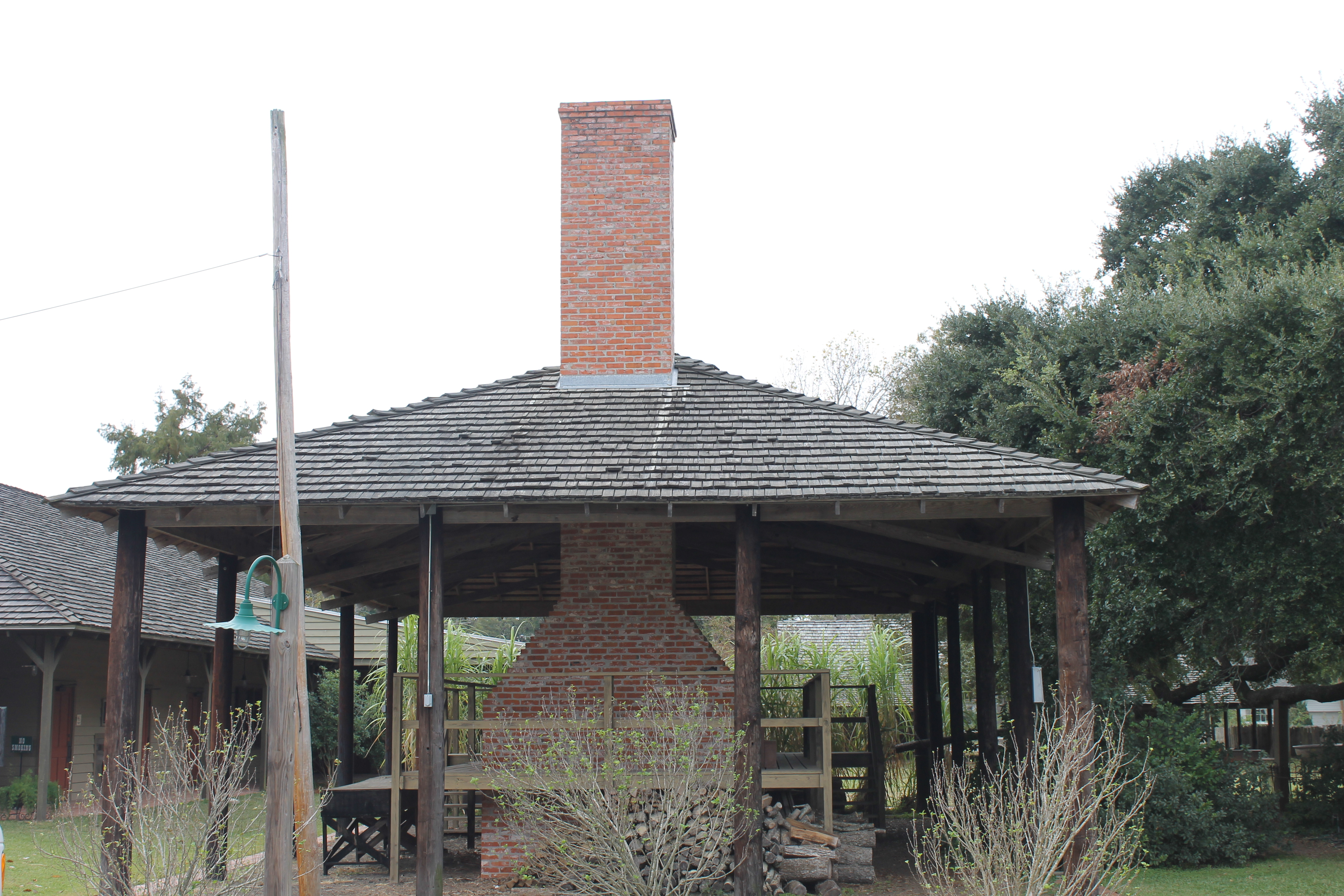
The center for the making of cane syrup at Kent House

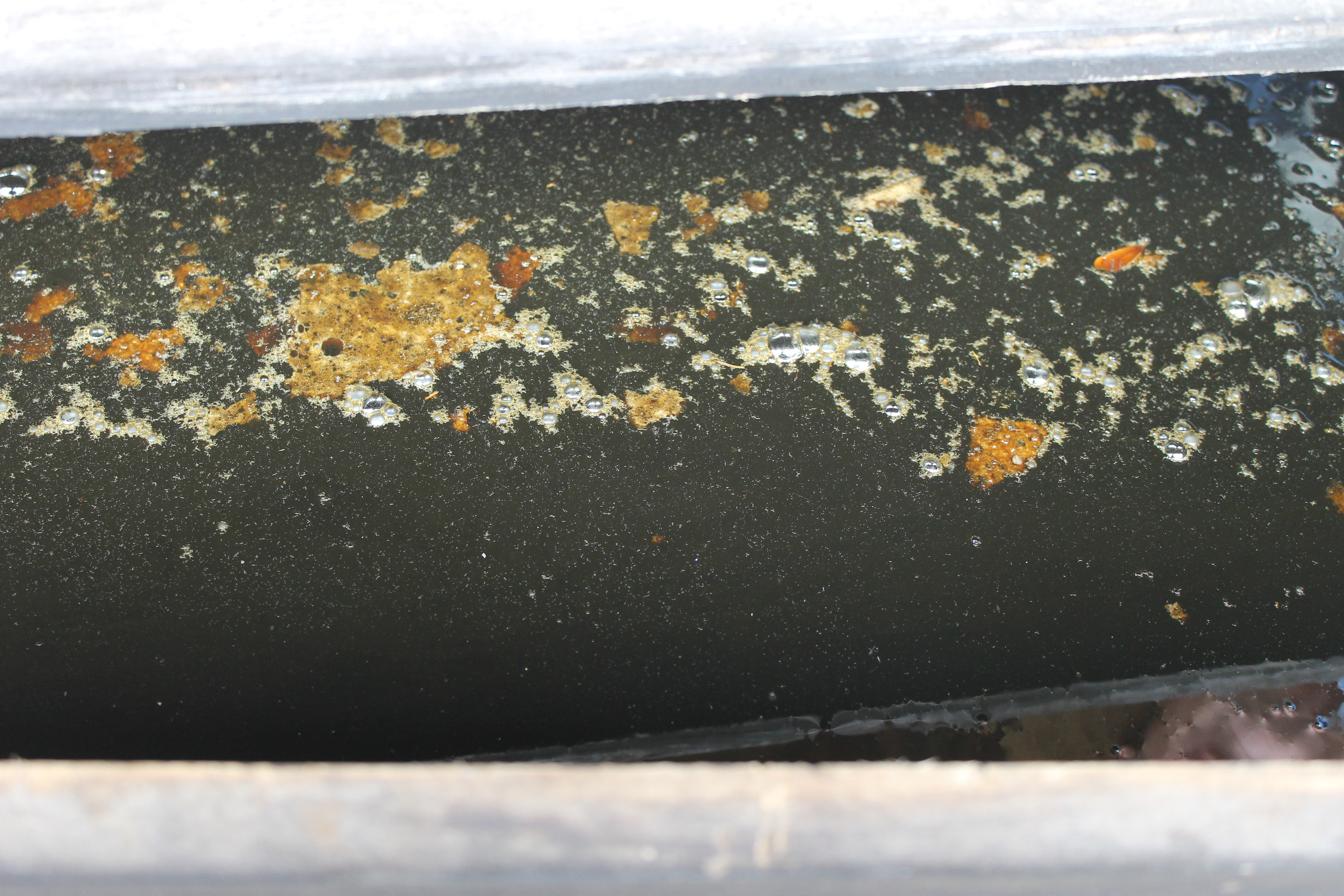
Cane syrup in trough is ready for use.

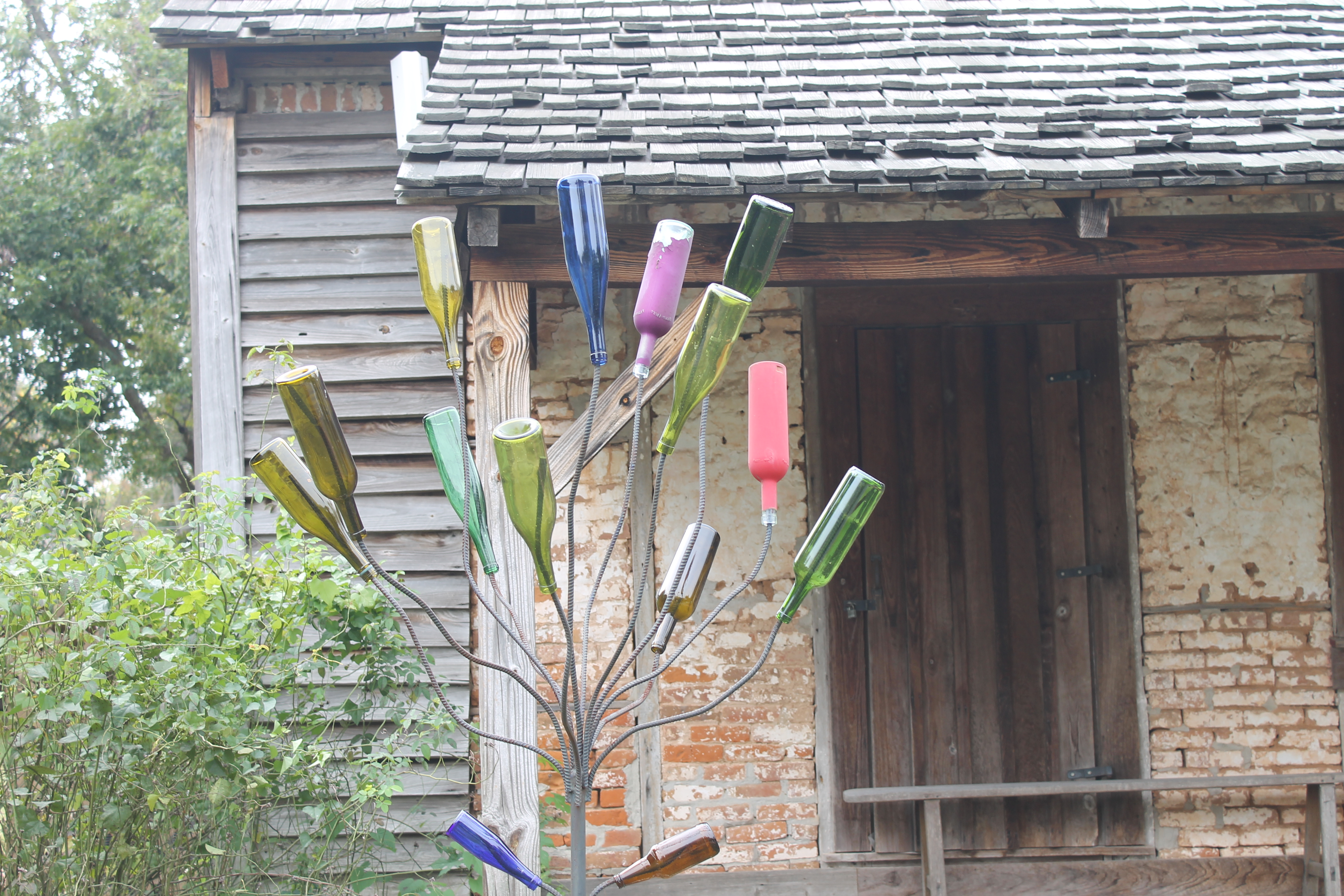
Bottle tree, according to southern tradition, would ward off evil spirits.

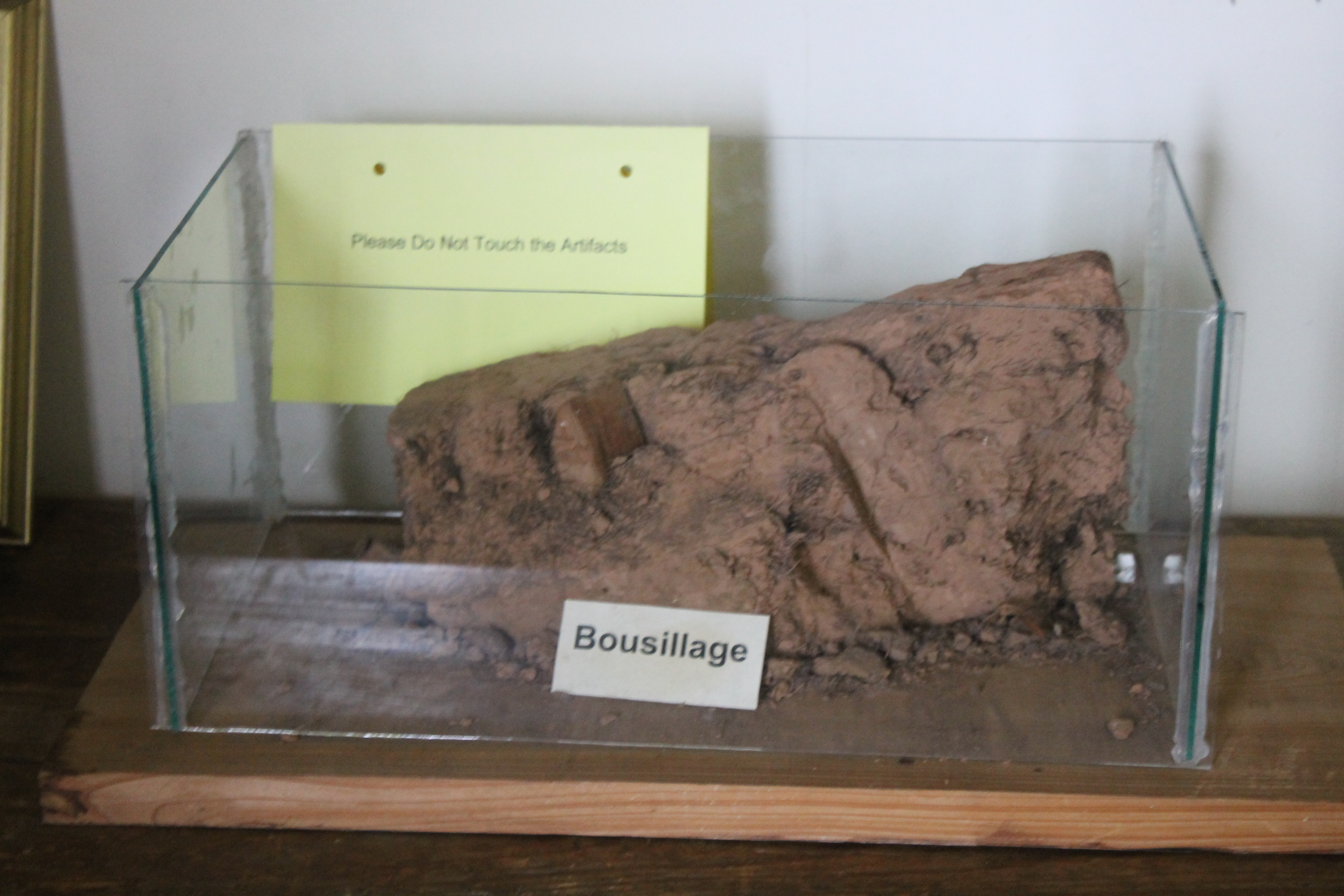
Bousillage, a mixture of clay and grass, is a key building material of Kent House.

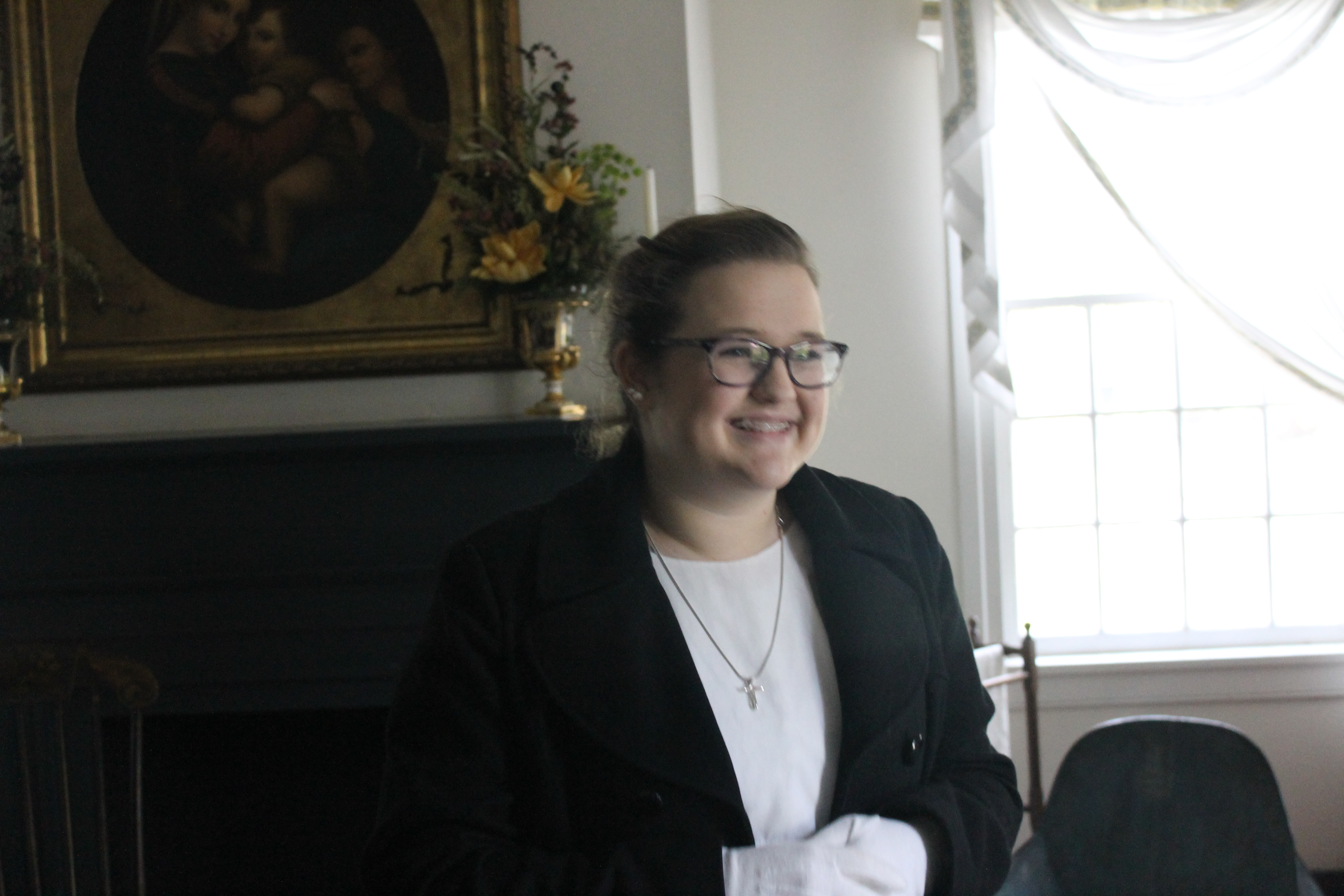
Indoor tour guide at Kent House

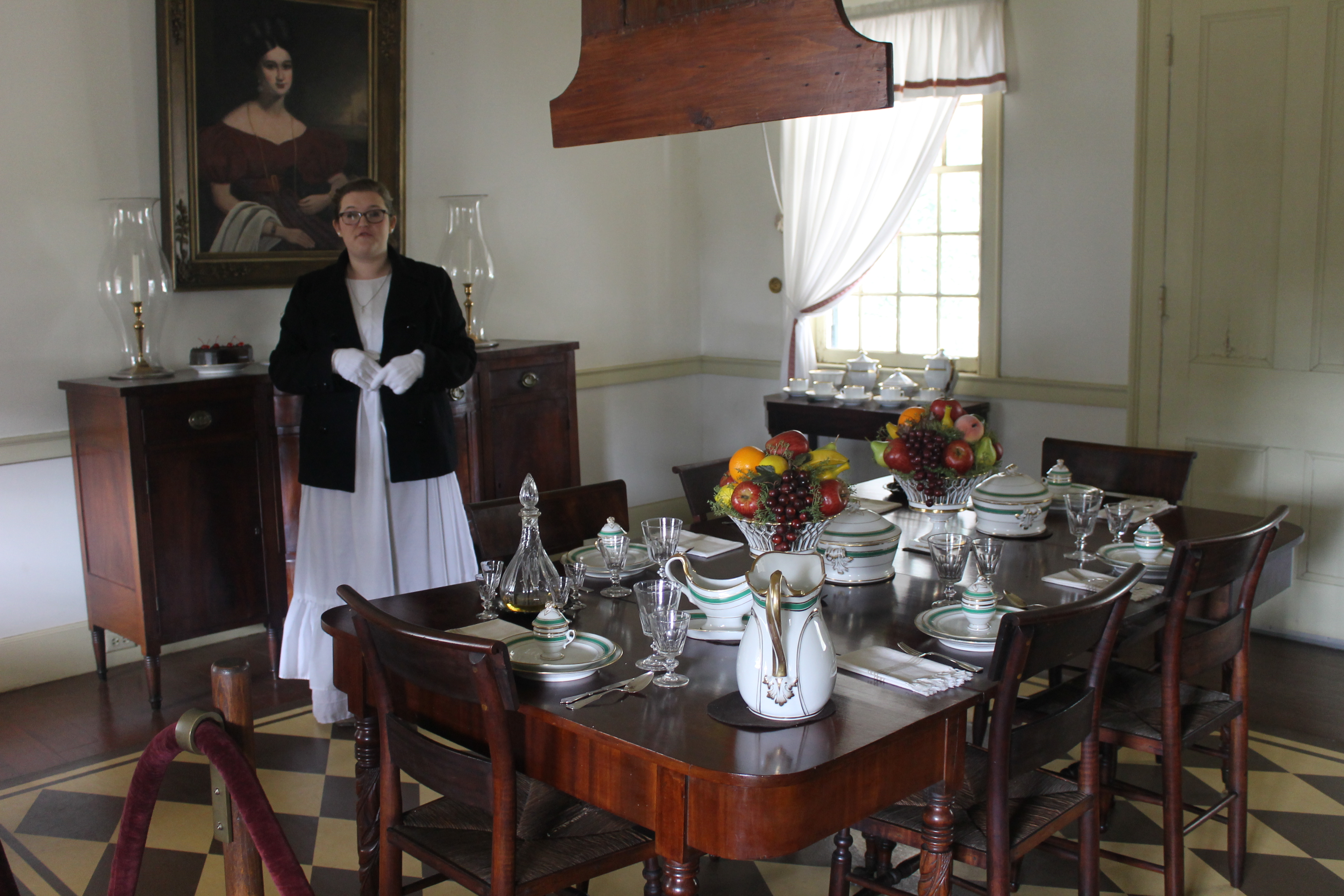
Dining table; the wooden fan from the ceiling was attached to a rope and powered by servants for cooling the room.

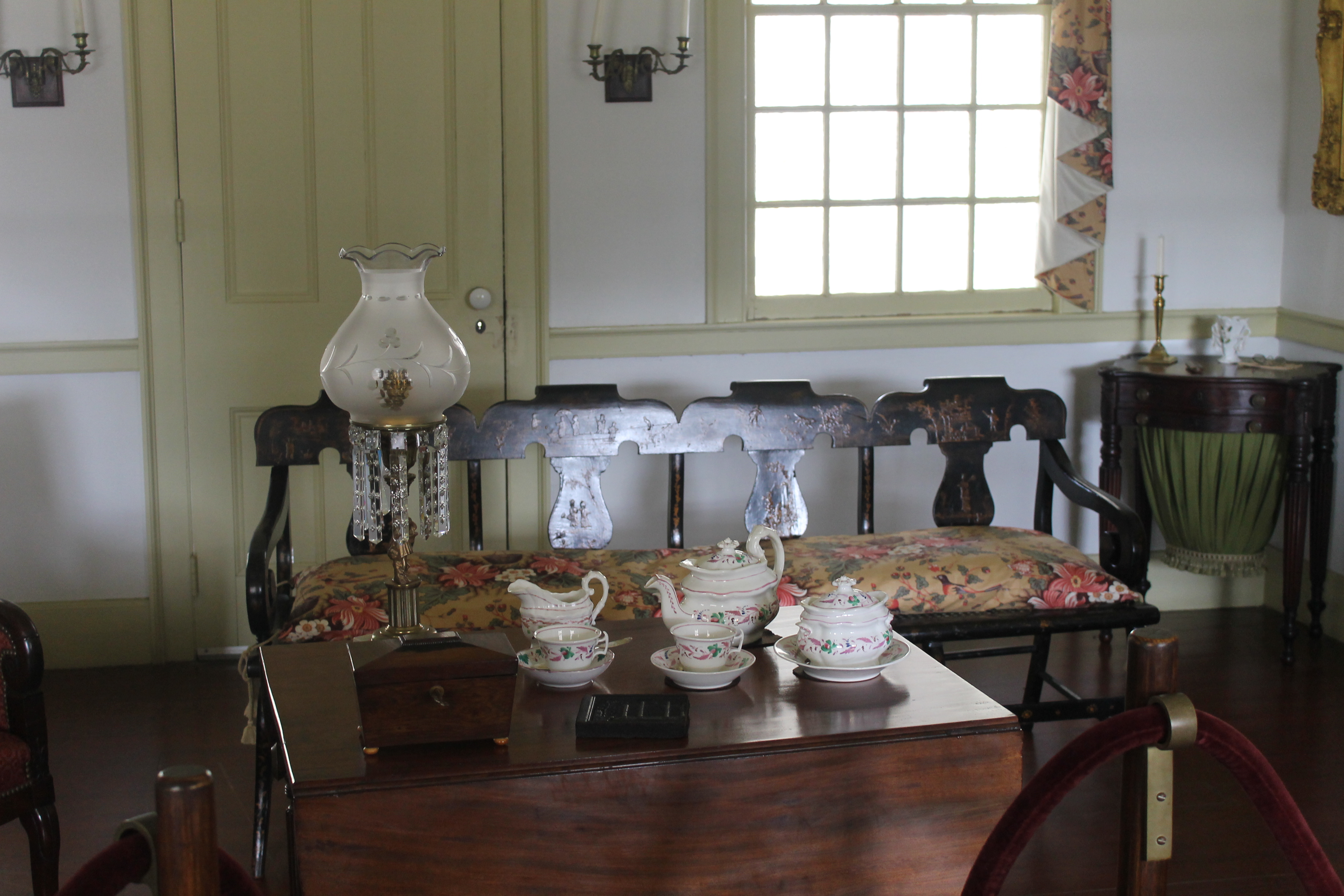
Parlor, where tea, an expensive item in that day, was served

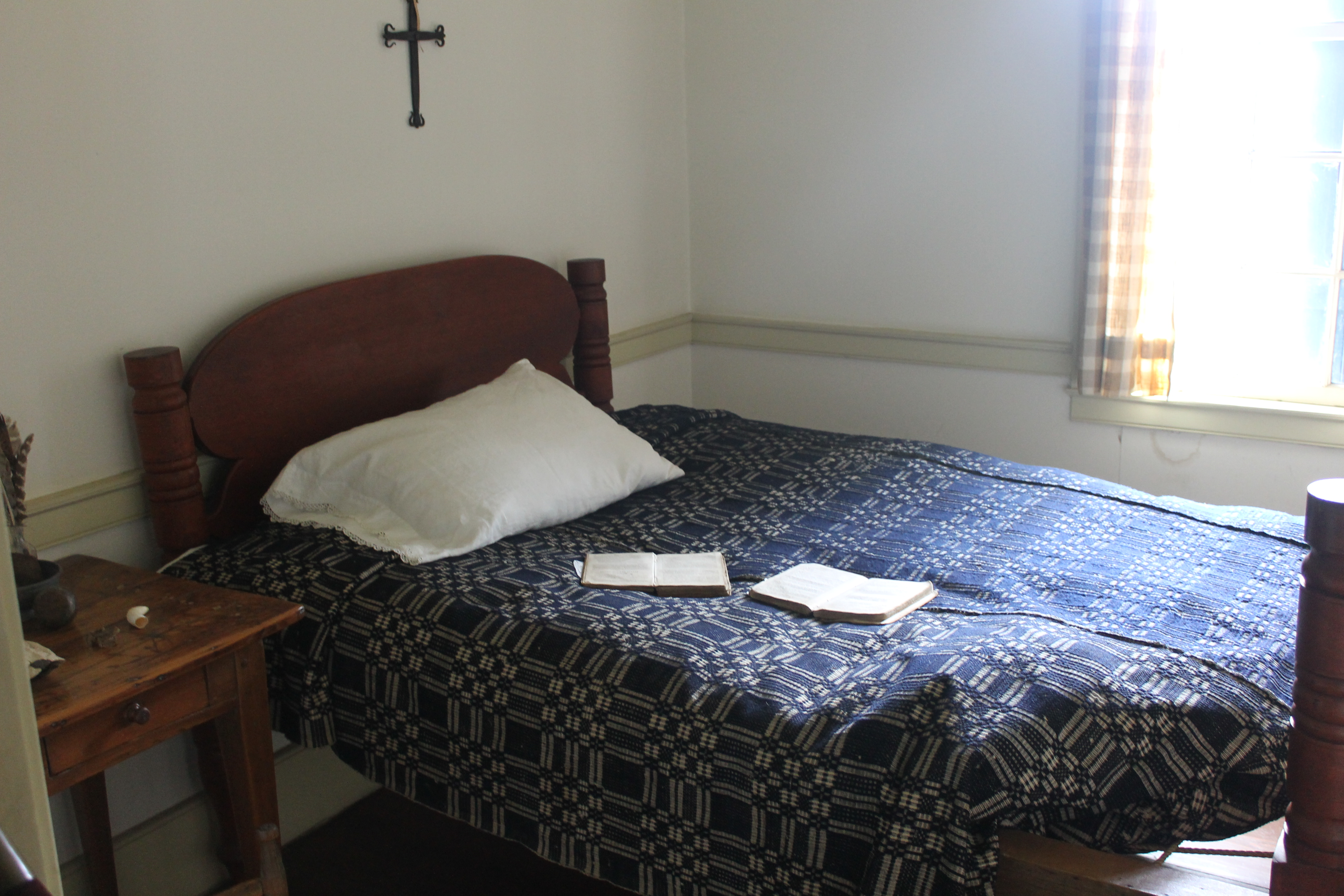
Boys' bedroom

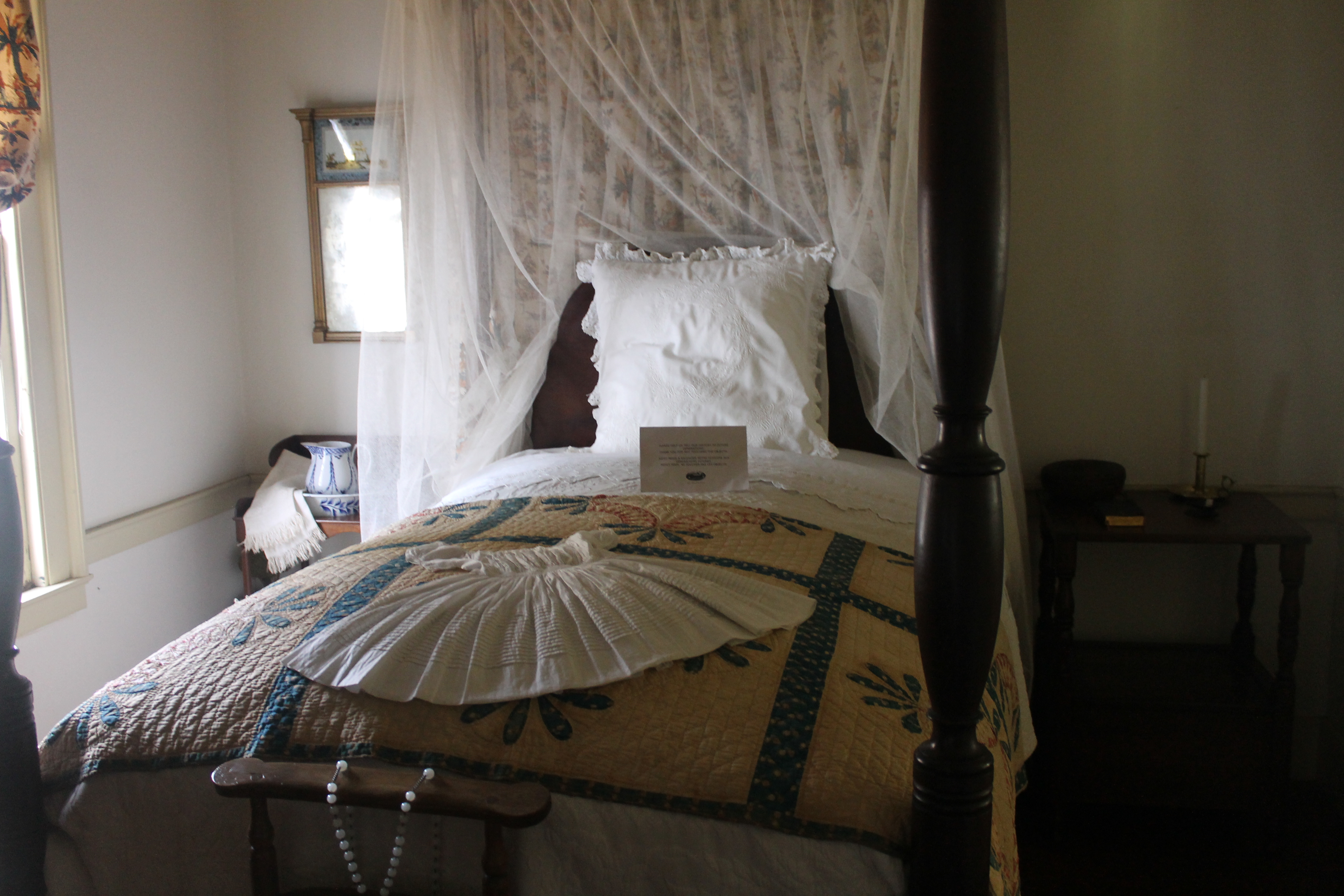
Girls' bedroom

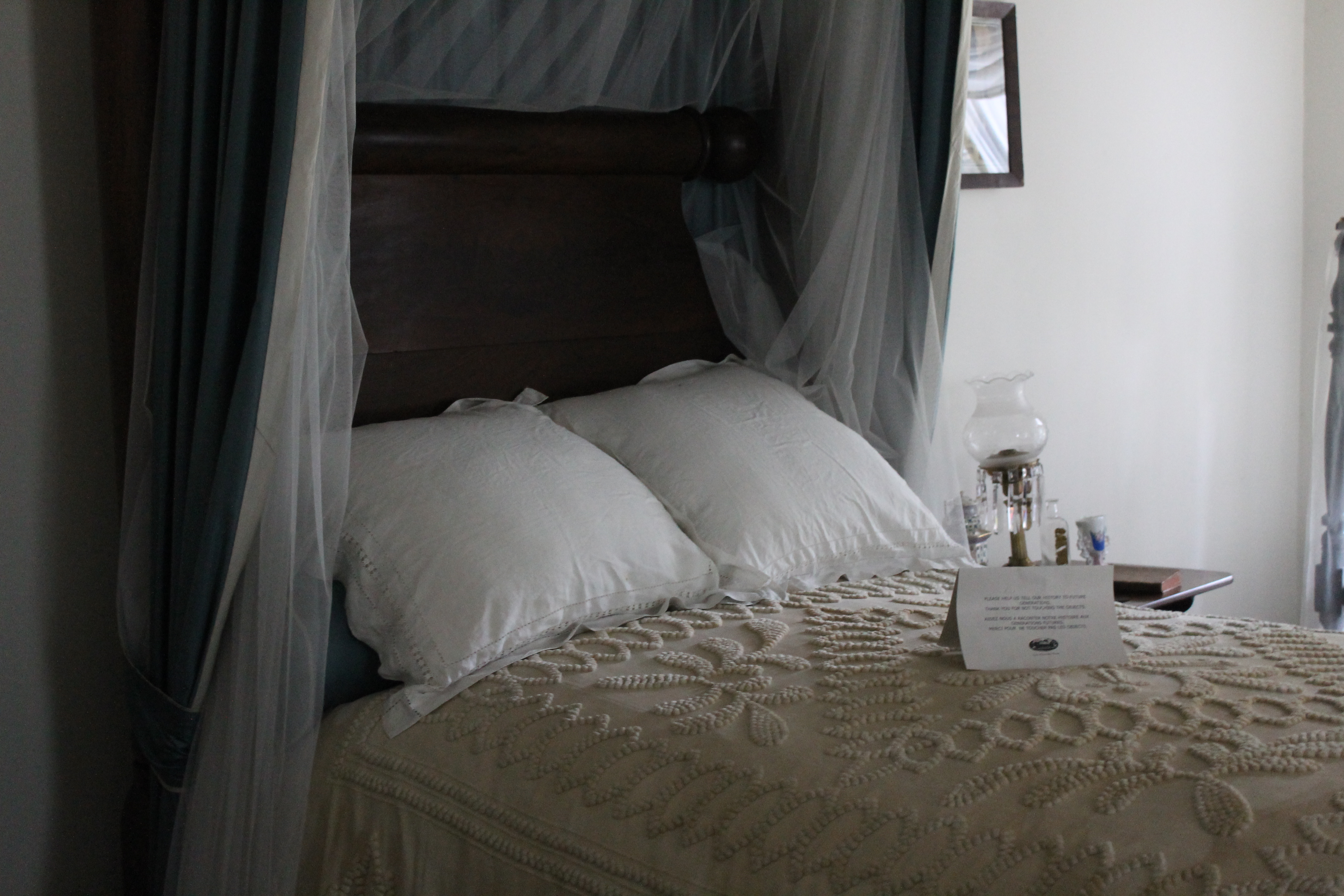
Master bedroom

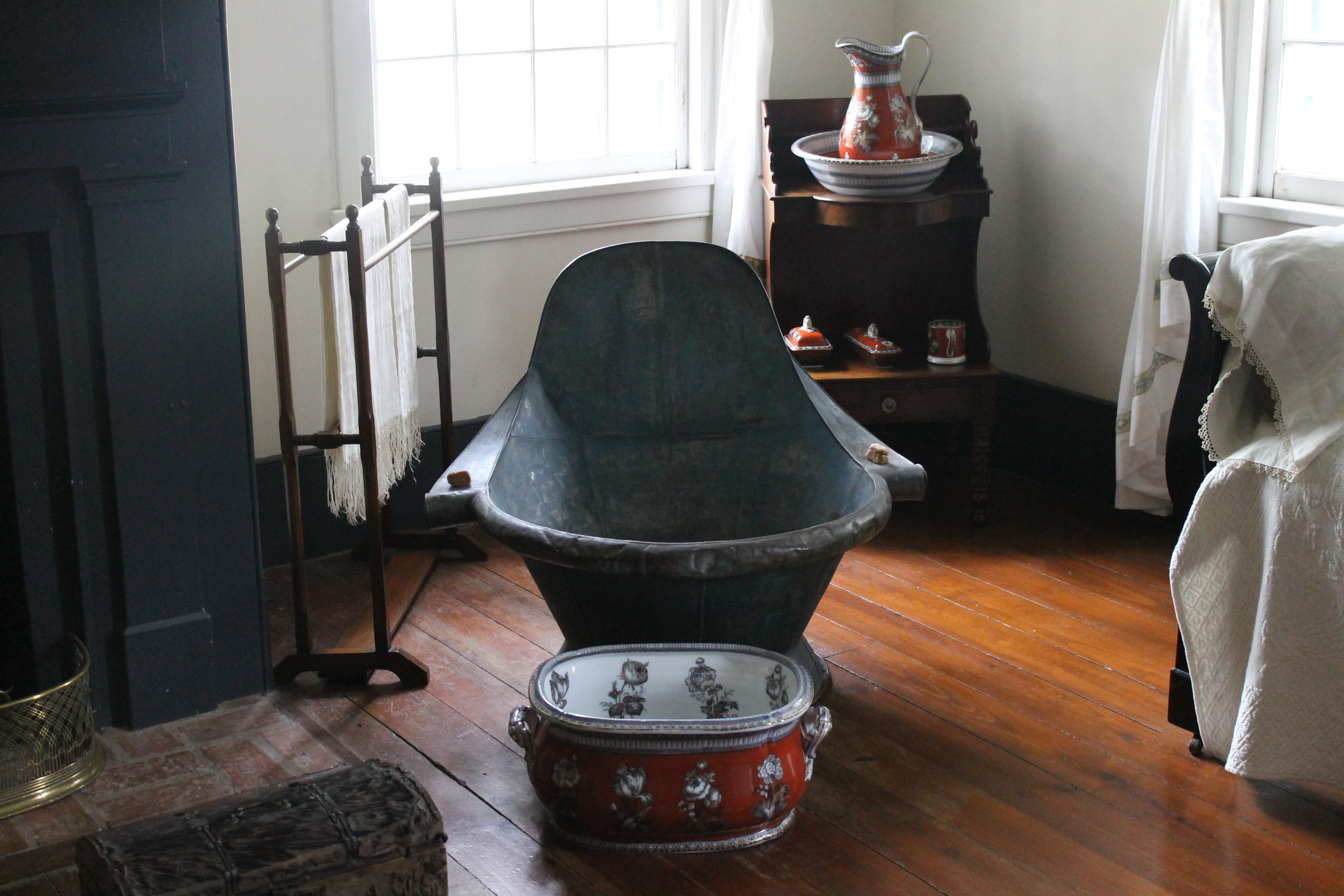
Bathtub in master bedroom
