= Kent Dairy Round Barn =

- U.S. National Register of Historic Places
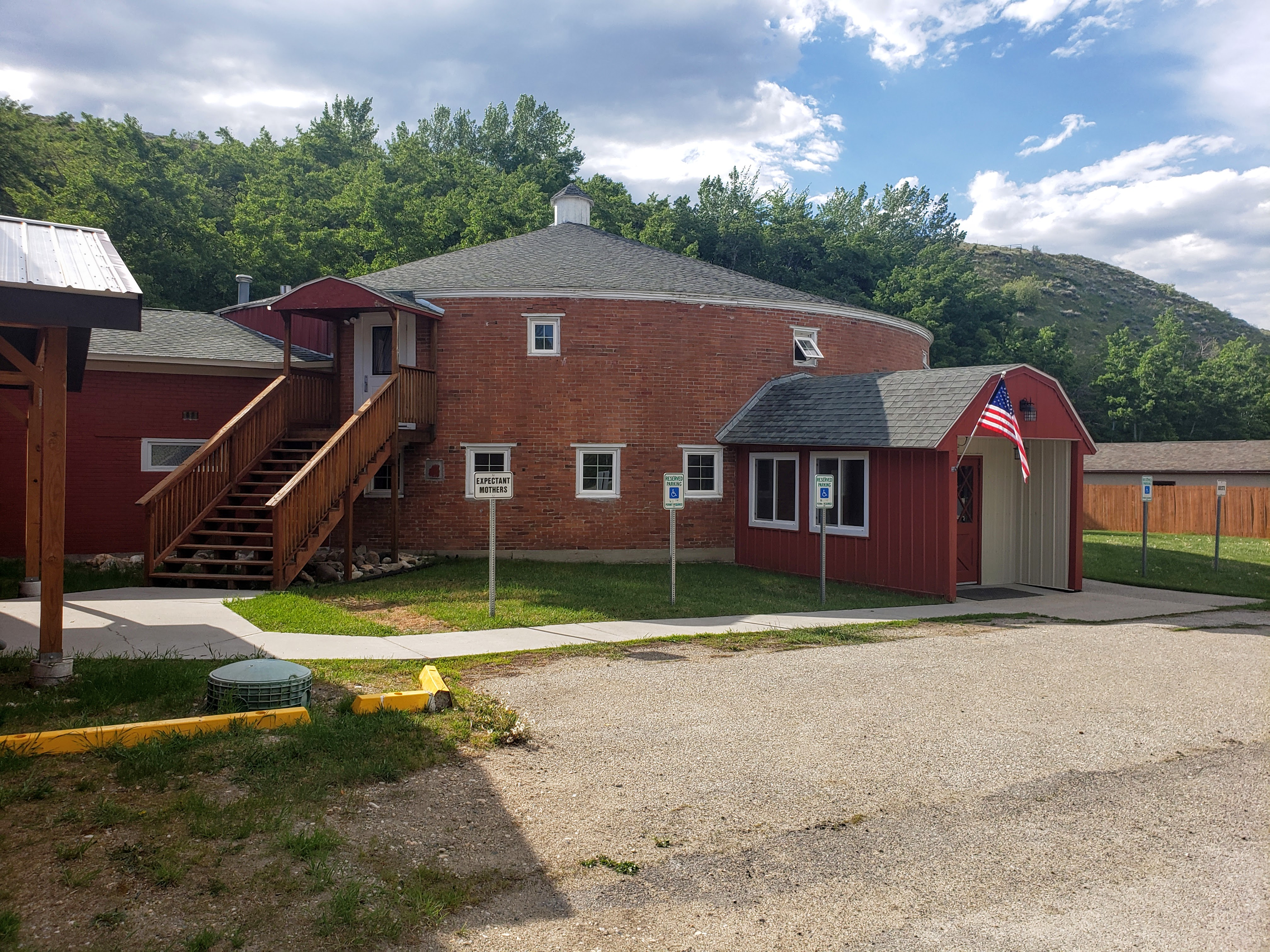

- Location within Montana Location within the United States
- Location: Along U.S. Route 212, 2 miles north of Red Lodge, Montana
- Coordinates: 45°13′09″N 109°14′29″W
- Area: 2 acres (0.81 ha)
- Built: 1941
- Built by: Ephraim Kent and sons
- NRHP reference No.: 95000381
- Added to NRHP: April 7, 1995

The Kent Dairy Round Barn near Red Lodge, Montana is a round barn that was built during 1939-1941 and is believed to be one of the last round dairy barns built in the United States. It has an adjoining rectangular milkhouse. The barn was built under supervision of master barn builder, Emery McNamee, by Ephraim Kent and sons Armas, Harry, James, Leo, and Waino.

It was listed on the National Register of Historic Places in 1995. The listing included two contributing buildings and one other contributing site.

It is a two-story building with red brick walls and is 60 feet (18 m) in diameter.
