= Kent House, Hammersmith =

Building in Hammersmith, London, England

Coordinates: 51.4895°N 0.2306°W

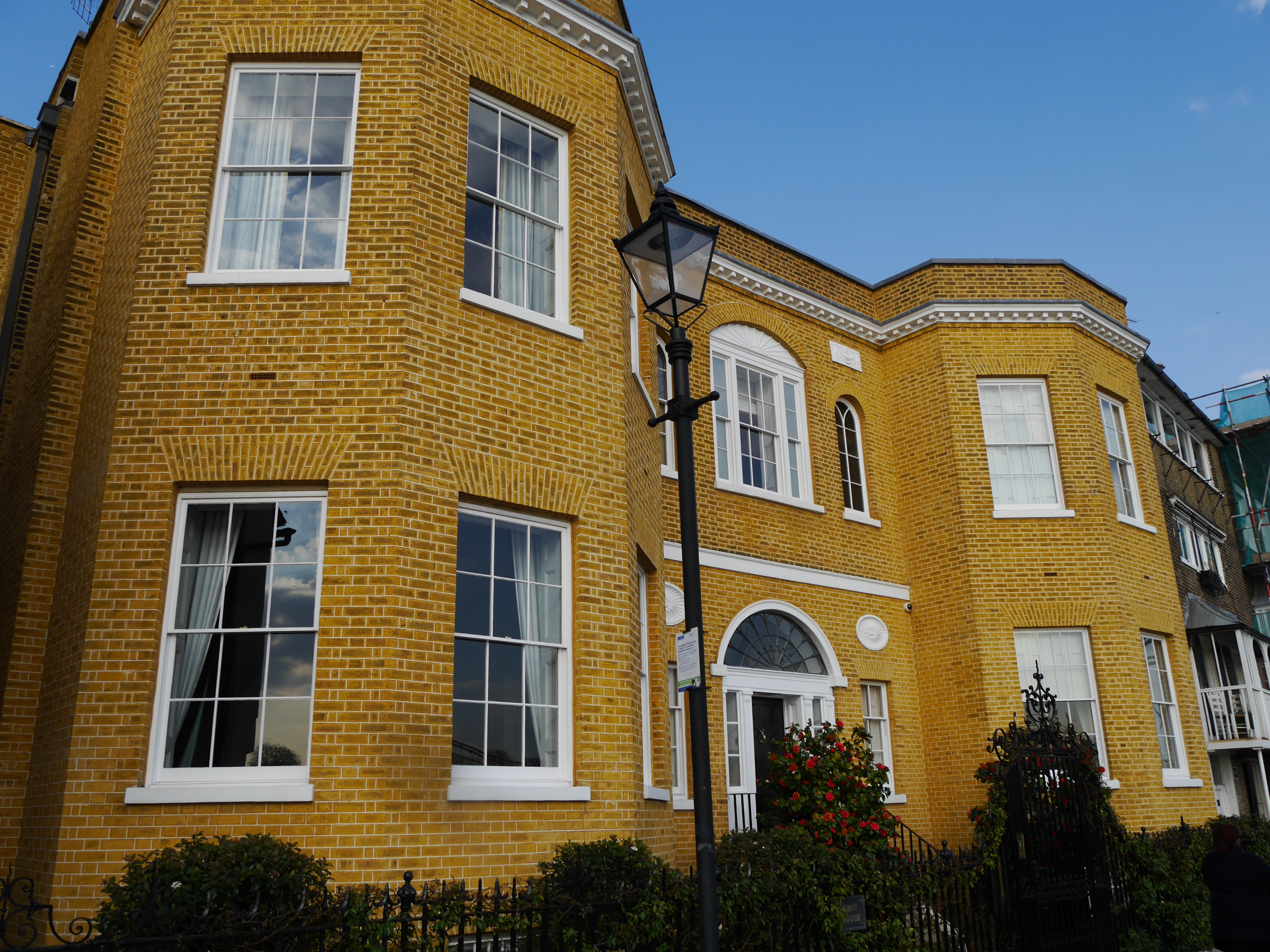
Kent House, Hammersmith

Kent House is a grade II listed building in Hammersmith, London. It was built in 1762, and for 150 years was the home of Hammersmith Working Men's Club. The building was renovated in 2006–2013.

== History ==
Kent House was built in about 1762, based on a 1710 house, and was further reconstructed in the 1780s.

In 2003, it had been the premises of the Hammersmith Working Men's Club for 150 years, but with declining membership and on the English Heritage Register of Listed Buildings at Risk. There was an "exhaustive restoration" from 2006 to 2013, supervised by Robin Walker Architects. In 2014, it was listed for sale at £9 million.

It is now the premises of the Hammersmith Club, with half of the building available as a private hire venue, and the rest available to the traditional members.
