= Kent-Delord House =

Historic house in New York, United States

- U.S. National Register of Historic Places
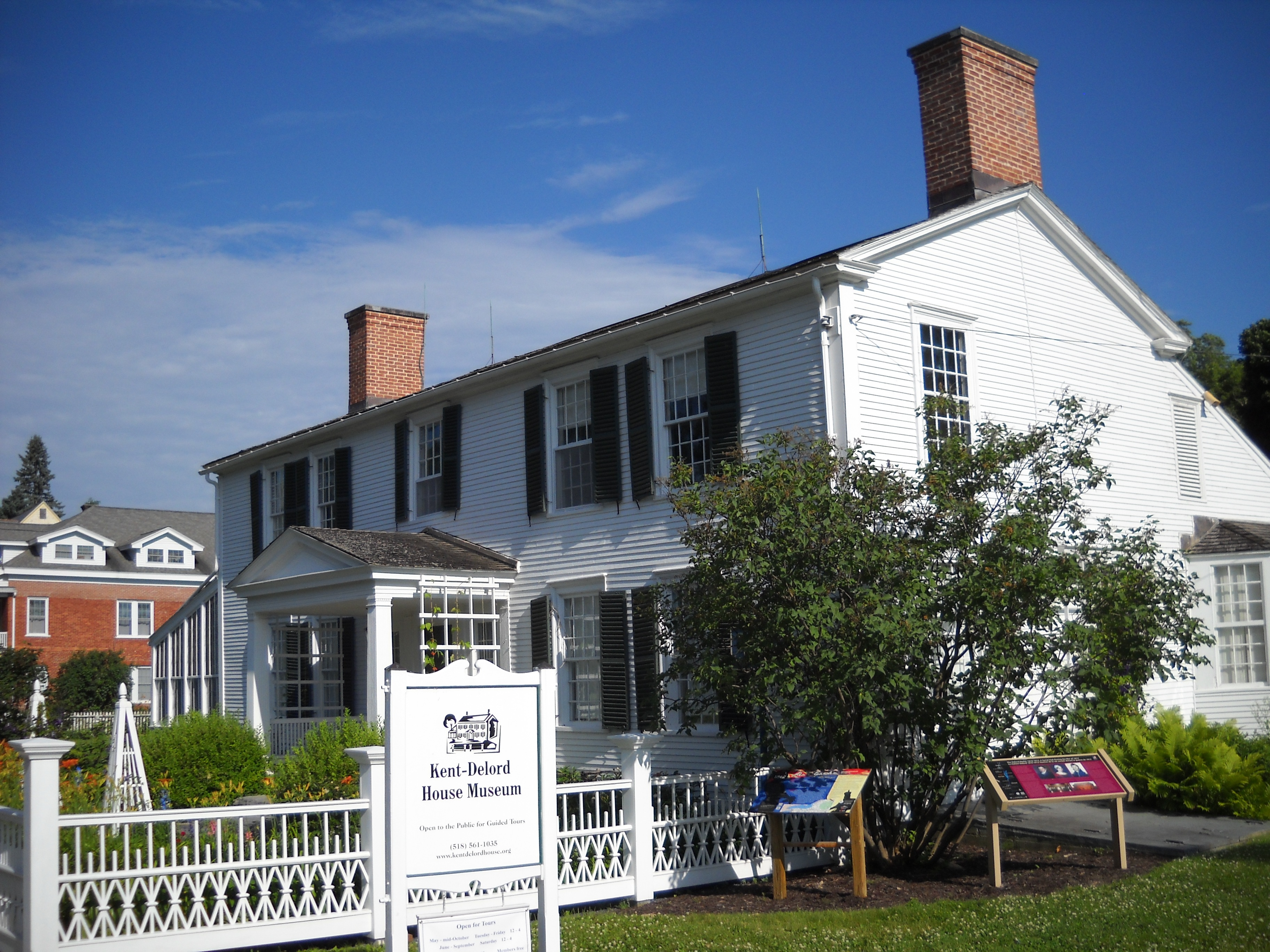
- Kent-Delord House

- Location within New York Location within the United States
- Interactive map showing the location for Kent-DeLord House
- Location: 17 Cumberland Ave., Plattsburgh, New York
- Coordinates: 44°42′12″N 73°27′8″W
- Built: 1797
- Architect: Averill, Nathan
- NRHP reference No.: 71000532
- Added to NRHP: February 18, 1971

Kent-Delord House, also known as Kent-Delord House Museum, is a historic home located at Plattsburgh in Clinton County, New York. It was built in 1797 and is reputedly the oldest house in Plattsburgh. It is a two-story, rectangular plan, wood frame dwelling with a gable roof. It features a one-story, pedimented entrance porch and inside end brick chimneys. It is open as a local history museum.

It was listed on the National Register of Historic Places in 1971.
