= List of German veterans of the International Brigades =

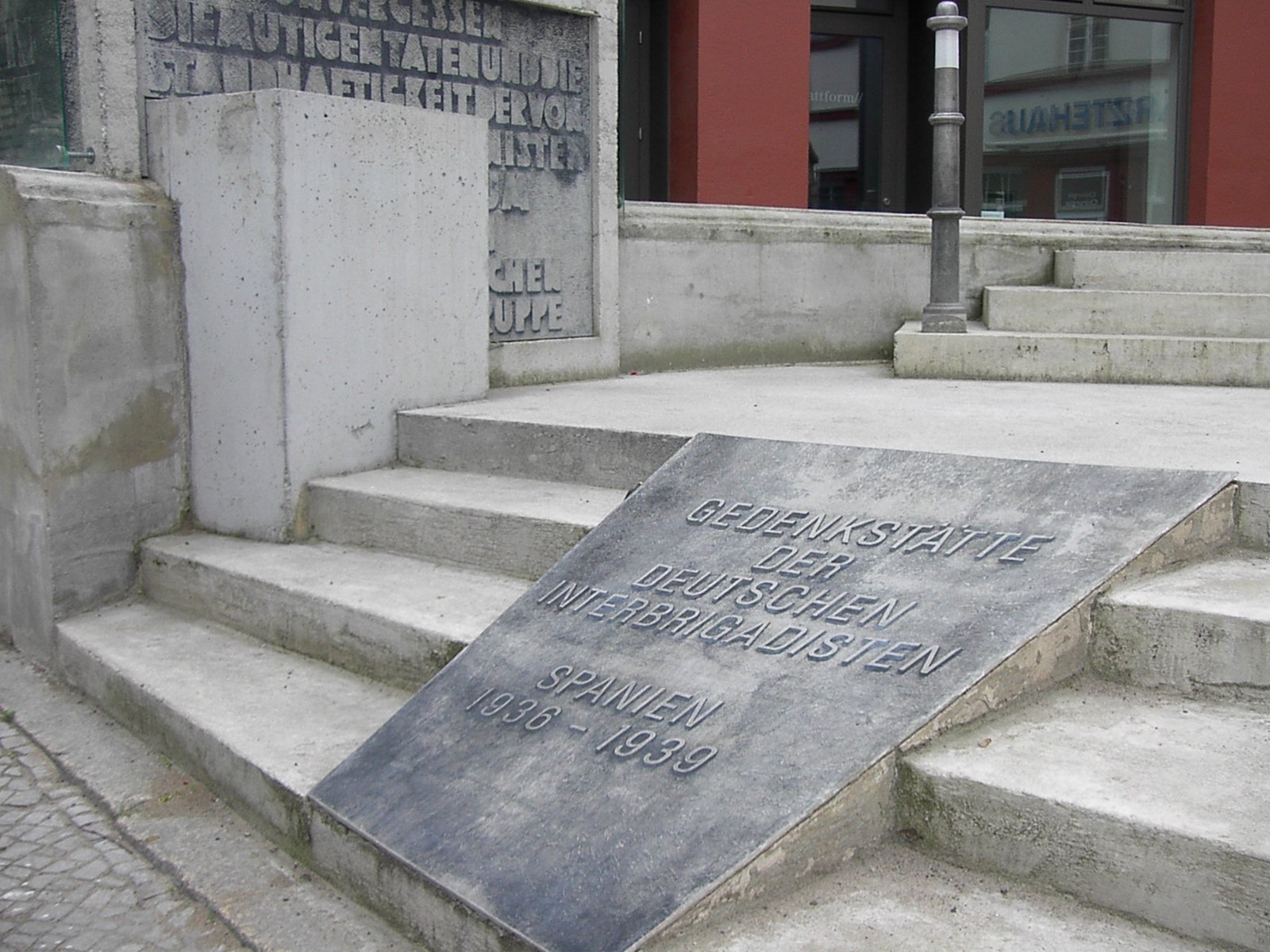
Memorial to the German Spanienkampfer ("Spanish fighters") in East Berlin

- Anton Ackermann – Director, International Brigades Political School. Member of the Volkskammer. DDR Minister of Foreign Affairs.
- Erich Arendt – Poet.
- Shimon Avidan – IDF commander.
- Artur Becker – Commissar, Thälmann Battalion. Chairman of the KJVD. Member of the Reichstag. Honored by the DDR with a stamp in 1966.
- Hans Beimler – Commissar, XI International Brigade. Member of the Landtag of Bavaria and the Reichstag. Honored by the DDR with a stamp in 1966.
- Walter Beling – Journalist, Deutscher Freiheitssender 29,8. DDR Permanent Representative to the United Nations Economic Commission for Europe.
- Wilhelm Bick – Captain, National Republican Guard. Member of the Volkskammer.
- Willi Bredel – Commissar, Thälmann Battalion. Member of the Volkskammer. Honored by the DDR with a stamp in 1966.
- Walter Breitfeld – Member of the Volkskammer.
- Kurt Bürger – Commander, International Brigades. Member of the Volkskammer.
- Ernst Busch – Singer, songwriter, actor.
- Ernst Buschmann – Section leader, Hans Beimler Battalion; commander, Edgar André Battalion.
- Liesel Carritt – Soldier and translator, Thälmann Battalion. Wife of Noel Carritt.
- Eduard Claudius – Commissar, International Brigades.
- Franz Dahlem – Commissar, International Brigades. Member of the Landtag of Prussia, the Reichstag, and the Volkskammer. SED Politburo member.
- Käthe Dahlem – Wife of Franz Dahlem.
- Julius Deutsch – General, International Brigades.
- Hermann Diamanski – German resistance leader.
- Friedrich Dickel – Platoon leader. Member of the Volkskammer. DDR Minister of the Interior.
- Heinrich Dollwetzel – Tank commander, International Brigades. Major General, Nationale Volksarmee.
- Emmy Dörfel – Nurse.
- Fritz Eikemeier – Chief of police, East Berlin.
- Carl Einstein – Writer, anarchist.
- Gustav Flohr – Member of the Reichstag. Mayor of Remscheid.
- Paul Försterling – Engineer commander, XI International Brigade.
- Arthur Franke – Lieutenant General, Nationale Volksarmee.
- Fritz Fränken – Commissar, Hans Beimler Battalion. Member of the Landtag of Prussia.
- Erich Glückauf – Journalist, Deutscher Freiheitssender 29,8. Member of the Volkskammer.
- Kurt Julius Goldstein – Editor-in-chief, major radio station Deutschlandsender.
- Herbert Grünstein – DDR Deputy Minister of the Interior.
- Gustav Gundelach – Head of the Red Cross, International Brigades. Member of the Bundestag.
- Juan Guzmán – Photojournalist.
- Kurt Hager – Journalist, Deutscher Freiheitssender 29,8. SED Politburo member.
- Georg Henke – DDR Ambassador to North Korea.
- Erich Henschke – Editor-in-chief, Berliner Zeitung.
- Max Hodann – Military doctor.
- Karl-Heinz Hoffmann – Battalion commander, XI International Brigade. Member of the Volkskammer. Army General, Nationale Volksarmee.
- Paul Hornick – Staff officer, XI International Brigade. Member of the Reichstag.
- Paul Jahnke – Commissar, International Brigades. Chief Inspector, Prenzlauer Berg Volkspolizei.
- Walter Janka – Commander, Thälmann Battalion.
- Max Kahane – Journalist. Editor, Allgemeiner Deutscher Nachrichtendienst.
- Hans Kahle – Commander, XI International Brigade. Honored by the DDR with a stamp in 1966.
- Fritz Kahmann – Commissar, XI International Brigade. Member of the Landtag of Prussia and the Reichstag.
- Egon Erwin Kisch – German-Czech journalist, writer.
- Heinz Kiwitz – Artist.
- Erich Kops – Officer, Thälmann Battalion. Member of the Volkskammer. DDR Ambassador to Hungary.
- Erwin Kramer – DDR Minister of Transport. Member of the Volkskammer.
- Gerhard Kratzat – Intelligence agent.
- Willi Kreikemeyer – Chief adjudant, International Brigades.
- Ernst Krüger – Member of the Volkskammer.
- Otto Kühne – Commissar, XI International Brigade. Maquis fighter. Mayor of Brandenburg an der Havel.
- Kurt Lichtenstein – Commissar, Thälmann Battalion.
- Hans Marchwitza – Lieutenant, Chapaev Battalion. Honored by the DDR with a stamp in 1966.
- David Martin – Poet.
- Hanns Maaßen – Contributing editor, El voluntario de la libertad. Journalist, Deutscher Freiheitssender 29,8.
- Karl Mewis – Commissar, International Brigades. Member of the Volkskammer. District Secretary of the SED.
- Erich Mielke – Third head of the Stasi.
- Ewald Munschke – Major General, Nationale Volksarmee.
- Alfred Neumann – SED Politburo member. Member of the Volkskammer.
- Maria Osten – Special correspondent, Deutsche Zentral-Zeitung.
- Erwin Panndorf – Repair platoon commander, International Brigades. Agent, GRU.
- Wilhelm Pinnecke – Member of the Reichstag.
- Vinzent Porombka – SED Central Committee member.
- Josef Raab – Major, Thälmann Battalion. German resistance leader.
- Heinrich Rau – Commander, XI International Brigade. Member of the Landtag of Prussia and the Volkskammer. German resistance leader. SED Politburo member. Honored by the DDR with a stamp in 1966.
- Heinz Rauch – Lieutenant, XI International Brigade. Member of the DDR Council of Ministers.
- Gustav Regler – Commissar, XII International Brigade.
- Ludwig Renn – Writer. Section leader, XI International Brigade.
- Max Roscher – Member of the Reichstag.
- Hans Schaul – Member of the General Inspectorate, International Brigades. Editor-in-chief, Einheit.
- Ernst Scholz – DDR Minister for Construction. Member of the Volkskammer.
- Albert Schreiner – Chief of staff, XIII International Brigade.
- Hermann Schuldt – Member of the Reichstag.
- Heinrich Schürmann – Commander, Edgar André Battalion.
- Augustin Souchy – Anarchist, trade unionist.
- Richard Staimer – Commander, XI International Brigade.
- Toni Stemmler – Nurse. Member of the Volkskammer.
- Kurt Stern – Commissar, XI International Brigade. Screenwriter, DEFA.
- Georg Stibi – Journalist. Editor, Berliner Zeitung.
- Gerda Taro – Photojournalist.
- Bodo Uhse – Officer, International Brigades. Member of the Volkskammer. President of the German Writers' Union.
- Paul Verner – SED Politburo member. Member of the Volkskammer.
- Walter Vesper – NKVD agent. Member of the Bundestag. DDR Ambassador to Hungary and Czechoslovakia.
- Erich Weinert – War correspondent.
- Ernst Wollweber – Weapons supplier. Second head of the Stasi.
- Wilhelm Zaisser – General "Gomez," military leader of the International Brigades in 1937. Member of the Volkskammer. First head of the Stasi.
- Maxim Zetkin – Military doctor.

== See also ==
- International Brigades order of battle
- XI International Brigade
- XII International Brigade
- XIII International Brigade
- Thälmann Battalion
- Edgar André Battalion
- Hans Beimler Battalion
- Hans Beimler Medal

== Sources ==
- Sammelrez: Internationale Brigaden in der DDR (Joint Review: The International Brigades in East Germany), Arnold Krammer
