= International Brigades order of battle =

The International Brigades Star

The International Brigades (IB) were volunteer military units of foreigners who fought on the side of the Second Spanish Republic during the Spanish Civil War. The number of combatant volunteers has been estimated at between 32,000–35,000, though with no more than about 20,000 active at any one time. A further 10,000 people probably participated in non-combatant roles and about 3,000–5,000 foreigners were members of CNT or POUM. They came from a claimed "53 nations" to fight against the Spanish Nationalist forces led by General Francisco Franco and assisted by German and Italian forces.

The volunteers were motivated to fight on political or social grounds and made their way to Spain independently of the Spanish government. The brigades were not initially formally conceived and methodically recruited. Instead, they evolved as a means of organising the streams of volunteers arriving from every quarter of the world. It has been estimated that up to 25% of IB volunteers were Jewish. This article describes the order of battle of each of the International Brigades, describing the order and manner in which each brigade was mustered and formed, and following the progress of individual battalions throughout the conflict.

== Introduction ==
=== Early International units ===
The first volunteers arrived in Spain in mid-August 1936. These were mostly Franco-Belgian, German, British and Italian. At first, they grouped themselves into sections, called Columns or Centuria (nominally of a hundred men). These were mostly formed in August/September 1936.

- The Tom Mann Centuria, named after English trade unionist leader Tom Mann, became part of the Thaelmann Battalion
- The Thaelmann Centuria (the nucleus of the Thaelmann Battalion), named for Ernst Thälmann.
- Gastone Sozzi Centuria, named for Gastone Sozzi
- Rosselli's Italian Column
- Colonna Giustizia e Libertà

=== Brigade structure ===
Each brigade was a mixed brigade consisting of four battalions, sometimes with an ancillary specialist support company. They had a brigade commander and a political commissar, and a small brigade staff. Initially, the battalions were formed entirely of foreign volunteers but, increasingly, it became practice to have at least one Spanish battalion in each brigade (and, from spring 1937, one Spanish company in each battalion). As time went on, and the difficulties of recruiting new international volunteers increased, the percentage of Spaniards went up. At first, these were volunteers but conscription was later introduced. The brigades were formally incorporated into the Spanish Army in September 1937, as Spanish Foreign Legion units.

=== Battalion structure ===
The battalions were originally organised by language, with volunteers sharing the same (or similar languages) and given names that reflected the groups. To develop an esprit de corps, these names were replaced by names of inspirational figures or events, for example, Garibaldi, or Commune de Paris.

"Theoretically, the Battalion organisation consisted of the Battalion Commander, his Second in Command, the Political Commissar, the Adjutant and orderly room staff, three Companies of infantry, one machine-gun Company, Battalion scouts, and the Quartermaster and cookhouse staff. There were three platoons in each company, each divided into [four] sections of ten men, so that the Battalion at full strength would number more than 500 men...."

=== Political commissars ===
See article: Political commissar

=== International brigade depots ===
- Albacete - Headquarters
- Madrigueras - Training camp
- Tiflis - Officer training school
- Camp Lukácz - Penal battalion

== XI International Brigade ==
Names:

- The Hans Beimler Brigade (after Hans Beimler)
- The Thälmann Brigade (after Ernst Thälmann)

Songs by Ernst Busch and the choir of the XI Brigade:

- (in German) Hans Beimler Lied
- (in German) Lied von XI Brigade ("Song of the XIth Brigade")
- (in German) Lied der XI Brigade Or Ballade or Marsch der XI Brigade)

Detailed Order of Battle

- (in Spanish) EPR Order of Battle Website
- (in Spanish) Associació Catalana Website

=== Formation ===
- Formed at Albacete: 14–17 October 1936 as IX Brigada Movil ("Mobile Brigade").
  - 1st Bn Franco-Belgian (14 October 1936)
  - 2nd Bn Austro-German (14 October 1936)
  - 3rd Bn Italo-Spanish (14 October 1936)
  - 4th Bn Polish-Balkan (17 October 1936)
- Re-Organised: 14–22 October 1936 as XI "Hans Beimler" International Brigade. The battalions were renamed as follows:
  - Commune de Paris Battalion (after the Paris Commune. (Formerly 1st Franco-Belge)
  - Edgar André Battalion (after Edgar André). (Formerly 2nd Austro-German)
  - Garibaldi Battalion (after Giuseppe Garibaldi). (Formerly 3rd Italo-Español)
  - Dabrowski Battalion (pronounced Dombrowski), (after Jarosław Dąbrowski). (Formerly 4th Polish-Balkan)
- Minor Re-Organisation: 3 November 1936
  - Garibaldi Battalion, as it had no rifles, was transferred to XII Brigade
  - Thaelmann Battalion joined XI Brigade from XII Brigade
  - Asturias-Heredia Battalion (Spanish) joined XI Brigade.

=== Brigade staff ===
Brigade Commanders:)

- 22 Oct. 1936 - 31 Oct. 1936 Jean Marie François (French)
- 01 Nov. 1936 - 20 Nov. 1936 Manfred Stern (Ukrainian?)
- 20 Nov. 1936 – 31 Mar. 1937 Col. Hans Kahle (German)
- April 1937 – Nov/Dec 1937 Maj. Richard Staimer (German)
- December 1937 – March 1938 Maj. Heinrich Rau (German) (acting commander since 3 Nov. 1937)
- March 1938 – April 1938 Maj. Gustav Szinda (German)
- April 1938 – September 1938 Maj. Otto Flatter (Hungarian)
- September 1938 – January 1939 Maj. Adolf Reiner (Austrian)

Chiefs of Staff:

- December 1936 – June 1937 Ludwig Renn (German)
- July 1937 – September 1937 Gustav Szinda (German)
- October 1937 – December 1937 Maj. Heinrich Rau (German)

Brigade Commissars:

- October 1936 – December 1936 Hans Beimler (German)
- December 1936 – January 1937 Giuseppe Di Vittorio (Italian)
- February 1937 – April 1937 Artur Dorf (German)
- May 1937 – September 1937 Heinrich Rau (German)
- September 1937 – January 1938 Kurt Frank (German)
- January 1938 – March 1938 Richard Schenk (German)
- March 1938 – January 1939 Ernest Blank (German)

=== Division "Kléber" (XI and XII Brigade 20 Nov.36 - 4 Feb 37 ) ===
- Commander: General "Kléber" (Manfred Stern)

== XII International Brigade ==
Name: The Garibaldi Brigade

Detailed Order of Battle

- (in Spanish) EPR Order of Battle Website
- (in Spanish) Associació Catalana Website

=== Formation ===
Raised 22 October 1936 at Albacete, General "Lukàcs" (Mate Zalka) commanding. (Lukàcs was killed during the Huesca Offensive.)

- Units that formed part of the Brigade at different times:
  - André Marty Battalion
  - Dabrowski Battalion a.k.a. Dombrowski Battalion
  - Figlio Battalion
  - Garibaldi Battalion
  - Madrid Battalion
  - Prieto Battalion
  - Thaelmann Battalion

== XIII International Brigade ==
Names: The Dabrowski Brigade, The Dombrowski Brigade

Detailed Order of Battle

- (in Spanish) EPR Order of Battle Website
- (in Spanish) Associació Catalana Website

=== 1st formation ===
Raised: 12 December 1936

- Louise Michel (II) Battalion
- Chapaev Battalion (Tchapaiev, Czapiaew; named for Vasily Chapayev)
- Vuillemin Battalion
  - One Balkan Company
  - 1st Battery "Ernst Thaelmann"
  - 2nd Battery "Karl Liebknecht"
  - 3rd Battery "Antoni Gramsci"

=== 2nd formation ===
Reformed: 4 August 1937

- Dabrowski Battalion
- Palafox Battalion
- Rakosi Battalion

=== 3rd formation ===
Reformed (in Monredón): 1 October 1938 (exclusively Spanish battalions)

=== 4th formation ===
Reformed: 23 January 1939 (from demobilised International Brigade members who had remained in Spain)

=== Brigade staff ===
Brigade Commanders:

- General "Gomez" Wilhelm Zaisser

Chiefs of Staff:

- Albert Schreiner "Schindler" (German)

Brigade Commissars:

- Ferry (Italian)

== XIV International Brigade ==
Name: The Marseillaise Brigade

Order of Battle

- (in Spanish) EPR Order of Battle Website
- (in Spanish) Associació Catalana Website

=== Formation ===
Raised 20 December 1936 with volunteers mainly from France and Belgium, under General "Walter" (Karol Świerczewski). After the Battle of Brunete (6–25 July 1937), brigade strength was reduced from four to two battalions. The battalions attached to this Brigade at different times were:

  - Commune de Paris Battalion
  - Domingo Germinal Battalion
  - Henri Barbusse Battalion
  - Louise Michel I Battalion
  - Louise Michel II Battalion
  - Marsellaise Battalion
  - Pierre Brachet Battalion
  - Primera Unidad de Avance Battalion
  - Nine Nations Battalion a.k.a. Sans noms or Des Neuf Nationalités Battalion
  - Sixth February Battalion
  - Vaillant-Couturier Battalion

== XV International Brigade ==
- Name: The Abraham Lincoln Brigade
- Raised: Albacete, 31 January 1937
- Brigade songs: Jarama Valley, An tldirnisinta (Internationale), Viva la Quinta Brigada, Ay Carmela (song) (Viva La Quince Brigada)
- Battles: Jarama, Brunete, Boadilla, Belchite, Fuentes de Ebro, Teruel, Aragón, Ebro

Order of Battle

Date joined	Number	Battalion Name	Composition	Date left	Comments
31 January 1937	16th	British Battalion	Irish, Basque, Catalan & British	23 September 1938	Demobilised
31 January 1937	17th	Lincoln Battalion	US, Canada, Irish, British	23 September 1938	Demobilised
31 January 1937	18th	Dimitrov Battalion	Balkan	20 September 1937	Moved to 45th Div. Reserve
31 January 1937	19th	Sixth February Battalion	French & Belgian	4 August 1937	Moved to 14th Brigade
14 March 1937	24th	Volontario 24	Spanish volunteers		Destroyed in the Ebro Battles
5 April 1937	~	Español Battalion	Latin Americans	23 September 1938	Demobilised
29 June 1937	~	Mackenzie-Papineau Battalion	Canadian & US	23 September 1938	Demobilised
4 July 1937	20th	Washington Battalion	US	14 July 1937	Merged with Lincoln Battalion

Main Sources: (i) (in Spanish) EPR Order of Battle Website, (ii) *(in Spanish) Associació Catalana Website

- Sub-battalion units attached to Brigade
  - Connolly Column (Irish volunteers operating as a unit of the Lincoln Battalion)
  - Brigade Anti-Tank Company
  - XVth Brigade Photographic Unit (August 1937 – September 1938) Archive
- Re-organised May/June 1937, into two regiments:
  - First regiment, commanded by George Nathan
    - Lincoln Bn, commanded by Robert Hale Merriman
    - Washington Bn, commanded by Mirko Markovic
    - British Bn, commanded by Fred Copeman
  - Second regiment, commanded by Major "Chapaiev"
    - Dimitrov Battalion
    - Sixth February Battalion
    - Voluntario 24 Battalion (Spanish) (Capitano Aquilla)
- Post-Brunete, reinforced by:
  - Mackenzie-Papineau Battalion
- International Volunteers Demobilised
  - Barcelona, 23 September 1938

== Other International Brigades ==
=== 86th Brigade ===
Raised 13 February 1938

- Units that formed part of the Brigade at different times:
  - Veinte Battalion (Twentieth Battalion)

=== CXXIX / 129th Brigade ===
Name/s: Central European Brigade Raised 13 February 1938

- Units that formed part of the Brigade at different times:
  - Dimitrov Battalion
  - Djuro Djakovic Battalion (after Đuro Đaković)
  - Thomas Mazaryk Battalion (after Tomáš Masaryk)
  - Tschapaiew Battalion

=== CL / 150th Brigade ===
Name/s: Dabowski Brigade Raised 27 May 1937

- Units that formed part of the Brigade at different times:
  - André Marty Battalion (after André Marty)
  - Mathis Rakosi Battalion (after Mátyás Rákosi)

=== Ad hoc units ===
- Agrupació Torunczyk (21 January 1939 – 9 February 1939)
  - Elements from XI, XIII and XV Brigades

Catalonia Offensive

- Agrupació Szuster (1 February 1939 – 9 February 1939)
  - Elements from XII and CXXIX Brigades

Catalonia Offensive

== See also ==
- Foreign legions
- List of German veterans of the International Brigades

== Sources ==
- Beevor, Antony. (2006). The Battle for Spain: The Spanish Civil War 1936-1939. London: Weidenfeld & Nicolson, 2006. ISBN 978-0-297-84832-5
- Gurney, Jason (1974) Crusade in Spain. London: Faber, 1974. ISBN 978-0-571-10310-2
- Thomas, Hugh. (1961) The Spanish Civil War. London: Eyre & Spottiswoode, 1961.
- Thomas, Hugh. (2003) The Spanish Civil War, 2003. London: Penguin (Revised 4th edition), 2003. ISBN 978-0-14-101161-5
- O'Riordan, Michael. "The Connolly Column", 1979. Reprinted by Warren and Pell, 2005.
- Rust, William (2003). "Britons in Spain", 1939. Reprinted by Warren and Pell, 2003.
- Ryan, Frank (ed.) "The Book of the XV Brigade", 1938. Reprinted by Warren and Pell, 2003. ()
- Sugarman, Martin. Jews Who Served in The Spanish Civil War PDF file
