= Josef Raab =

German politician (1899–1971)

Mayor of Penzberg
- In office 21 June 1945 – 29 January 1946
- Preceded by: Jakob Dellinger
- Succeeded by: Anton Prandl

Personal details
- Born: 27 May 1899 Penzberg, German Empire
- Died: 28 January 1971 (aged 71) Penzberg, West Germany
- Party: Communist Party of Germany (1928–1956)
- Relatives: Paul Rabb (brother)
- Awards: Hans Beimler Medal (1956)
- Military Service
- Allegiance: (Spain) Second Spanish Republic
- Branch: Spanish Republican Army
- Service years: 1936–1939
- Rank: Major
- Units: 35th Division; XI International Brigade; Thälmann Battalion
- Commands: Thälmann Battalion
- Conflicts: Spanish Civil War

Josef Raab (27 May 1899 – 28 January 1971) was a German politician, military officer and member of the German resistance against Nazism. He served as commander of the Thälmann Battalion on two separate occasions and as mayor of Penzberg from 1945 to 1946.

== Early life ==
Josef Raab was born on 27 May 1899 in Penzberg, the son of a mining family. He began an apprenticeship as a locksmith in Walchensee on 1 March 1913, which he successfully completed on 1 March 1916. Shortly after his 18th birthday, he was drafted into military service. From April 1919, Raab worked as a locksmith in the Penzberg mine. In the 1920s, he became regional champion in wrestling. In 1928, he joined the Communist Party of Germany (KPD).

== Resistance to Nazism ==
Raab played a role in resisting the Nazi rise to power. He was a member of the Roter Frontkämpferbund. When the Roter Frontkämpferbund was banned in 1929, he joined the Combat League against Fascism (Kampfbund gegen den Faschismus).

After the Nazi Party seized power in 1933, it launched a crackdown on anti-fascist activists. Raab lived underground with a group of comrades, initially in the Beuerberg area, later in Antdorf and Hohenkasten. At the end of 1933, Raab was in Bichl and was recognized by a Penzberg businessman who had been a member of the Nazi Party since January 1933. Raab fled with a comrade on his motorbike to Austria, where he hid for a few weeks in the Karwendel Mountains, and then moved on to Switzerland.

In Switzerland he immediately became involved in anti-fascist work. Raab and his comrades smuggled anti-Nazi leaflets and newspapers into Germany. He also illegally crossed into Germany multiple times to help organize resistance. At a meeting in Munich in 1934, he was confronted by the Gestapo. He pretended to accept the Gestapo's offer to supply them with information in the future. This bought him a day's freedom, which he used to flee to Switzerland. Raab remained in Switzerland until the spring of 1936, then went to France and resumed his anti-fascist activities in Paris.

== Spanish Civil War ==
In July 1936, Raab enlisted in the International Brigades, and arrived in Barcelona on 10 August 1936. There he was integrated into the Thälmann Battalion. Due to his military experience in the First World War and in the Roter Frontkämpferbund, he became an officer. Raab was commander of the Thälmann Battalion from February to May 1937 and again from July 1938 to January 1939; holding the rank of major.

== Internment in France ==
After the defeat of the Spanish Republican Army, Raab crossed the Spanish-French border at the Pyrenees with the XI International Brigade on 9 February 1939. He was taken to an internment camp near St. Cyprien by French authorities. The internment camp was an open area in the sand dunes near the sea, fenced in with barbed wire. To protect themselves from the cold and sandstorms, the prisoners had to dig holes in the sand to find shelter. There was a lack of sanitary facilities, medical care, and food at the camp. Diseases such as dysentery, scurvy, and typhus broke out in the camp; the conditions in the camp contributed significantly to health problems Raab would experience throughout his life.

Conditions improved somewhat when Raab and many of his fellow prisoners were transferred to the Gurs internment camp and later to Camp Vernet.

== Escape from internment and participation in the French Resistance ==
After the fall of France in 1940, the armistice of 22 June 1940 stipulated that all Germans in French custody were to be handed over to Germany. Many Germans who had fought in the Spanish Civil War for the Spanish Republic were deported to concentration camps. In October 1941, Raab and some of his comrades managed to escape from Camp Vernet. In Toulouse, he was able to make contact with resistance circles and travelled on to Switzerland. In Switzerland, he was arrested and extradited back to France; he was interned again in Camp Vernet.

In November 1942, Raab was removed from Camp Vernet and taken to Castres in preparation for extradition to Germany. On the evening of 16 September 1943 he was among 36 prisoners who managed to escape. The majority of those who escaped joined the French Resistance, including Raab. Despite serious health problems, he took part in Resistance actions, particularly in the city of Toulouse. Later, in Marseille, he was a member of the FTP-MOI leadership. After the liberation of Paris in the summer of 1944, he joined the Committee for a Free Germany for the West (Komitee Freies Deutschland für den Westen).

== Mayor of Penzberg ==
In June 1945, Raab returned to Penzberg. With the support of local mine workers, he was appointed acting mayor of Penzberg by the American occupation authorities. He held this office from 21 June 1945 to 29 January 1946.

In the first post-war municipal elections, the social democrat Anton Prandl succeeded Raab as mayor; while Raab was elected to the town council as a member of the Communist Party of Germany (KPD). Raab remained on Penzburg town council until 25 April 1948. His brother Paul Raab sat on the council from January 1953 to April 1956, also as a member of the KPD. In 1956, he was awarded the Hans Beimler Medal for his service in the Spanish Civil War.
