= Willi Bredel =

German writer (1901–1964)

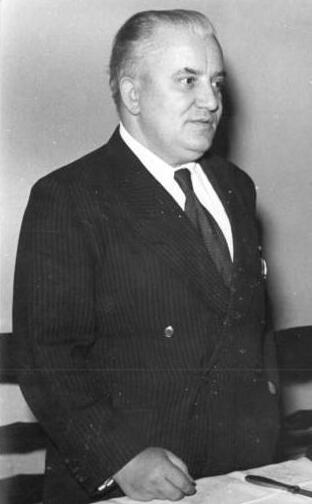
- Willi Bredel in 1951

President of the Academy of Arts of the German Democratic Republic
- In office 1962–1964
- Preceded by: Otto Nagel
- Succeeded by: Konrad Wolf

Personal details
- Born: May 2, 1901 Hamburg, German Empire
- Died: October 27, 1964 (aged 63) East Berlin, East Germany
- Resting place: Friedrichsfelde Central Cemetery
- Party: Socialist Unity Party of Germany (1946–); Communist Party of Germany (1919–1946); Spartakusbund (1917–1919)
- Awards: Patriotic Order of Merit, in Gold (1961); Banner of Labour (1960); Hans Beimler Medal (1956); Patriotic Order of Merit, in Silver (1955)
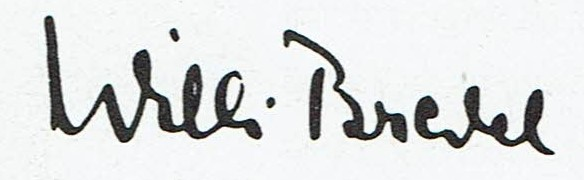
- Signature

Military service
- Allegiance: Soviet Union (1941–1945); Spanish Republic (1937–1938)
- Branch/service: People's Army of the Republic (1937–1938)
- Unit: International Brigades (1937–1938); XI International Brigade; Thälmann Battalion
- Battles/wars: Second World War; Spanish Civil War; Hamburg Uprising

Willi Bredel (2 May 1901 – 27 October 1964) was a German writer and president of the East German Academy of Arts, Berlin. Born in Hamburg, he was a pioneer of socialist realist literature.

== Life and career ==
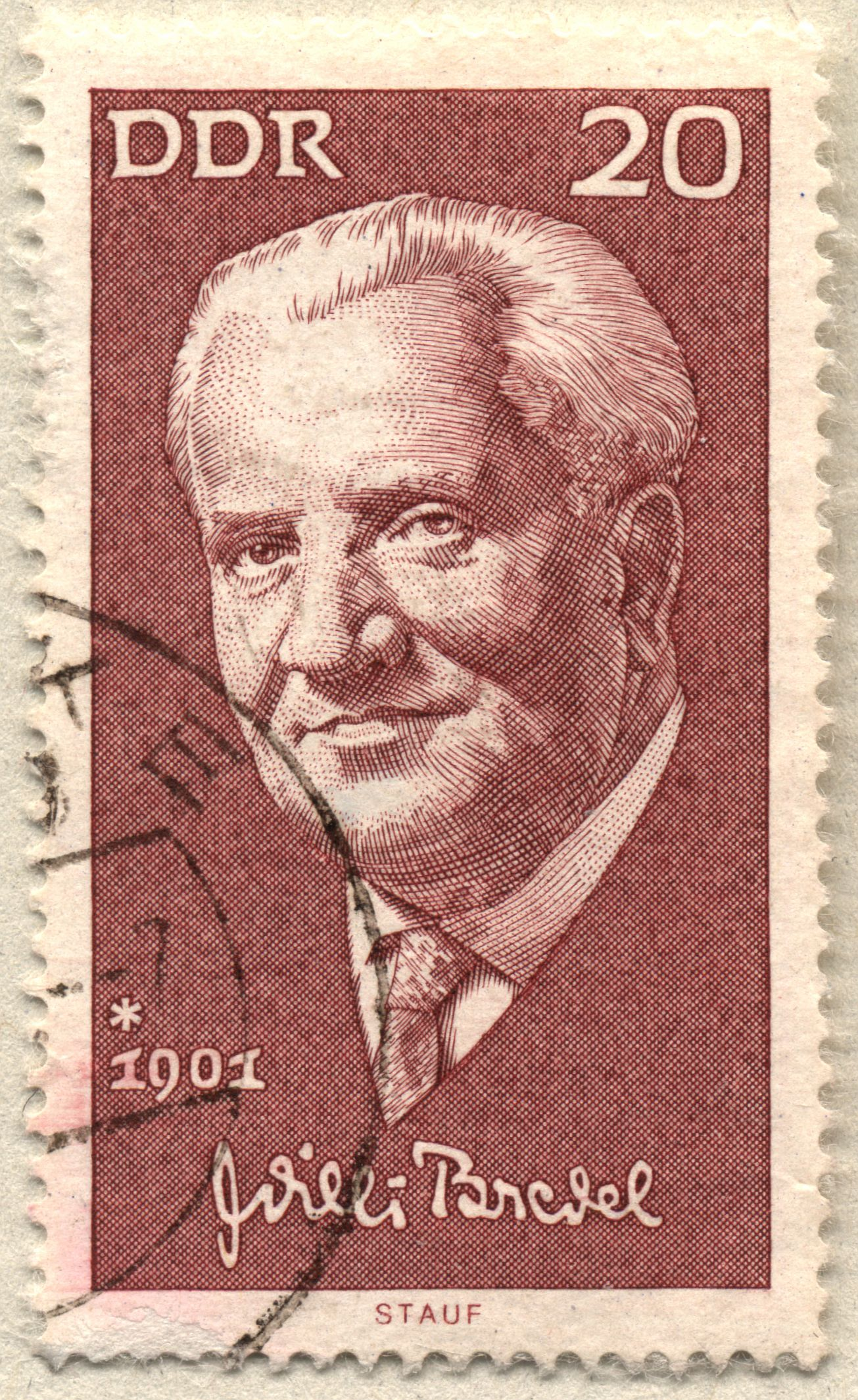
East German postage stamp of Bredel

Born into the family of a cigar maker, after graduating from primary school he became a metal worker. From 1916 to 1917 he was a member of the Socialist Worker Youth, from 1917 to 1920 of the Spartakusbund and from 1919 of the Communist Party of Germany. In 1923 he took part in the Hamburg Uprising and was sentenced to two years in prison. After his amnesty in 1925, he worked as a lathe operator in the Kampnagel factory while being the editor of various communist news outlets. For the "preparation of literary high and national treason", he was sentenced to two years imprisonment in 1930. He wrote his first novels while in custody.

Soon after the Nazis seized power in 1933, Bredel was imprisoned at Fuhlsbüttel concentration camp. He was released in spring 1934. Fleeing from Nazi Germany, he went to Czechoslovakia and then Moscow, where he lived at the Hotel Lux. He published Die Prüfung (1934), a novel describing a Nazi concentration camp, which was reprinted several times and translated into other languages. He also published accounts of his experiences in the Deutsche Zentral Zeitung, a German-language newspaper published in Moscow.

In September 1936, while in Russia during Stalin's Great Purge, Bredel participated in several sessions in which German writers examined each other's loyalty to the Communist Party. In one of his speeches, Willi Bredel described himself as "guilty" of not having examined his fellow writers' loyalty earlier and continued to publicly name seven expat German writers, questioning their loyalty. At least six of them were later murdered or died in prison.

Bredel took part in the Spanish Civil War as commissar of the Thälmann Battalion as well as the Second World War, in which he fought on the Soviet side.

His propaganda material, along with those of Walter Ulbricht and Erich Weinert, was used in an attempt to lure the 6th Army into surrendering at the Battle of Stalingrad.

After the war, he returned to Germany as part of the Sobottka Group, sent to lay the groundwork for the Soviet occupation of Mecklenburg. He later lived in East Germany and died in East Berlin.

== Awards and decorations ==
- 1955 Patriotic Order of Merit in silver
- 1956 Hans Beimler Medal
- 1960 Banner of Labor
- 1961 Patriotic Order of Merit in gold
- 1964 Burial at the Memorial of the Socialists (Friedrichsfelde Central Cemetery)

== Selected works ==
- Die Prüfung
- The Death of General Moreau and other stories
- Verwandte und Bekannte Trilogy

== See also ==
- List of German veterans of the International Brigades
