= Hans Beimler =

Hans Beimler is the name of:

- Hans Beimler (politician) (1895–1936), German Communist Party deputy who fought in the Spanish Civil War
- Hans Beimler (screenwriter) (born 1953), writer for the TV series Star Trek

== See also ==
- LEW Hennigsdorf, formerly VEB Lokomotivbau-Elektrotechnische Werke "Hans Beimler", a rail vehicle factory in Hennigsdorf, Germany
