= Dörfel =

Dörfel is a German surname. Notable people with the surname include:

- Bernd Dörfel (born 1944), German footballer, brother of Gert
- Emmy Dörfel (1908–2002), German nurse
- Friedo Dörfel (1915–1980), German footballer
- Gert Dörfel (born 1939), German footballer, brother of Bernd
