= Fritz Eikemeier =

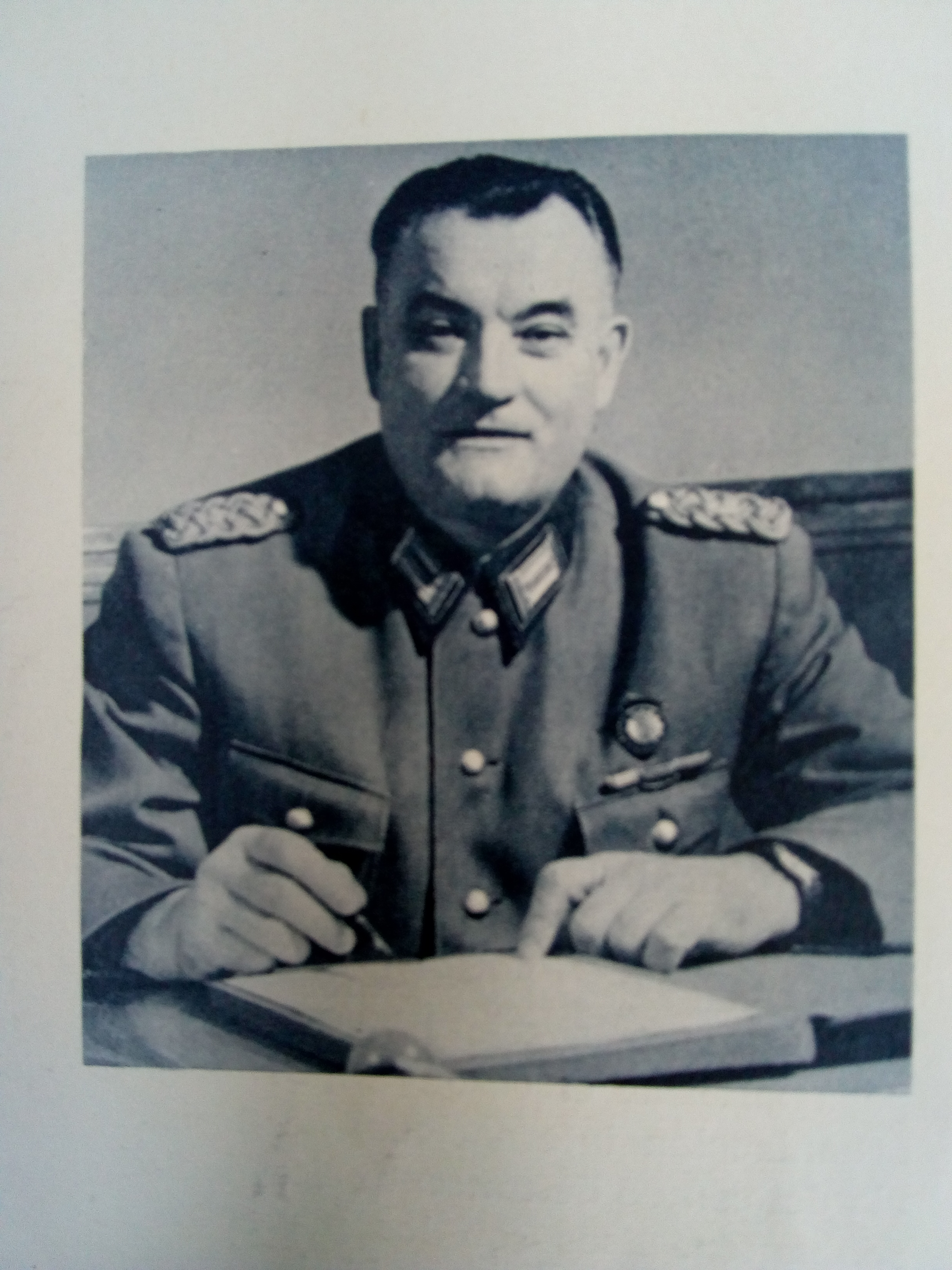
- Eikemeier in 1961
- Born: March 28, 1908; Oldendorf (Salzhemmendorf), Province of Hanover, Germany
- Died: August 4, 1985 (aged 77); East Berlin, East Germany
- Occupation: Police Chief
- Political party: KPD; SED
- Spouse: Martha

Fritz Eikemeier (28 March 1908 in Oldendorf – 4 August 1985 in East Berlin) was the Chief of Police in East Berlin between 1953 and 1964.

As a young man, he was an active member of the Communist movement, which gained him considerable experience on the receiving end of police attention. His period in office included the construction of the Berlin Wall.

== Life ==
Eikemeier was born in central Germany, in a small village some 10 km (6 miles) east of Hamelin. His father was a glass worker and, after leaving school, Fritz Eikemeier took a job in a glass factory, joining a trades union and the left-leaning Workers' Gymnastics and Sports Association in 1922. In 1926, a period of unemployment followed, after which he worked in quarrying and, later, on railroad construction. He joined the Communist Party (KPD) in 1930, becoming a local party leader. Between 1931 and 1933, he returned to working on the railways.

In 1933, the year at the start of which the NSDAP (Nazi Party) seized power in Germany, he emigrated, in August to the Netherlands, and from there to Belgium. Between 1936 and 1938, he fought as a member of the International Brigades in Spain. In November 1938, while crossing the Pyrenees, he was arrested by the French Police and interned. He was allowed to travel on to Belgium in July 1939 where he worked (illegally) for about six months. After the German army invaded Belgium in May 1940, Eikemeier was interned again, taken to France, and detained at the camp in Saint-Cyprien. In August 1940, he was found in Bordeaux by the Gestapo and arrested again. He was taken to Hanover where he spent twelve weeks in police detention before being transferred, on 23 October 1940, to the concentration camp at Sachsenhausen, a short distance to the north of Berlin.

As the Soviet army approached and national defeat loomed, plans were implemented to start emptying the Sachsenhausen concentration camp of its surviving internees and, on 20 April 1945 (which was Adolf Hitler's 56th birthday), Fritz Eikemeier was one of a group of 500 prisoners who set off on a Death march towards the Baltic ("Ostsee") Coast. Overnight on 3 May 1945, they found themselves liberated in a wood near Crivitz after their guards fled.

In Crivitz, Fritz Eikemeier met his wife, Martha, who was working there as a nurse. Four weeks later, he returned to Berlin, arriving there on 28 May 1945. On 6 June 1945 the Soviet commander installed him as police station chief in the district of Berlin-Friedenau. Soon after that, on 14 August 1945, he was promoted by the Soviet commander, now becoming Chief Inspector in Friedenau, a position which he held till July 1947. In the meantime, in 1946, he joined the country's newly formed ruling Socialist Unity Party (SED / Sozialistische Einheitspartei Deutschlands).

In Summer 1947, he was entrusted with the Personnel Department of the Berlin constabulary, later becoming is vice-commander. On 1 May 1949, the Police President, Paul Markgraf appointed Fritz Eikemeier and his comrade-colleague Alfred Schönherr as the two vice-presidents of the Berlin Police Department. Between 1949 and 1953, he was also police chief for the Brandenburg region and, within this region, from 1952, for Potsdam in succession to Richard Staimer. On 9 November 1953 it was Eikemeier who succeeded Waldemar Schmidt as Police President for East Berlin, a position he held till 20 November 1964.

Directly after the war, there had been shared opposition to the idea of a German army between the allied occupying powers. Opinion shifted in the ensuing ten years, however, and when, in 1956, the German Democratic Republic founded its own National People's Army, what emerged was a close relationship between policing and the military structures that had in some respects been fashioned out of a quasi-military East German police service. In 1956, Fritz Eikemeier already had the military rank of Major general. By August 1961, when the Berlin Wall was erected, he was on the staff of the East German National Defence Council. After he retired, in 1964, he lived in Berlin as a reserve Major general.

In addition to his police and military roles, between 1954 and 1964, Eikemeier sat as a member of the East Berlin City Council and a member of The Party's regional leadership team for Berlin.

== Awards and honours ==
- 1956 Hans Beimler Medal
- 1958 Medal for Fighters Against Fascism
- 1960 Patriotic Order of Merit
- 1964 Banner of Labor
- 1973 Patriotic Order of Merit in Gold
- 1978 Order of Karl Marx
- 1983 Patriotic Order of Merit Gold clasp
