= Kurt Lichtenstein =

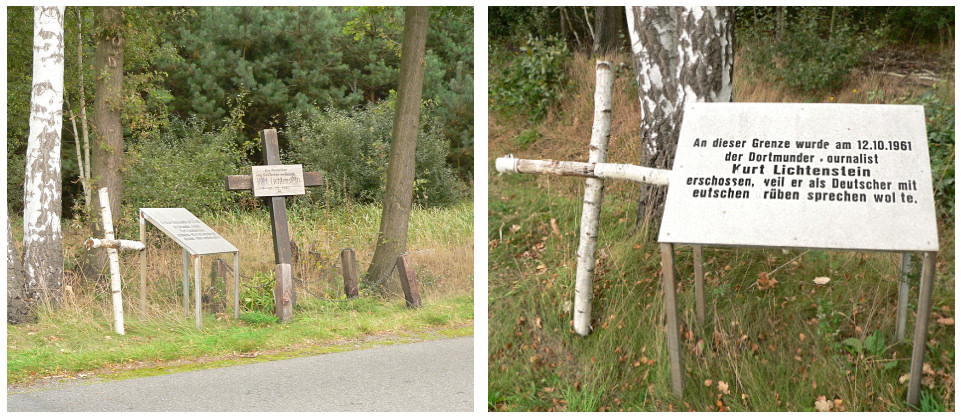
Kurt Lichtenstein memorial in Parsau, alongside the #85 Highway, where he was shot and killed

Kurt Lichtenstein (Born 1 December 1911 Berlin, Died 12 October 1961 inner German border in Klötze) was a communist journalist, and his death was a notable result of the German Democratic Republic's border control policies.

Lichtenstein was the first man shot on the inner German border after the establishment of the Berlin Wall in August 1961. The circumstances were revisited in a criminal trial in 1997. The two defendants were acquitted of manslaughter.

== Personal life ==
Kurt Lichtenstein was the son of Jewish merchant and shoemaker Georg Lichtenstein and Henriette Lichtenstein (née Haase). He grew up in Berlin in the Prenzlauer Berg district, where he attended primary and higher secondary school. He left high school to work as an errand boy at a clothing store, later training as a tool maker. Unemployed in 1932–1933, Lichtenstein emigrated for political reasons. His parents divorced in 1924, and were deported with his sister to Auschwitz concentration camp in 1941, where they are presumed to have died. In 1946, Lichtenstein married Gertrud Klapputh, an affiliate of the German Communist Party. They had two daughters, born in 1946 and 1948 and a son, born in 1947, with a daughter from Stanislaw Trabalski. Lichtenstein spent the most part of his later life as a journalist for political newspapers.

== Political life ==
At the age of 17, Liechtenstein joined the Communist Youth League (KJVD) in 1928, and by 1931 was a member of the Communist Party of Germany (KPD). In 1933, he emigrated to the Soviet Union due to racial and political persecution. After political training, Lichtenstein worked for the KJVD in the then politically autonomous Saarland. At this time he personally knew Erich Honecker. After the Saarland was annexed by Germany in 1935, he went to Paris where he was active in the communist movement, using the pseudonyms "Herbert", "Lauterbur", "Gaston Bergeaud" and "Jules Bardier".

=== Spanish Civil War and World War II ===
At the end of 1936 Lichtenstein went to Spain as an International Brigade volunteer, serving the Republic in the Spanish Civil War. Until 1937 he served in the Thälmann Battalion as a Political Commissar. At times he was involved as a journalist in the work of the Central Committee of the Communist Party of Spain. In this capacity he acted as the editor of the German edition of the International Brigade newspaper, Volontaire de la Liberté. He also worked for a Republican radio station. During the Battle of Ebro in 1938, as a member of a machine gun unit, he was wounded. In the final phase of the war he was demoted for cowardice before the enemy for his involvement in a withdrawal. After the Spanish Civil War, Lichtenstein fled to France. Due to the Second World War, the French state interned Lichtenstein in southern France in 1939 as an enemy alien. Fearing that the Vichy government would hand control of the camps to the Gestapo, Lichtenstein fled. On Communist Party instructions he joined the French Resistance in Toulouse. Also on Communist Party orders, Lichtenstein became a foreign worker in France, working using a false identity in a defense industry in Thuringia. In 1945 he was handed over to French forces and interned as a suspected Nazi. The French Communist Party intervened to free him, and he returned to Germany.

=== Post-War ===
After the Second World War Lichtenstein worked in the Ruhr for the Communist Party. He was a journalist for several communist-oriented newspapers. He also edited the Neuen Volkszeitung (New People's Daily). Between 1947 and 1950 he was a Communist Party member of the state parliament of North Rhine-Westphalia. During inner-party purges in 1950, he was associated with the disgrace and fall of Kurt Müller. In 1953 Lichtenstein was expelled for anti-party activities and dismissed as chief editor of the Neuen Volkszeitung. For several years he worked odd jobs. He joined the German Socialist Party (SPD). In 1958 he received a journalistic appointment to the SPD-oriented Westfälische Rundschau which appeared in Dortmund.

== Death ==
In October 1961 Lichtenstein was reporting on the inner German border. He wanted to travel the entire inner German border to report on the situation two months after the construction of the Berlin Wall. Lichtenstein began his trip in Lübeck in a red car, and by 12 October 1961 was in Wolfsburg in Lower Saxony. Around noon he reported to a border post in Brome-Zicherie. He followed county road 85, along the border, towards the Parsau Kaiser angle. At 6.5 kilometers (4 miles), he talked with members of a LPG Brigade on German Democratic Republic (East German) territory. He crossed the shallow border ditch and the 10 meter (30') wide border control strip. Two border guards hailed him. As Lichtenstein was running in the direction of the Federal Republic of Germany (West Germany), the border guards shot him with submachine guns. Lichtenstein's body was in the border ditch, with one fifth of his body located on the Western side of the border. East German border guards transported him to a hospital, where he died. His body was cremated, and the ashes returned to his widow by post.

In October 1961 a funeral service took place in Dortmund. The German Federal Republic's minister for All German Affairs, Ernst Lemmer, and the SPD member Herbert Wehner, were amongst the mourners.

=== Aftermath ===
The Lichtenstein border incident occurred during a period of high Cold War tension. The death was used politically by Western and Eastern powers. In the West, press and government reacted with outrage and disgust, and Lichtenstein was converted into a martyr. For the East this appeared to be a provoking border incident. The Socialist Unity Party (SED) central newspaper Neues Deutschland (New Germany) carried the headline, "Provocateur violates the state border of the GDR."

Despite eyewitness accounts of the incident from both East and West Germans, rumors abounded that Lichtenstein had been killed for other reasons. Alternate theories of Lichtenstein's death have focused on his earlier political work with and his departure from the German Communist Party.

In late 1961, a memorial was erected to Lichtenstein near the place of his death. The memorial consisted of a cross and an explanatory sign that read "Ein Deutscher, von Deutschen erschossen Kurt Lichtenstein † 12.10.1961" (A German, shot dead by Germans, Kurt Lichtenstein 12.10.1961) The memorial became a place of political demonstration. Other signs were erected on the site, with messages that framed the shooting as a deliberate murder. In 1962, the memorial was the site of a large demonstration.

The incident was revisited in the 1990s, and the border guard who had shot Lichtenstein stood trial for homicide. In 1997, the shooter was acquitted on the grounds that he was following orders and had no intent to kill.
