= Freiheit (song) =

Song
- Language: German
- English title: Freedom
- Written: 1936
- Songwriter(s): Gudrun Kabisch and Paul Dessau

"Freiheit", also known as "Spaniens Himmel" or "Die Thälmann-Kolonne", is a song written in 1936 by Gudrun Kabisch and Paul Dessau, German anti-fascists. The song was written for the International Brigades but later became a popular standard in Germany and in American communist and folk music communities. The title translates as "Freedom" in English.

== Background ==
The song was written as an anthem for the German volunteers who made up the Thälmann Battalion of the International Brigades and was originally named "The Thaelman Column" ("Die Thälmann-Kolonne" or "Spaniens Himmel" (Spanish Skies) in German). Composer Dessau and lyricist Kabisch, husband and wife, composed the song while living in exile in Paris and used the pseudonyms Peter Daniels and Paul Ernst, names that still appear on printed versions of the lyrics.

Musically a march, the lyrics of the song make reference to the struggle of the anti-Franco fighters and to a more general struggle for the idea of "freedom". The fight in Spain is put in the context of the universal struggle against fascism, with the chorus making direct reference to the situation in Germany during the period of Nazism. The chorus can be paraphrased as "Home is faraway, but we are ready/We fight and win for you: freedom!"

== Lyrics ==
English-language lyrics to "Freiheit" from a 1951 Canadian songbook.

Spaniens Himmel breitet seine Sterne
Über unsre Schützengraben aus;
Und der Morgen grüßt schon aus der Ferne,
Bald geht es zum neuen Kampf hinaus.

Chorus
Die Heimat ist weit,
Doch wir sind bereit,
Wir kämpfen und siegen für dich:
Freiheit!

Dem Faschisten werden wir nicht weichen,
Schickt er auch die Kugeln hageldicht.
Mit uns stehen Kameraden ohne gleichen
Und ein Rückwärts gibt es für uns nicht.

Chorus
Die Heimat ist weit,
Doch wir sind bereit,
Wir kämpfen und siegen für dich:
Freiheit!

Rührt die Trommel. Fällt die Bajonette.
Vorwärts marsch. Der Sieg ist unser Lohn.
Mit der roten Fahne brecht die Kette.
Auf zum Kampf das Thälmann Bataillon.

Chorus
Die Heimat ist weit,
Doch wir sind bereit,
Wir kämpfen und siegen für dich:
Freiheit!

The final chorus in the Ernst Busch version alternatively gives the line Wir kämpfen und sterben für dich: Freiheit! in contrast to kämpfen und siegen given in the rest of the song. It also features a closing verse in Spanish:

Mi tierra dejé
A España juré
que ella siempre será
¡Libre!

== Versions ==
The song was popularized among German fighters in Spain by singer and International Brigades member Ernst Busch and later became something of an unofficial anthem of the GDR. Busch's recording of the song was later popularized in North America after it was released as a track on the three-record set, "Six Songs for Democracy" by Keynote Records starting in 1938. It was later recorded by Pete Seeger and became part of Seeger's live repertoire.

The song was sung as a dirge by the dissident musician Wolf Biermann as a parodic critique of "the stagnation of the socialist ideal" in the GDR of the 1960s and 1970s.

Year	Title	Performer	Genre	Label	Catalog #
1938	Six Songs for Democracy	Ernst Busch and chorus	Folk	Keynote	101
1961	Songs Of The Spanish Civil War, Vol. 1: Songs Of The Lincoln Brigade, Six Songs For Democracy	Pete Seeger and Group & Ernst Busch and Chorus	Folk	Folkways	FH 5436
1968	Wimoweh And Other Songs Of Freedom And Protest	Pete Seeger	Folk	Folkways	FTS 31018
1976	Es Gibt Ein Leben Vor Dem Tod	Wolf Biermann	Folk	CBS	CBS 81 259
1977	Hannes Wader singt Arbeiterlieder	Hannes Wader	Folk	Philips	6305 342

== Appearances ==
=== In other media ===
- The song is part of the soundtrack of the 1955 film Ernst Thälmann - Führer seiner Klasse, a biopic of communist leader Ernst Thälmann, and plays over a montage of scenes set during the war in Spain.
- The song plays as the outro to the February 25, 2018 episode of the podcast Chapo Trap House, "Episode 188: Menaker Facts Stated feat. Daniel Menaker." Menaker, father of co-host Will Menaker, refers to it as a favorite song of his red diaper upbringing.

== See also ==
- List of socialist songs
