= Jules Dumont =

French militant Communist

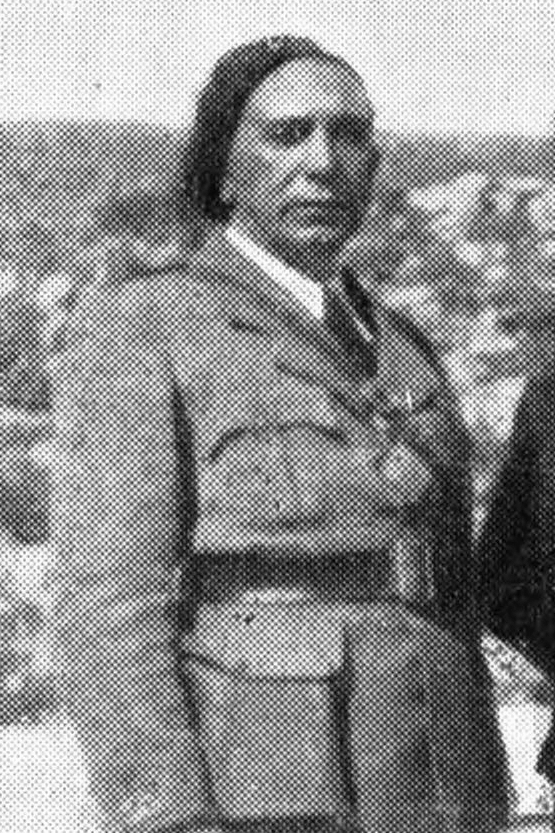
- Dumont in Spain, 1937
- Born: January 1, 1888; Roubaix, French Third Republic
- Died: June 15, 1943 (aged 55); Fort Mont-Valérien, Suresnes, German-occupied France
- Military career
- Allegiance: (Spain) Second Spanish Republic; France
- Branch: Spanish Republican Army; French Army
- Service years: 1936–1939; 1914–1919 & 1909–1911
- Rank: Lieutenant colonel
- Units: 35th Division (1937–1939) & 11th Division (1937); XI International Brigade; Commune de Paris Battalion; Armée d'Orient
- Commands: Commune de Paris Battalion
- Conflicts: Second World War; Spanish Civil War; First World War; Macedonian front; Second Franco-Moroccan War
- Awards: Knight of the Legion of Honour; Croix de Guerre 1914–1918; Morocco Commemorative Medal

Jules Dumont (French pronunciation: [ʒyl dymɔ̃]) (January 1888 – 15 June 1943) was a French militant communist. He fought in the Spanish Civil War, commanding the Commune de Paris Battalion, XI International Brigade. He was active in the French Resistance in the Second World War. Arrested by the Gestapo, he was shot at Suresnes (Fort du Mont-Valérien), near Paris, on 15 June 1943.
