= Vinzent Porombka =

- Born: 2 January 1910; Zabrze, Upper Silesia, Germany
- Died: 28 November 1975 (aged 65); Berlin, East Germany
- Occupations: Communist activist Party functionary
- Political party: KPD; SED
- Parent(s): Vinzent Porombka (1884-1945); Agnes Bednorz/Porombka (1888-)

Vinzent Porombka (2 January 1910 – 28 November 1975) was a German Communist political activist who became a party official, a member of the International Brigades in the Spanish Civil War, and an active participant in resistance to Nazism. In his later years he became a party functionary in the German Democratic Republic.

== Life ==
=== Early years ===
Porombka was born in Zabrze, a substantial conurbation east of Breslau and close to Kattowitz. His father, also called Vinzent Porombka, was a miner who would end his life as a murder victim in the Groß-Rosen concentration camp. Long before that, when Vinzent Porombka was aged 4, the First World War broke out. Less than a year after that Zabrze was renamed as "Hindenburg", to honour the German military commander on the Eastern front who had recently received much public adulation following his victory at Tannenberg. Porombka was still a child during the period of revolutionary turmoil that followed German defeat in the war. He later obtained a job as a dairy worker in 1925/26, and then worked as a miner from 1926 till 1930. After 1930 several years of part-time working alternating with unemployment ensued.

=== Political activism ===
In 1927 he joined the Roter Frontkämpferbund (RFB / Red Front Fighters' League) and in 1930, the year of his twentieth birthday, the Young Communists. In 1931 he was sentenced to ten months imprisonment for Breach of the peace. 1933, a year of regime change in Germany, started with the Nazi Party taking power in January. They lost little time in establishing a one-party dictatorship. Membership of political parties (other than of the Nazi Party) became illegal. 1933 was the year in which Vinzent Porombka joined the Communist Party, and by March he was back in jail. In June he was transferred to the newly opened Esterwegen concentration camp. He was released in December.

After his release he continued with his illegal party activity, becoming the Communist Party's local leader for the Beuthen sub-district. He also worked as an instructor with the Young Communists. In August 1935 his political activities in Upper Silesia came to an end when he fled to Czechoslovakia, where he based himself just across the border, in Steinau, and supported himself as a stone worker. He also undertook "border work" for The Party in nearby Karvin and Ostrava. In July 1936 he was arrested, but he managed to escape, while being deported to Germany, and ended up spending a further three months working illegally in Czechoslovakia.

=== Fighting Fascism ===
From November 1936 Porombka was participating in the Spanish Civil War as a member of the XIIIth Dabrowski Brigade. He also became a member of the Spanish Communist Party. At the start of 1939 he was involved in fighting in North Catalonia where he left a bag with a comrade who was killed shortly afterwards. The Francoist soldiers found his bag with the body of the dead comrade, and inside the bag they found Porombka's Red Aid membership card which included his home address and photograph. The papers found their way back to Condor Legion (which was sponsored by the German government), and from there the erroneous message was passed to the Gestapo that "Red Porombka" from the Rokittnitz quarter of Hindenburg (formerly known as Zabrze) in Upper Silesia had been killed: as far as the German authorities were concerned he was now dead. He was nevertheless interned in France between February and June 1939, after which he succeeded in being relocated to the Soviet Union in a "medical evacuation".

He began his new life in the Soviet Union as a lathe operator at the tractor plant in Chelyabinsk. In 1942 he was drafted into the Labor army (Трудовая армия). By the end of 1942 he had been enrolled on a special parachutists' course in Moscow. Porombka used this training on 27 April 1943 when he was the designated radio operator in a three-man team parachuted into Germany, landing near Insterburg (then in East Prussia). Their mission involved establishing contact with ant-Nazi resistance members in Germany. It was left to Porombka to report back on the operation. He reported that the other two, Otto Heppner and Adolf Kaim, had failed to complete their part in the mission.

Still in Germany, he was able to visit his parents in May 1943. Since he had been reported killed in the Spanish Civil War back in 1939 they must have been delighted to see him, but they had to tell him that two of his younger brothers had by this stage been killed in the fighting. Unfortunately the Gestapo also became aware that he was still alive, and they put his parents in concentration camps. In 1945 his father was murdered in the Groß-Rosen concentration camp.

Following his instructions from the Communist Party Central Committee, Porombla had made his way to Upper Silesia where he made contact with local party members. Together they worked to expand anti-Nazi resistance in the area and to expand cooperation with Polish resistance movements to the east. Relations with the large resistance group in Ruda, headed up by a Communist called Rudolf Krzyszczyk, were close, and involved a particular focus on disrupting German army transport. Krzyszczyk's arrest early in 1944 placed Porombla in greatly increased danger. The Gestapo launched a search for him and circulated a "wanted" sheet to party locations. He was obliged to change his radioing habits. Despite his extensive network of contacts he was unable to find a safe hiding place. In order to avoid endangering his comrades he therefore moved his base out of Silesia, across into (formerly) Czechoslovak territory. He now got rid of his radio transmitter for some time, and in July 1944 fled to Ratibor and Ostrava.

=== End of the war ===
By the time the war ended, formally in May 1945, he had been able to return to Upper Silesia and to resume radio contact with Moscow. Of the many agents parachuted into Germany by the Soviets during the war, Vinzent Porombka was unusual in having survived till the end of the fighting. His hometown of Hindenburg being in the east of the country, the Red army arrived on 26 January 1945. By that time Porombka had been back in Upper Silesia for several weeks, working with the illegal regional Communist Party under the leadership of a man called Roman Ligendza. At the end of January he was received by the Soviet military commander and worked with the new municipal administration. A couple of months later, however, in March 1945, Ligendza and Porombka were parachuted into Chemnitz, further to the west in Germany.

The end of the war marked the end of Nazi Germany. Vinzent Porombka made his new life in what had been the central part of Germany and was now the Soviet occupation zone. In mid-1945 he was working for the Red Army General Staff as a simultaneous translator, before relocating to the western occupation zones where for a few months he worked for the (no longer illegal) Communist Party. In 1946 he returned to the Soviet occupation zone and joined the newly formed Socialist Unity Party of Germany (SED / Sozialistische Einheitspartei Deutschlands). The SED was the result of a contentious political merger, presented as a consolidation of the previously split political left, but after a couple of years former members of the (more moderately left-wing) SPD had been excluded from positions of influence with varying levels of persuasion. By the time, formally in October 1949, that the Soviet occupation zone became the German Democratic Republic, the new SED had come to be seen by many as the old Communist Party with a new name. From May 1946 Porombka was working as a courier and transport supervisor for the Soviet authorities. In 1950 he started to work in the "General Department" of the Central Secretariat, and was also employed in the new country's important Party Central Committee.

In 1970 he reached his 60th birthday. This was the year in which he resigned his Party Central Committee duties on health grounds.

== Awards and honours ==
- 1955: Patriotic Order of Merit in silver
- 1956: Hans Beimler Medal (for service in the Spanish Civil War)
- 1965: Patriotic Order of Merit in gold
- 1970: Order of the Patriotic War (Soviet honour)
