= Robert Garland Colodny =

American professor, historian, and anti-fascist

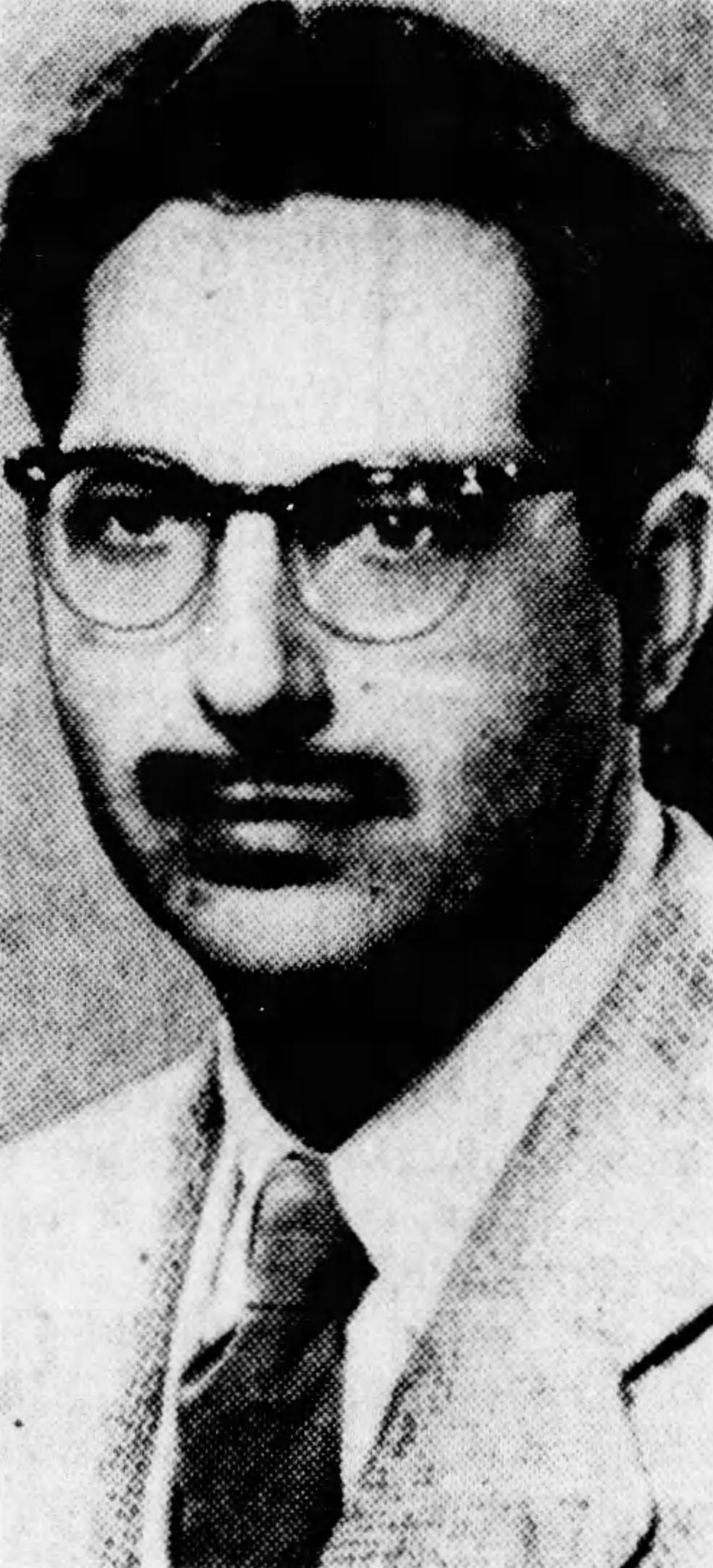
- Colodny c. 1961
- Born: August 5, 1915; Phoenix, Arizona, U.S.
- Died: March 21, 1997 (aged 81); Pittsburgh, Pennsylvania, U.S.
- Education: University of California, Berkeley
- Known for: Abraham Lincoln Brigade
- Spouse: Helen Bobbye (Beatrice) Suckle (m. 1939; div. 1940) Dorothy Newman (m. 1946, died) Margaret Simon Yeager (before 1997)
- Children: 1
- Military career
- Allegiance: Spanish Republic
- Branch: International Brigades
- Service years: 1937–1938
- Unit: The "Abraham Lincoln" XV International Brigade
- Conflicts: Spanish Civil War; Battle of Brunete (WIA)

Robert Garland Colodny (August 5, 1915 – March 21, 1997) was an American professor, historian, and anti-fascist. He was one of nearly 3,000 American volunteers who joined the Abraham Lincoln Brigade and fought in the Spanish Civil War. He was severely wounded in action in the summer of 1937, and returned to the United States. He later joined the US Army in 1941 and was stationed in the Aleutian Islands in Alaska, along with novelist Dashiell Hammett, where together they wrote and published a newspaper for US troops, The Adakian. In 1943, he co-authored The Battle of the Aleutians with Hammett, under the direction of an infantry intelligence officer, Major Henry W. Hall.

Colodny was a historian and professor, who earned his doctorate from the University of California, Berkeley in 1950, with a dissertation on the Spanish Civil that was published in 1958 as The Struggle for Madrid. He later became a professor of history at the University of Pittsburgh, where he chaired the newly formed Center for the History and Philosophy of Science, and contributed enormously to its growth and development, while co-editing several books with his colleagues and other leading scholars and savants. He also continued to write about the history of Spain and the ongoing struggle against fascism, at home and abroad.

In 1962, Colodny was publicly accused of being a Communist sympathizer by a Pennsylvania State Representative, John T. Walsh, for Colodny's statements in support of the Cuban Revolution. Colodny had to appear before the House Un-American Activities Committee (HUAC), where he was eventually cleared. Colodny continued to teach at the University of Pittsburgh, retiring in 1984. His investigation by HUAC was considered to be "one of the last anti-Communist investigations in the nation's history".

Colodny was a member of the Veterans of the Abraham Lincoln Brigades (VALB) and served on their historical preservation committee, as well as contributing articles to their publication. In 1967, VALB printed 20,000 copies of a pamphlet that Colodny had written called Spain and Vietnam which expressed opposition to the Vietnam War through a comparison to the Spanish Civil War; some copies were even smuggled into then-Francoist Spain.

Although he was not German, in 1970 Colodny was a recipient of the Hans Beimler Medal from the German Democratic Republic (East Germany), an honor usually awarded to East Germans who fought in the Spanish Civil War on the side of the Republicans.

Colodny was one of the original twenty-nine sponsors of the Fair Play for Cuba Committee, along with many other notable American intellectuals and writers. This led to a campaign to get him removed from his job, which ultimately failed due to his repute among his colleagues.

== Personal life ==
Colodny was the son of Isidor (or Isidorus) Omar Colodny, who like him was also a professor and educator. Isidor was a Jewish immigrant originally from Belarus, but often claimed to have been born in Vermont (where he grew up) on various papers. Colodny's mother was Pauline Isabel Shenberg Colodny, born in New Haven, Connecticut to Ukrainian-Jewish immigrants from the Odesa region. Colodny had two older siblings. The family had moved from New Jersey to Arizona circa 1913 in an effort to seek a better climate for Pauline's worsening pulmonary tuberculosis; however, Pauline died in Southern California in 1923, when Colodny was a child.

Colodny was married three times. His first was a short-lived marriage to Helen Bobbye (Beatrice) Suckle, later the wife of United Nations information officer César Ortiz Tinoco (who was later the husband of British food writer Elisabeth Lambert Ortiz). He then married Dorothy Newman in 1946, with whom he had one child. His final marriage was to Margaret Simon Yeager.

Colodny's papers are preserved at New York University.
