= Ludwig Renn =

German author (1889–1979)

- Ludwig Renn in 1955
- Born: Arnold Friedrich Vieth von Golßenau; 22 April 1889; Dresden, German Empire
- Died: 21 July 1979 (aged 90); East Berlin, German Democratic Republic
- Resting place: Zentralfriedhof Friedrichsfelde
- Occupations: Author, Soldier
- Political party: Communist Party of Germany (1928–1947); Socialist Unity Party (1947–)
- Military Service
- Allegiance: (Spain) Second Spanish Republic; German Empire
- Branch: Spanish Republican Army; Imperial German Army
- Service years: 1936–1937; 1911–1918
- Units: 35th Division; XII International Brigade; Thälmann Battalion
- Conflicts: Spanish Civil War; Battle of Guadalajara; Battle of Brunete; First World War; Western Front

Ludwig Renn (born Arnold Friedrich Vieth von Golßenau; 22 April 1889 – 21 July 1979) was a German author. Born a Saxon nobleman, he later became a committed communist and lived in East Berlin.

== Youth and the First World War ==
Ludwig Renn was the assumed name of Arnold Friedrich Vieth von Golßenau who was born into a noble Saxon family whose family seat was in Golßen (Niederlausitz). He adopted the name Ludwig Renn in 1930, after becoming a communist, renouncing his noble title and taking the name of the hero of his first successful novel, Krieg (1928). His mother, Bertha, maiden name Raspe (1867 – 1949) was the daughter of a Moscow apothecary, whilst his father, Carl Johann Vieth von Golßenau (1856 – 1938), was a teacher of mathematics and physics at the Royal Court of Saxony in Dresden. Through him, Ludwig Renn came to know the Crown Prince of Saxony, Prince Friedrich August Georg von Sachsen (1865 – 1932), later King Friedrich August III, who was destined to be the last King of Saxony after the 1918 Revolution.

From 1911 Renn served as an officer in a prestigious Saxon Guards Regiment, where he served under his friend Prince Friedrich August. Between 1914 and 1918 he fought in the First World War as a company commander, and a field battalion commander on the Western Front. His first book, Krieg (War), which appeared in 1928 brought him wide acclaim. After the war he was a captain in the Dresden security police, a paramilitary force set up during the Weimar Republic. In 1920 during the Kapp Putsch, Renn refused to open fire upon striking workers and left the police service shortly afterwards. This is recounted in the novel Nachkrieg (1930) but confirmed as a fact by some sources.

== Studies and travels ==
From 1920 to 1923 Renn studied law, economics, history of art and Russian philology in Göttingen and Munich. In 1923 he worked as an art dealer in Dresden during the time of hyperinflation.

During 1925 and 1926 Renn undertook a journey on foot through Europe and the Near East. In 1927 he undertook further studies in archaeology, art history and Chinese history in Vienna, returning to Germany in the same year to give lectures to workers on the history of China and Russia at the Volkshochschule Zwickau. In Vienna in 1927 he had witnessed dozens of socialist demonstrators being attacked and killed by police and thereafter turned to the left and ultimately communism.

== Renn as a Communist writer and soldier in Spain ==
In 1928, the year in which he published Krieg, Renn became a member of the Communist Party of Germany, a step which the novel Nachkrieg (1930) reflects. In the same year he joined the Roter Frontkämpferbund (‘Alliance of Red Front-Fighters’) and from 1928 to 1932 was secretary of the Alliance of Proletarian-Revolutionary Writers in Berlin (BPRS). Renn was editor of the communist journal, Linkskurve and the communist military police journal, Aufbruch. His work for the BPRS brought him into close contact with, amongst others, Anna Seghers and Johannes R Becher.

Renn's growing commitment to communism saw him travel to the USSR in 1929 and 1930. Renn found himself increasingly under attack from the National Socialists and decided to renounce his noble title in 1930, adopting the name of the protagonist of his novel, Krieg: Ludwig Renn. Between 1931 and 1932 he was a lecturer on the history of warfare and military theory at the Marxist Workers’ School (MASCH) in Berlin. His books Nachkrieg (1930) and Rußlandfahrten (1932) made him the most important German communist writer of the inter-war period.

In 1933, following the burning of the Reichstag, new laws designed to accelerate Adolf Hitler’s rise to power were passed, leading to Renn, Carl von Ossietzky and Ernst Torgler being arrested together in January 1934. Renn was sentenced to 30 months imprisonment, serving 18 months.

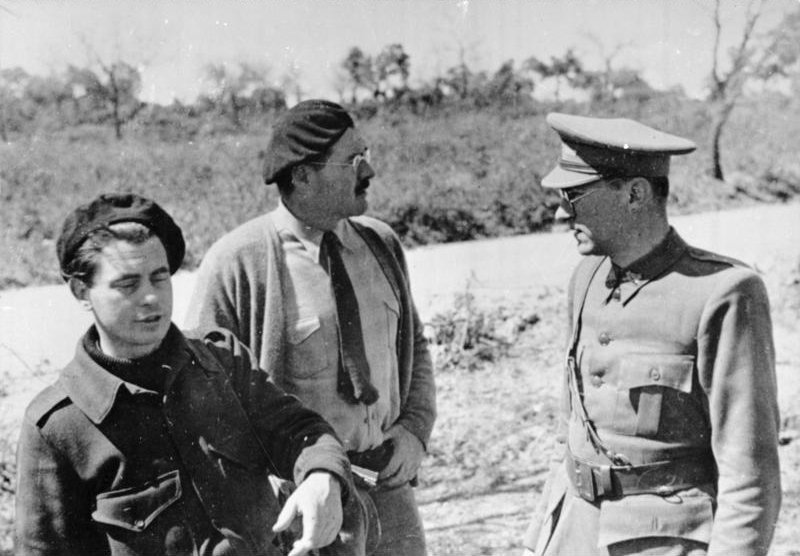
Ludwig Renn (right), International Brigade officer, with Dutch filmmaker Joris Ivens and Ernest Hemingway (centre). 1937

On his release in August 1935, he travelled to Spain where in July 1936 he joined the International Brigades in support of the Spanish Republican cause, becoming Chief of Staff for Lieutenant Colonel Hans Kahle in the XI International Brigade and the 35th Division. He was in Madrid in November 1936 writing training booklets for the military command as the city became increasingly under threat. He was driven out of the city to Cuenca by Claud Cockburn, a British communist journalist, under orders from the government and their Russian advisors. In November 1936 he became leader of the Thälmann Battalion of the XII International Brigade, fighting in the Battle of Guadalajara in March 1937 and then in the Battle of Brunete. In July 1937 he attended the Second International Writers' Congress, the purpose of which was to discuss the attitude of intellectuals to the war, held in Valencia, Barcelona and Madrid and attended by many writers including André Malraux, Ernest Hemingway, Stephen Spender and Pablo Neruda. In August 1937 he was sent on a pro-Republican propaganda tour to the United States. During his service in Spain he spent time with Ernest Hemingway. He wrote an account of his time in his work, Der spanische Krieg (1955), but was unable to name Hemingway, referring to him only as 'an American', because of the ideological condemnation of Hemingway's work in the GDR at the time.

== Exile and return to Germany ==
After the defeat of the Spanish Republicans, Renn escaped to France and then travelled into exile to Mexico, where he remained from 1939 to 1947 and served as president of the Free Germany movement (Freies Deutschland). During this time he promoted the use of the internationalist language Esperanto and the Ludwig Renn Archive at the Academy of the Arts, Berlin, holds several of his translations into Esperanto from foreign languages.

In 1947 he returned to Germany, settling once more in Dresden, which was at the time in the Soviet Occupation Zone and from 1949 part of the GDR. Here he was director of the Kulturwissenschaftliches Institut and held a chair in anthropology at the Dresden Technical University from 1947 to 1951.

From 1952 Renn lived in East Berlin, where he was a freelance writer and a member of the German Academy of the Arts. He also worked as a Spanish–German translator.

== Importance ==
Renn was one of the founders of proletarian‒revolutionary literature in Germany. His most important achievement lay in his novels, which were largely autobiographical in nature, and served to document the turbulent times in which he lived.

The novel Krieg was an international success. Here, Renn was amongst the first to depict the harsh reality of life on the Western Front for the ordinary soldier. Although the protagonist was a simple soldier and Renn in fact an officer, much of the novel reflects autobiographical concerns. Its sequel, Nachkrieg (1930) shows the same character living in a postwar period of intense political conflict and growing in socialist conviction.

Renn wrote directly about his own life in the work Adel im Untergang (Mexico 1947, Berlin 1947), as well as other works in the following decades. His final work, published posthumously in 1980, was an autobiography (Anstöße in meinem Leben). As well as novels, travel writing and memoirs, Renn also wrote imaginative works for children and young people.

== Private life ==
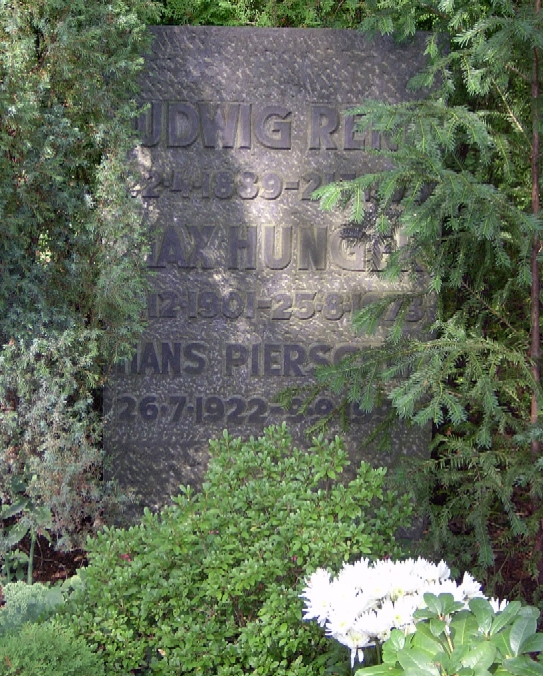
Ludwig Renn's grave in Berlin

On his return from exile in Mexico in 1947 Renn settled at first in Dresden with his partner Max Hunger (1901–1973). In 1949 they were joined by Hans Pierschel (1922–1994) and the three men then moved in 1952 to Berlin-Kaulsdorf where they lived together for the rest of their lives. After Renn's death, he was cremated and honoured with an Ehrengrab in Berlin's Friedrichsfelde Cemetery. Hunger and Pierschel are buried with Renn in the same grave.

== Works ==
- Krieg. Originally published by the Frankfurter Societäts-Druckerei, Frankfurt am Main 1928. Current edition, Aufbau Verlag, Berlin & Weimar 2014. ISBN 978-3351035587
- In vorderster Linie. Aus der Aisne-Champagne-Schlacht 1917. Diesterweg, 1929
- Nachkrieg. Agis Verlag, Berlin 1930; Current edition Das Neue Berlin, 2004. ISBN 978-3360012463
- Russlandfahrten. Lasso Verlag, Berlin 1932
- Vor großen Wandlungen. Oprecht, Zürich 1936. New edition: Aufbau-Verlag, Berlin & Weimar 1989. ISBN 3-351-01478-3
- Adel im Untergang. Editorial „El Libro Libre“, Mexico 1944. Current edition, Aufbau-Verlag, Berlin & Weimar 1992; digital edition (may have territorial limitation) Aufbau Digital ISBN 978-3-8412-0727-2
- Morelia. Eine Universitätsstadt in Mexiko. Illustrated by Martin Hänisch. Aufbau-Verlag, Berlin & Weimar 1950
- Vom alten und neuen Rumänien. Illustrated by Martin Hänisch. Aufbau-Verlag, Berlin & Weimar 1952
- Trini. Die Geschichte eines Indianerjungen. Kinderbuchverlag, Illustrated by Kurt Zimmermann. Kinderbuchverlag, Berlin 1954. (Nationalpreis der DDR, 1955). Special illustrated edition: Trini. Die Geschichte eines indianischen Landarbeiter-Jungen während der mexikanischen Revolution with illustrations by Diego Rivera and Alfaro Siqueiros. Weismann Verlag, Munich 1973. ISBN 978-3921040164
- Der spanische Krieg. Aufbau, Berlin 1955. Current unabridged edition from the manuscript, Verlag Das Neue Berlin 2006. ISBN 978-3360012876
- Der Neger Nobi. (Book for children) Kinderbuchverlag, Berlin 1955. Since the 8th edition in 1962 this work has gone by the title Nobi. Current edition: Eulenspiegelverlag, Berlin 2001. ISBN 978-3359014270
- Herniu und der blinde Asni. Illustrated by Kurt Zimmermann. Kinderbuchverlag, Berlin 1956
- Krieg ohne Schlacht. Verlag der Nation, Berlin 1957
- Meine Kindheit und Jugend. Aufbau-Verlag, Berlin & Weimar 1957
- Herniu und Armin. Illustrated by Kurt Zimmermann. Kinderbuchverlag, Berlin 1958
- Auf den Trümmern des Kaiserreiches. Illustrated by Paul Rosié. Kinderbuchverlag, Berlin 1961
- Camilo. Children's book illustrated by Kurt Zimmermann. Kinderbuchverlag, Berlin 1963
- Inflation. Aufbau-Verlag, Berlin & Weimar 1963
- Zu Fuss zum Orient. Aufbau-Verlag, Berlin & Weimar 1966 (1981)
- Ausweg. Aufbau-Verlag, Berlin & Weimar 1967
- Krieger, Landsknecht und Soldat. With Helmut Schnitter, Children's book illustrated by Klaus Segner. Der Kinderbuchverlag, Aufbau-Verlag, Berlin & Weimar 1973
- In Mexiko. Aufbau-Verlag, Berlin & Weimar 1979
- Anstöße in meinem Leben. Aufbau-Verlag, Berlin & Weimar 1980, posthumously published Autobiography

== Works in English ==
- War. Translated from the German by Willa and Edwin Muir. New York: H. Fertig, 1988. (1929)
- After War. Translated from the German by Willa and Edwin Muir. New York: Dodd, Mead & Company, 1931
- Death without Battle. New York: Dodd, Mead & Company, 1937 / London: M. Secker & Warburg, 1937
- Warfare. The Relation of War to Society. Oxford University Press, New York 1939 / Faber & Faber, London, 1939

== Awards ==
- Ministry of Culture of the GDR: Awards for his children books
- 1955: National Prize of the GDR Second Class
- 1961: National Prize of the GDR First Class
- 1969: Karl Marx Order
- 1979: Grand Star of People's Friendship in Gold (German: Großer Stern der Völkerfreundschaft in Gold). Awarded in celebration of Renn’s 90th Birthday on 1 May 1979
- 1969–1975 Honorary President of the Academy of Arts, Berlin

== Literature ==
Albrecht, Kai-Britt, Renn, Ludwig, in Neue Deutsche Biographie (NDB), Vol. 21. Berlin: Duncker & Humblot (2003) pp. 426–428. ISBN 3-428-11202-4 (Digital version)

Böttcher, Kurt, et al., Eds., Lexikon deutschsprachiger Schriftsteller: 20. Jahrhundert. Hildesheim: Georg Olms Verlag (1993), pp. 598–600. ISBN 3-487-09611-0

Garland, Henry and Mary, Eds., Oxford Companion to German Literature. Oxford: Oxford University Press (1986), pp. 740–741. ISBN 0-19-866139-8

== See also ==
- Exilliteratur
