= Ewald Munschke =

German politician (1901–1981)

Head of the Cadre Affairs Department of the Central Committee
- In office 1950–1952
- Secretary: Walter Ulbricht
- Preceded by: Philipp Daub
- Succeeded by: Josef Stadler

Personal details
- Born: 20 March 1901 Berlin, Kingdom of Prussia, German Empire
- Died: 21 October 1981 (aged 80) East Berlin, East Germany
- Party: KPD; SED
- Occupation: Military General; Politician

Ewald Munschke (born and died Berlin: 20 March 1901 – 21 October 1981) was a General in the East German quasi-military Kasernierte Volkspolizei (People's Police in Barracks) and subsequently one of the creators of the National People's Army.

Between 1930 and 1945, he was a member of the German Communist Party and actively engaged in resisting National Socialism.

== Life ==
=== Early years ===
Ewald Munschke was born into a working-class family in Berlin a few weeks after the start of the twentieth century. His father was a stonemason and his mother was a cook. By the time he was twelve his mother was a widow and he was working in Berlin with a large hand cart, delivering drinks to bars and kiosks. This enabled him to contribute three marks each week to the family housekeeping budget. His schooling formally ended after eight years, with his wish to get an apprenticeship unfulfilled. Between 1915 and 1917 he obtained a training of sort, working as a messenger for an insurance company, and also, during this time, working as a building labourer.

In 1917/18 he joined the army and was sent to the Eastern Front where he served as an infantry auxiliary and messenger. He returned to Berlin and worked in a range of jobs, most of them involving the railways. He joined the Transport Workers' Trades Union in 1920, and in 1923 he joined the recently formed German Communist Party, which he later said he had done "out of curiosity". He resigned from the party in 1924, but would later, in 1930, join it again, this time permanently. During the 1920s he held a succession of manual jobs, mostly involving transport or the building trade, but also including a period working as a packer in a soap factory. He participated in the occasional demonstration, but was not particularly active politically before 1930.

=== Politics and exile ===
Between 1931 and 1933 Munschke was unemployed. However, having rejoined the Communist Party in 1930 he participated actively in the party's "military-political" apparatus in the Berlin-Brandenburg region during these years. In January 1933 the NSDAP (Nazi party) took power and set about creating a one-party state in Germany. Munschke's Communist Party activities now became illegal and party members were subjected to harassment, assault and, in many cases, arrest followed by imprisonment. In October 1933 Munschke emigrated to the Soviet Union where he would remain till 1936. Between 1934 he was a student at a Comintern Academy in Moscow, also finding the energy to work on construction sites for the Moscow Metro and to undertake agricultural work.

In 1936 Munschke joined the International Brigades to fight for the Republican side in the Spanish Civil War. He started out as a "war commissar" in the multi-national Chapayev-Battalion of the XIII International Brigade. Later, jointly with Anton Ackermann and Franz Dahlem, he headed up a commissars' "party school" in Benicàssim. In 1938, the Party leadership, now in exile, summoned him to Paris in preparation for a posting on behalf of the Communist Party to Czechoslovakia. In the event that posting never came about because Czechoslovakia was surrendered to Germany. Instead Munschke was sent north to Belgium and the Netherlands where he would later become the head of the German Communist group in the country. In 1940 the German army invaded the Netherlands and Munschke became a resistance leader. He quickly mastered the Dutch language to the point where, armed with a forged Dutch passport, he was able to work for the Communist Party under a false identity as a Dutch businessman called Anton Bakker.

=== Outbreak of peace ===
The war ended in May 1945 and after nearly twelve years of exile, Ewald Munschke returned in September of the same year to Berlin, where there was no longer anything left of his parents' house. The eastern part of the city was under Soviet control: Munschke re-registered his Communist Party membership and was almost immediately given a job within the local party organisation before being appointed, in April 1946, to a position as Communist Party Secretary in the Berlin Police. He remained with the Berlin police department till 1949. In the meantime the German Communist Party was abolished later in April 1946 as a result of a controversial merger with the more moderately left-wing SPD (party). Within the Soviet occupation zone this established the basis for a return to one-party government. Communist Party members, along with those from the SPD, were invited to sign their membership across to the new SED party, and many did so. Ewald Munschke's own SED Party membership card is dated 1 May 1946. He took a position in the new party's Berlin regional leadership team, later during the decade becoming head of the important personnel department (Kaderabteiling).

=== National People's Army ===
In 1949 Munschke switched from local government to national government when he took a position working for the Party Central Committee, again becoming head of the critical Cadre Affairs Department. By 1952 the government and their allies were looking to create an East German Kasernierte Volkspolizei (People's Police in Barracks), a quasi-military police service which is seen, in retrospect, as a precursor to the establishment in 1956 of an East German army. One thing on which the Soviets and their western allies had agreed back in 1945 was that Germany should not have its own army, but after the establishment in 1949 of the German Democratic Republic and the de facto division of what remained of Germany into two separate states, each in one of two competing military alliances, and both German states accommodating several hundred thousand fraternal troops from (respectively) the United States and the Soviet Union, perceived priorities had changed. Both side were quietly preparing to re-introduce national armies into their versions of post-war Germany. In the late summer of 1952 Eward Munschke was surprised to find himself being interviewed by the East German leader, Walter Ulbricht himself. On 1 October 1952, despite never having held any military rank in any national army, Munschke was promoted to the (police) rank of major general, with the job of "Kaderchef", tasked by Ulbricht to select capable and suitable young men ("befähigte und geeignete junge Männer auszuwählen ...") for the new quasi-military police brigade. Munschke's record in the Spanish Civil War and as a resistance operative in the Netherlands during the war, together with his never-questioned loyalty to his country's Communist status quo, had evidently impressed Ulbricht, and he stayed in the post of "Kaderchef" to which he had been appointed by the leader for five years. The position went with a government job as Chief of Cadre administration ( Chef der Verwaltung Kader) in the Ministry for the Interior which was the government department responsible for the police. The National People's Army (NVA / Nationale Volksarmee) was formally founded on 1 March 1956, and this was also the date on which Ewald Munschke was appointed Deputy Minister for National Defence, and the country's first Head of Personnel Administration with the Ministry for National Defence (Chef der Verwaltung Kader beim Ministerium für Nationale Verteidigung). It was largely on the basis of Munschke's approach that the new East German officer class was drawn almost exclusively from the industrial and agricultural working classes.

=== Final years ===
In March 1961 Ewald Munschke was publicly and effusively congratulated by Walter Ulbricht on the occasion of his sixtieth birthday. That was not so unusual for someone at his level: since the army's creation in 1956 Munschke had sat as a member of the government defence committee, and been a member of the army's leadership circle, but on 31 January 1961 he had resigned from his military post. He now moved on to a position with The Party, serving as President of the Party Control Commission within the central political administration of the People's Army. The party was present and ultimately in control at various levels in every significant institution in the German Democratic Republic, so that Munschke's appointment at the top of the party control apparatus over the army was an important one. In addition, between 1962 and 1971 he was listed as a candidate for membership of the Party Central Committee itself. By 1971, however, he was no longer in a position to become a Central Committee member, having retired on 31 January 1969. He died ten years later.

== Awards and honours ==
- 1955 Patriotic Order of Merit in Silver
- 1956 Hans Beimler Medal
- 1961 Banner of Labor
- 1966 Patriotic Order of Merit in Gold
- 1971 Patriotic Order of Merit Gold clasp
- 1976 Order of Karl Marx
- 1981 Scharnhorst Order
- After he had died, on 1 March 1961, an army battalion was given the honorary title "Ewald Munschke" Battalion.
