= Commune de Paris Battalion =

- Flag of the battalion. One side is in French and the other side is in Spanish
- Active: October 1936–25 July 1938; 31 July 1938–23 September 1938
- Country: Majority: France and Belgium; Minority: United Kingdom, New Zealand, United States
- Allegiance: (Spain) Second Spanish Republic
- Branch: International Brigades
- Type: Foreign volunteer
- Role: Infantry
- Size: Battalion
- Part of: XI International Brigade
- Patron: Paris Commune
- Engagements: Spanish Civil War: Siege of Madrid; Battle of the Ebro

Commanders
- Notable commanders: Henri Rol-Tanguy

The Commune de Paris Battalion (French: Bataillon Commune de Paris) was a unit which fought on the Republican side during the Spanish Civil War.

== History ==
The battalion was formed in October 1936. It was composed mainly of French and Belgian communist volunteers, though it also included volunteers from the United Kingdom, the United States, and New Zealand. Sam Russell, a British volunteer on the Republican side, described the Commune de Paris Battalion as "just a collection of odds and sods." During the Siege of Madrid, many of the British and New Zealander members of the battalion were killed or wounded.

The battalion was practically annihilated on 25 July 1938 during the Battle of the Ebro, which caused what remained of the battalion to be sent into reserve. The battalion was reconstituted on 31 July 1938 and placed under the command of Henri Rol-Tanguy.
