= Hermann Diamanski =

German resistance fighter

Hermann Helmut Diamanski, also Dimanski (May 4, 1909, in Danzig (Gdańsk) – August 10, 1976, in Frankfurt (Main), West Germany) was a German resistance fighter against the National Socialist regime, communist, member of the International Brigades in the Spanish Civil War, and a political prisoner in the Auschwitz concentration camp.

== Early life ==
Diamanski, son of a marine engineer, graduated from community school, and went to sea from 1924 to 1935, working on German ships traveling between Germany, England, and the Soviet Union. At age 16, Diamanski became a member of the Young Communist League of Germany and in 1929 a full member of the Communist Party of Germany, KPD. In 1931, he went to the Reichsparteischule Rosa Luxemburg, a school run by the KPD in Lüneburg. In 1932, at age 23, he married his first wife, Helene Schmidt, who, according to Diamanski's personal account, was shot later in the Ravensbrück concentration camp, as he said to have heard from female prisoners of the concentration camp.

After Adolf Hitler and the National Socialists seized power (Machtergreifung), Diamanski emigrated to England to avoid the persecution of communists by the Nazis. From there he went to Spain in October 1937 to fight in the Spanish Civil War against the Nationalists around general Francisco Franco. Diamanski was a member of the XI International Brigade and later fought in the 3rd artillery battalion.

After the defeat of the Second Spanish Republic, Diamanski fled to Belgium, then France and returned to Spain, where he was arrested in Barcelona in 1940 by German agents and deported to Germany, where he was handed over to the Gestapo.

== Concentration camps ==
The first stop on his journey through many German prisons and concentration camps was the Welzheim concentration camp (KZ Welzheim), where he spent several weeks in the most miserable living and human conditions. Probably because they were hoping for some significant information, the Gestapo moved him soon to its prison in the Gestapo headquarters in Berlin, located at the Reich Main Security Office at Prinz-Albrecht-Straße 8. During his imprisonment in Berlin, Diamanski had to endure constant questioning and torture. He reports that one night, he was pulled out of his cell, put up against a wall and shot at - albeit with blanks as he realized after the first shock and thoughts of dying. In subsequent weeks he shared a cell with Wilhelm Boger, a Hauptsturmführer of the SS who was imprisoned for atrocities that according to Diamanski, were "even too much for the SS" at the time. While in the same cell, he shared some of his Red Cross Christmas packets with Boger, which later benefitted Diamanski, when Boger was the head of the Auschwitz concentration camp. In February 1941, Diamanski was transferred to the Sachsenhausen concentration camp where in the fall of that year, he was assigned to forced labor groups (Forced Labor in Germany during World War II) in a steel plant and later in a Gestapo school near Drögen.

In May 1942, Diamanski was transferred to the Auschwitz concentration camp, where he was interned at Auschwitz-Monowitz, also known as Auschwitz III. Because he was suspected of having contracted typhus, he was moved to Auschwitz-Birkenau, together with other prisoners. In the men's prison of Auschwitz-Birkenau he became a privileged prisoner because he saved the SS camp warden Erna Hermann and her child from drowning when he was in Drögen the year before. He also knew the supervisor of the Schutzhaftlager (protective custody camp), Johann Schwarzhuber from Sachsenhausen, and as a result, became block leader of Block 9 in the men's camp. Later, he became camp leader of the men's camp and eventually camp leader of the gypsy camp (Zigeunerlager Auschwitz) within Auschwitz-Birkenau, used to imprison and kill members of the Sinti and Roma people.

Rather than abusing his privileges in the camp, as many of the Kapos and camp leaders did, Diamanski used them to help fellow prisoners and participate in the organization of prisoner resistance. According to his own account, he participated in a conspiracy against the brutal Rapportführer Gerhard Palitzsch, that eventually led to Palitzsch being removed from his post. Diamanski, according to camp jargon called "Zigeunerbaron" (gypsy baron), supported his fellow prisoners, for example, by organizing food supplies, or even saving other communists from the gas chambers. "Because of his humanitarian attitude, he gave many thousands in the Auschwitz camp the courage to survive. Countless people are still alive today, because of his personal efforts and dedication." Because of his support and participation in the resistance, he was removed from his position as a camp leader during summer of 1944 and moved to the Strafkompanie, the penal work division of the concentration camp.

From there, he returned to Auschwitz-Birkenau and worked in the pump station. After the evacuation of the Auschwitz concentration camp, Diamanski walked in a death march via Gleiwitz to the Buchenwald concentration camp (almost 700 km, 420 miles). About 60,000 prisoners were marched out of Auschwitz at that time, of which at least 15,000 died on the journey. From Buchenwald, Diamanski was freed on April 11, 1945 by members of the US military.

== After the war ==
=== East Germany ===
After the end of the war, Diamanski worked as an interpreter for the US military as well as in a transportation company. In 1946, he was married a second time, for a few months, and in 1947, he married his third wife. In June 1947, after having been unemployed for almost a year, he and his wife moved to the Soviet occupation zone, where Diamanski joined the Schutzpolizei, the state-level police of Thuringia. After several promotions he joined the Volkspolizei, the federal police, in 1947, and later, in September 1948, the Grenzpolizei.

Because of accusations that later proved unsustainable, Diamanski was suspended for a few months, but in June 1949 he was reinstated into the police service and transferred to the Wasserschutzpolizei in Schwerin, in the north of the Soviet occupation zone. Because of the "western lifestyle" of his wife and being suspected of collaboration with the Counter Intelligence Corps he was removed from police service in December 1950. He became a teacher and temporarily deputy director of the Marine Navigation College in Wustrow. Because of an accusation that Diamanski was in West-Berlin without official permission, he was transferred to Magdeburg where was given the position of cultural director for the Deutsche Schiffahrts- und Umschlagszentrale the socialist organization owning and operating all previously private inland waterway vessels in East Germany.

=== Back in the West ===
In the spring of 1953, Diamanski and his family illegally moved to West Berlin, where he started working for the US Central Intelligence Group, the precursor to the CIA. Until 1970, Diamanski was under surveillance from the East German Ministerium für Staatssicherheit, also known as the Stasi. In December 1953, Diamanski and his family moved to the Bundesrepublik Deutschland, West Germany. Since then, he lived in Frankfurt and, after some temporary jobs, became a shipping clerk for a group of local newspapers.

Due to the torture and mistreatment suffered during his imprisonment, Diamanski suffered from memory loss, unrest and panic attacks. On March 19, 1964, Diamanski was a witness during the first Frankfurt Auschwitz Trial. He gave witness in particular about Wilhelm Boger and the liquidation of the gypsy camp in Auschwitz. Although he said about Boger that he left him unharmed in Auschwitz due to their joint imprisonment in Berlin, he still incriminated Boger heavily.

== See also ==
This article is in part based on the same article on the German Wikipedia site, extended by using additional independent references, especially Heiko Haumann's book Hermann Diamanski: Überleben in der Katastrophe: Eine deutsche Geschichte zwischen Auschwitz und Staatssicherheitsdienst (1910-1976). For the German article, see Hermann Diamanski.

== Additional literature ==
- Heiko Haumann: Hermann Diamanski: Ein deutsches Schicksal zwischen Auschwitz und Staatssicherheitsdienst. Perspektiven der Erinnerung, in: Birgit E. Klein; Christiane E. Müller, (Hg.): Memoria – Wege jüdischen Erinnerns. Festschrift für Michael Brocke zum 65. Geburtstag, Berlin 2005, S. 505-529. (pdf)
- Hermann Langbein: Menschen in Auschwitz. Frankfurt am Main, Berlin Danzig, Ullstein-Verlag, 1980, ISBN 3-548-33014-2
