= Edgar André (politician) =

German communist politician

Edgar Josef André
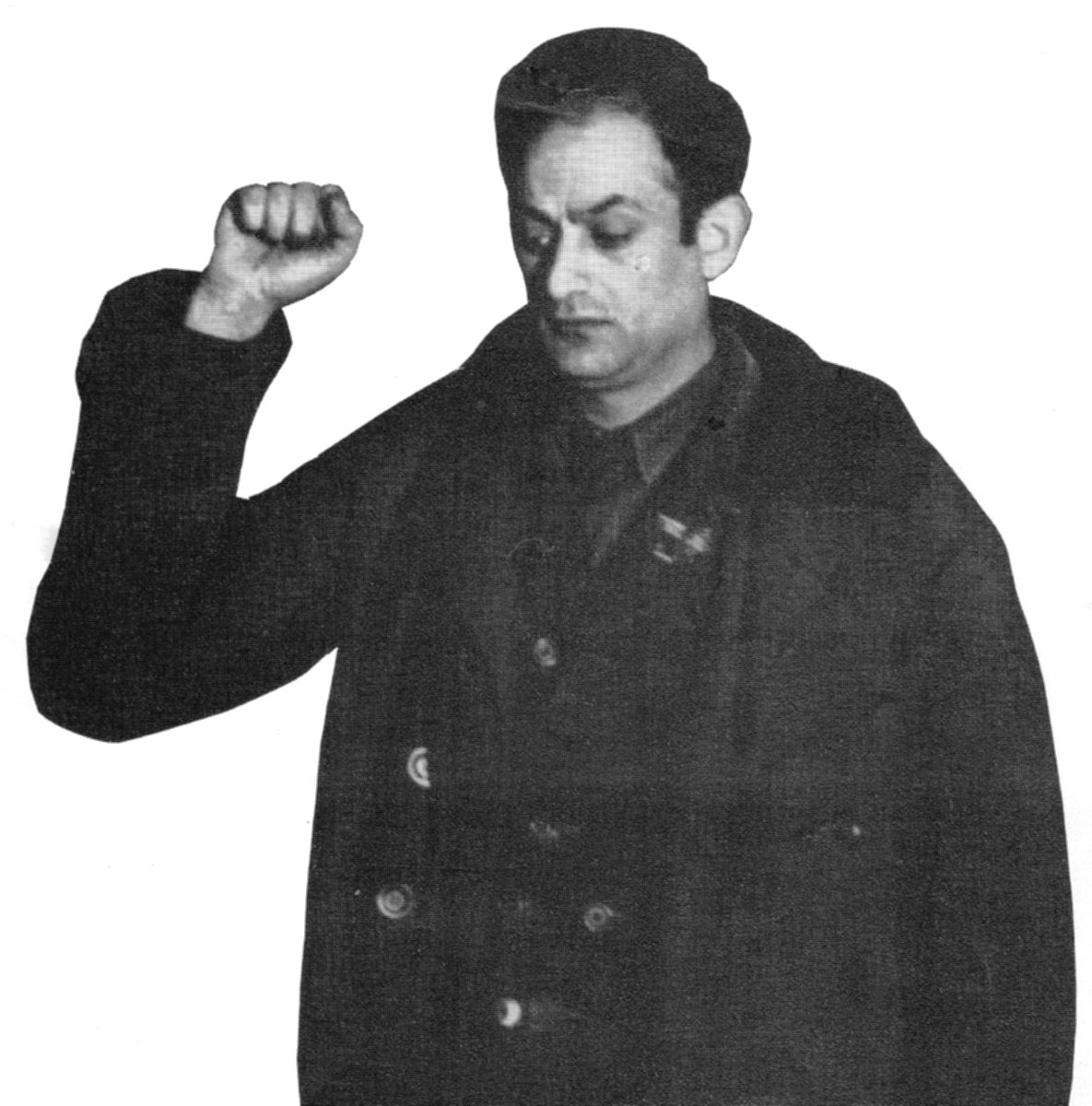
- André in 1931
- Born: 17 January 1894; Aachen, Germany
- Died: 4 November 1936 (aged 42); Hamburg, Nazi Germany
- Occupation: Politician
- Known for: Antifascism

Edgar Josef André, or Etkar Josef André (17 January 1894 – 4 November 1936) was a politician in the Communist Party of Germany (KPD) and an antifascist.

== Early years ==
Born in Aachen, André was a manual labourer's son. By the time he was five, he had already lost his father, and his mother, who was ill, found it quite hard to look after her three children. Belgian relatives brought them to Liège where for a while, Edgar found himself living at an orphanage. After leaving school, he took up an apprenticeship at a bookshop, where he came into contact with political literature.

== SPD membership ==
In 1911, he became a member of the Belgian Labour Party, and in only two years' time, he had become the Secretary of the Socialist Worker Youth in Brussels. In 1914, he took part in the Party Congress of the Belgian Labour Party. In the First World War, he volunteered for service in the Rhineland and in late 1918 wound up a prisoner of the French. After coming back to Germany, he went first to Koblenz, where he joined the Socialist Worker Youth and the Social Democratic Party of Germany (SPD). In 1922, he moved to Hamburg. There he worked in building and at the harbour, and he became a member of the Building Workers' Alliance, and later also the Transport Workers' Alliance.

== KPD membership ==
During the post-war early 1920s depression, which struck Germany especially hard owing to the war reparations exacted from it by the Treaty of Versailles, André came into sharp conflict with the SPD's policies, resulting in his resignation from the party, and his joining the KPD on 1 January 1923. He soon belonged to Ernst Thälmann's circle of friends. As a member of the KPD's Wasserkante District Leadership (1926–1930), he was one of the best liked labour leaders in Hamburg. As the Hamburg jobless workers' spokesman, he likewise stepped forward as co-founder and leader of the Wasserkante branch of the Rotfrontkämpferbund, the KPD's protection and defence organization (1924–1929). After attending the KPD's party school, André was, in 1931–32, active in the International Union of Seamen and Harbour Workers as an instructor and propagandist, spending much of his time in Belgium and France. His knowledge of French was a great advantage to him in this endeavour.

== Arrest, imprisonment, torture and death ==
After Hitler seized power following the Reichstag fire, Edgar André was arrested on 5 March 1933. He was held in custody for three and a half years, during which time he was tortured. When it was over, he could walk only on crutches, and he had lost his hearing. When his trial began in Hamburg on 4 May 1936, on charges of murder, nine cases of attempted murder and public order offences, the prosecution could only present insufficient evidence of André's guilt. Nevertheless, the prosecutor requested – one assumes on Hitler's personal orders – that the death penalty be imposed. On 10 July 1936, the judge imposed just such a sentence.

The authorities ignored the international protest movement over the case, and André was beheaded on 4 November 1936. A few hours later, Fuhlsbüttel Prison's 5,000 inmates went "on strike" in protest over André's death.

In the Spanish Civil War, shortly before his death, the first battalion of the International Brigades was formed under the name "Edgar André".
