= Emmy Dörfel =

German nurse

Emmy Dörfel (26 March 1908 – 18 May 2002) was a German nurse. She was awarded the Florence Nightingale Medal on 28 June 1963.
