= Thälmann Battalion =

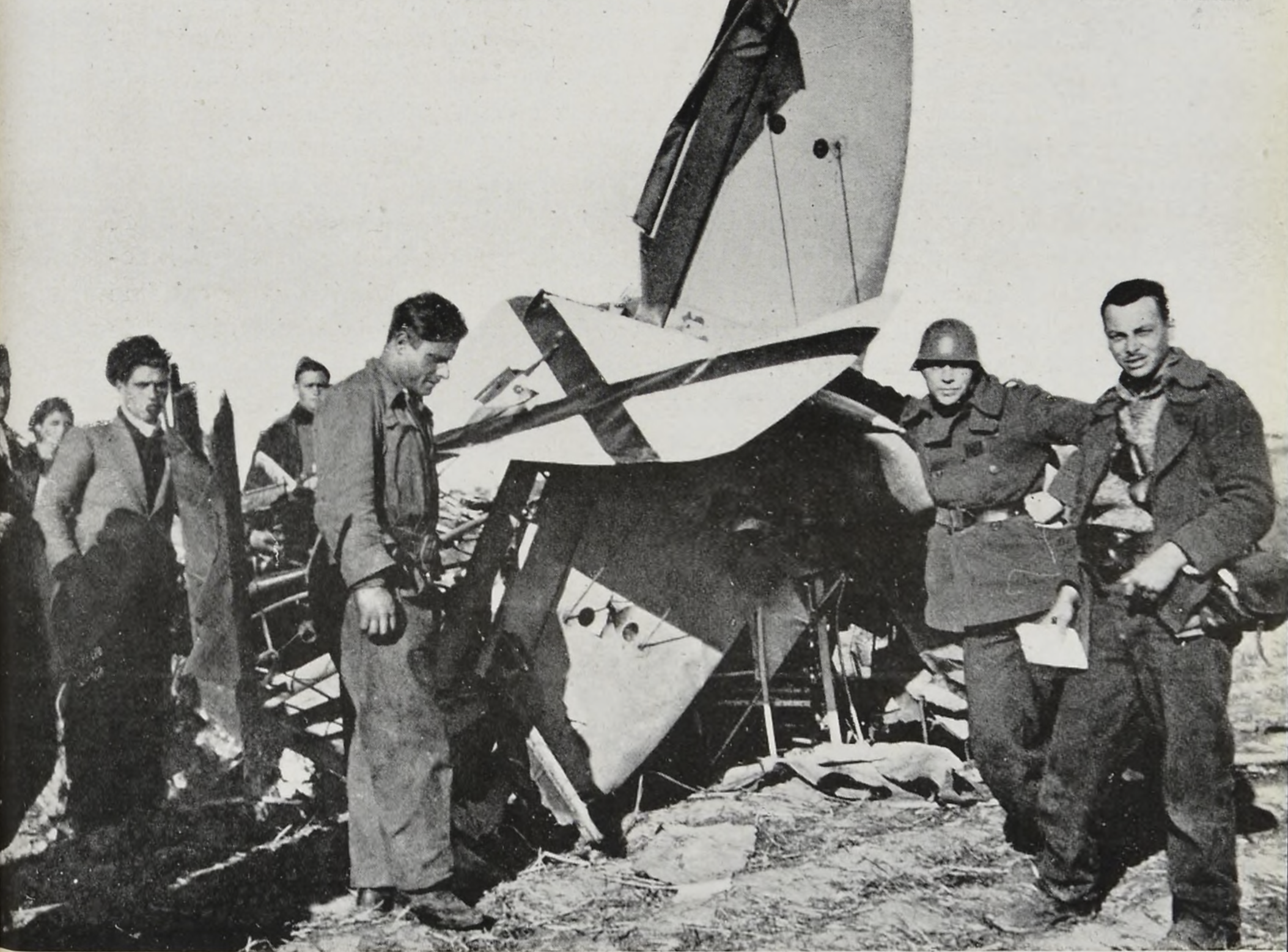
- Men of the Thälmann Battalion with a downed fascist airplane, February 1937
- Active: August 1936 – 6 November 1936; 9 November 1936 – October 1938; 8 August 1943 – November 1943
- Allegiance: Second Spanish Republic (1936-1938) (Yugoslav Partisans) Yugoslavia (1943)
- Branch: International Brigades (1936-1938); Yugoslav Partisans (1943)
- Size: 1,500 (1936); 200 (1943)
- Patron: Ernst Thälmann
- Engagements: Spanish Civil War: Siege of Madrid; Battle of Guadalajara; Battle of the Ebro; World War II: World War II in Yugoslavia

Commanders
- Notable commanders: Ludwig Renn; Hans Pichler

The Thälmann Battalion was a battalion of the International Brigades in the Spanish Civil War. It was named after the imprisoned German communist leader Ernst Thälmann (born 16 April 1886, executed 18 August 1944) and included approximately 1,500 people, mainly Germans, Austrians, Swiss and Scandinavians. The battalion fought in the defence of Madrid. Amongst the commanders of the battalion were the German writer, historian and World War I officer Ludwig Renn (later Chief of Staff of the XI International Brigade) and Prussian World War I officer Hans Kahle, later promoted to lead the Republican 45th division for a time. The battalion also included writer Willi Bredel, who became its commissar.

== Spanish Civil War German Volunteers ==
The German-speaking battalions (Note: There were several other German-language battalions (note that their organisation also changed several times)) were one of the first and eventually largest groups that formed in the International Brigades, coalescing out of the 'Thälmann Centuria' of the early war days. Most of the Germans volunteering were working-class people, "members of the Weimar Republic's 'lost generation', who had never known stability nor regular employment", and to many, the simple arrival in Spain (through the French blockade) to join the fight on the Republic's side was their first victory after years of losing their political struggle at home. In their home countries of Germany and Austria, fascism had already conquered, giving their foreign struggle a special grim context. As Robert Garland Colodny wrote in The International Brigades:

"The history of the Germans in Spain...is the history of strong men who proved and overproved their courage and endurance, their resistance to pessimism and despair. It is the story of men who died or were broken physically in doing this. They brought to the International Brigades an offensive spirit, a bitter desperate courage at rare intervals in war priceless, essential, but always costly. They set an early example of what shock troops could be like. They tried to do the impossible, and paid for it. And during the early days in Aragon, in the futile fighting around Huesca, at Tardienta, the Germans, in countless bayonet charges against fortified positions, took their objectives, buried their dead, and waited with a caged restlessness for the next day's orders."

John Cornford, an English communist and poet, echoed these thoughts, describing the Germans as:

"...the finest people in some ways I have ever met. In a way they have lost everything, have been through enough to break most people, and remain strong and cheerful and humorous. If anything is revolutionary it is these comrades."

Ernest Hemingway, the American writer, described them as follows:

"They had nearly all had military training or had fought in the war. They were all anti-Nazis. Most of them were Communists and they marched like the Reichswehr. They also sang songs that would break your heart and the last of them died on the Muela of Teruel, which was a position they sold as dearly as any position was sold in any war."

The battalion was destroyed on 6 November 1936 during the Siege of Madrid. On 9 November 1936, the battalion was reformed in Albacete.

Until December 1936 the battalion boasted a significant British contingent, including Winston Churchill's nephew, Esmond Romilly; however, many of them were killed fighting to defend Madrid in the early months of the war.

Flag of the International Brigades

Ernest Hemingway went even further in his admiration, calling them representative of the "true Germany" and contrasting them unfavourably with the Germans fighting on the other side in the Legion Condor. The respect with which the Germans were accorded – by the others in the International Brigades, as well as by the Republican populace – lifted their spirits as well. Many of them had been stripped of their nationality by the Nazis, and had spent years underground or in exile, and the war gave them the opportunity to reclaim an anti-fascist identity, their vision of a better Germany. For many it was also a time of either communist re-affirmation or political enlightenment (the largest block of all volunteers in the International Brigades was communist or had been recruited by communists).

However, the German volunteers were not above human faults and despair – especially as the war dragged on, and got increasingly difficult for the Republican side, which lacked the plentiful supplies and superior organisation of their Nationalist opponents. Records show that about one tenth of the volunteers eventually found themselves imprisoned at least for a certain duration for crimes like desertion, breaking discipline, or for political reasons as the Stalinist tendency in the Brigades increased (usually being accused of Trotskyism). Infighting between anarchists and communists, eventually resulting in outright battles with several hundred dead and the purging of rival communist groups like the Workers' Party of Marxist Unification (POUM), also further poisoned the atmosphere as Francisco Franco's victory came closer. The Thälmann Battalion was memorialized in the song "Die Thälmann-Kolonne" (also known as "Spaniens Himmel", "Spain's Sky") by Gudrun Kabisch and Paul Dessau (writing pseudonymously as Paul Ernst and Peter Daniel, respectively), famously recorded by Ernst Busch.

== World War II Partisan Battalion in the Former Yugoslavia ==
On 8 August 1943, a Thälmann Battalion was founded in West Slavonia as an ethnic German unit within Josip Broz Tito's Partisan army in the former Yugoslavia. It was composed mainly of German Army (Wehrmacht) deserters and local ethnic Germans (Shwoveh) led by Commander Hans Pichler (a former fighter in the Spanish civil war) and Johann Mucker (Muker), a Shwovish Communist in the interwar period, as political commissar. Mucker's son was killed by Ustashe on 13 March 1942, and later earned the honor of "People's Hero" after the war. The battalion comprised roughly 200 men and was refreshed from Shwovish recruits from Croatia and the Serbian Banat. It remained a separate unit with its own Germanic Black, red, and gold insignia. It is said that Tito ordered that it not be engaged in combat against German Army units (the Partisans also fought Italian, Hungarian, Bulgarian, Croatian, Slovenian and Serbian forces.) In the end it was nearly destroyed in an engagement against heavily armored units at Mikleus (near Slatina) in November 1943, but continued to exist with some replacements. It was used often for its propaganda value. It adopted its own version of the Spanish Civil War song "Die Thälmann-Kolonne".

== See also ==
- List of German veterans of the International Brigades
- Carolina Bunjes
- Foreign involvement in the Spanish Civil War
- Spanish Republican Army
