= XI International Brigade =

XI International Brigade Thälmann Brigade
- Active: 1936–1939
- Country: German and Austrian
- Allegiance: Spanish Republic
- Branch: International Brigades
- Type: Mixed Brigade
- Role: Home Defence
- Part of: 11th Division (1937); 35th Division (1937–1939)
- Garrison/HQ: Albacete, Barcelona
- Nickname: Brigada Thälmann
- March: Ballade der XI. Brigade
- Engagements: Spanish Civil War

Commanders
- Notable commanders: Manfred Stern; Hans Kahle; Richard Staimer; Heinrich Rau; Ferenc Münnich; Valter Roman

The XI International Brigade (Spanish: XI Brigada Internacional), also known as the Thälmann Brigade, was a foreign volunteer military unit organized by the Communist International to support the Second Spanish Republic during the Spanish Civil War. Formed in October 1936 in Albacete, it was the first unit of the International Brigades to be established. The brigade initially consisted of approximately 1,900 volunteers, primarily from Germany, Austria, France, and Poland, organized into the Edgar André, Commune de Paris, and Dąbrowski battalions.

On 8 November 1936, the brigade reinforced the Republican defense of Madrid during a Nationalist assault. Despite significant casualties, the brigade's involvement assisted in repelling the attack, which allowed further Republican reinforcements to reach the city.

== Order of battle ==
It was originally mustered from international volunteers at Albacete, Spain, in mid-October 1936 as the IX Brigada Movíl, with four battalions:

- Franco-Belgian Battalion (14 Oct 1936)
- Austro-German Battalion (14 Oct 1936)
- Italo-Spanish Battalion (14 Oct 1936)
- Polish-Balkan Battalion (17 Oct 1936)

It was redesignated the 'XI "Hans Beimler" International Brigade' on 22 October 1936, with General "Kléber" (Manfred Stern) commanding. The original battalions were renamed as follows:

- The Franco-Belgian battalion, led by Jules Dumont, became the Commune de Paris Battalion
- The Austro-German battalion, led by Hans Kahle, became the Edgar André Battalion, (after Edgar André).
- The Italo-Spanish battalion became the Garibaldi Battalion, (after Giuseppe Garibaldi).
- The Polish-Balkan battalion, led by Boleslav Ulanovski, became the Dabrowski Battalion (pronounced "Dombrowski"), (after Jarosław Dąbrowski).

Shortly after the formation of XII International Brigade in November, 1936, its Thälmann Battalion and the Garibaldi Battalion (which had no rifles) swapped places.

Other units that formed part of XI International Brigade at other times were:

- Anna Pauker Battery – Franco-Belgian Group
- Asturias-Heredia Battalion
- Hans Beimler Battalion
- Madrid Battalion
- Pacifico Battalion
- Pasionaria Battalion
- Zwölfter Februar Battalion

The brigade fought in the battles of Madrid, the Corunna Road, Jarama, Guadalajara, Brunete, Belchite, Teruel, and the Ebro. After the death of Hans Beimler the energetic Giuseppe Di Vittorio became the political commissar.

== Commemoration ==
On 18 July 1956, the German Democratic Republic issued the Hans Beimler Medal to veterans of the XI International Brigade, and other volunteer units in Spain. At the time, there were 632 surviving veterans alive. On the 20th anniversary of the end of the war, in September 1959, a further 112 were awarded. The medal is silver with a relief portrait of Hans Beimler on one side, and the three-pointed star of the International Brigades on the reverse, with the inscription "KAMPFER FVR SPANIENS FREIHEIT 1936-1939", Fighters for Spanish Liberty (1936–1939).

== See also ==
- Carolina Bunjes
- International Brigades
- International Brigades order of battle
