= Hans Kahle =

German journalist and head of police (1899–1947)

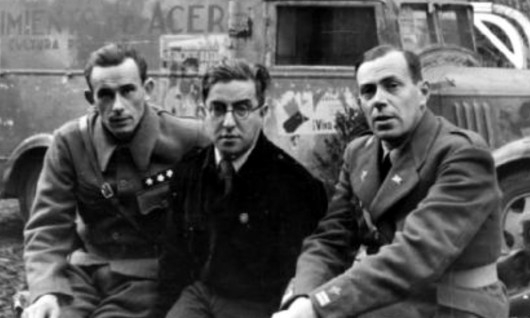
- Kahle (right) with Richard Staimer (left) and Mikhail Koltsov (center) in Spain c. 1936–1937
- Born: 22 April 1899; Berlin, Province of Brandenburg, Kingdom of Prussia, German Empire
- Died: 1 September 1947 (aged 48) Ludwigslust, Allied-occupied Germany
- Allegiance: German Empire; Spanish Republic
- Branch: Imperial German Army; International Brigades; Spanish Republican Army
- Rank: Lieutenant Colonel
- Conflicts: World War I; Spanish Civil War; Siege of Madrid; Battle of Ciudad Universitaria; Second Battle of the Corunna Road; Battle of Jarama; Battle of Guadalajara; Battle of Ebro; World War II
- Other work: Politician; Journalist; Propagandist

Hans Kahle (22 April 1899 – 1 September 1947) was a German communist journalist and military officer who commanded several units of the International Brigades and Spanish Republican Army during the Spanish Civil War. He later served as head of the Volkspolizei in Mecklenburg.

== Education and career ==
Kahle was born in Berlin-Charlottenburg, the son of a senior official. He attended high school, followed by the main military academy, the Preußische Hauptkadettenanstalt, in Lichterfelde. He fought as a cadet and later as an Oberleutnant in the 82nd Infantry Regiment of the Imperial German Army during World War I and became a prisoner of war in 1918, held by the Third French Republic, from which he was repatriated in 1920.

After the war, he began a commercial apprenticeship and attended the London School of Economics. From 1921 to 1926, he was a clerk in Mexico, and returned to the Weimar Republic in 1927. He became a member of the German Communist Party (KPD) in 1928. During 1930–1933, he served as editor, publishing director and later chairman of the independent radio-federal employees and the intelligence service of the Communist Party.

In 1933, he was forced to emigrate to Switzerland, and later he was sent to France. There he worked as a journalist, as an editor of Tribunal, and organized for the International Red Aid in Spain relief efforts for the Victims of the Asturian miners' uprising. In 1936 he worked in Paris in the organizing committee of the International Brigades in Spain, until he went to Spain in October. According to information later received by British Intelligence, Kahle was alleged to have been one of the leading spymasters for the NKVD, the Soviet political police, in the Second Spanish Republic.

Kahle fought until 1938 in the Spanish Civil War, in the International Brigade of the Spanish Republican Army. From October 1936, he was commander of the Edgar André Battalion, which was subsequently integrated into the XI International Brigade (Thälmann). In 1937, he became commander of the 17th Division, and during the Battle of the Ebro in 1938 he commanded the 45th Division of the Spanish Republican Army.

During 1938 and 1939, he was interned as an enemy alien by the Third French Republic. Between 1940 and 1941, Kahle was also interned by the United Kingdom on the Isle of Man and in Canada. After his release in 1941, Kahle returned to London, where he worked as a war correspondent. He was a founding member of the Free Germany Movement, which was believed by MI5, the British domestic counterintelligence service, to be a front for recruiting anti-Nazi refugees into a Soviet NKGB spy ring. MI5 also believed Kahle to be a very high level Soviet intelligence operative and spymaster and, in addition to opening his mail, MI5 secretly had Kahle under constant surveillance. For this very reason, in fact, intercepting a wartime letter to Kahle from Eric Hobsbawm led MI5 to start a file on the latter.

In February 1946, Kahle returned to the Soviet Zone of Occupied Germany, which he helped to build into a future Soviet Bloc state that would later be named the German Democratic Republic. Kahle became chief of the Volkspolizei in Mecklenburg and state chairman of the ruling Socialist Unity Party of Germany (SED) in Mecklenburg. On August 22, 1947 he had to undergo a serious stomach operation, which he did not survive. He died in Ludwigslust in 1947 at the age of 48.

== In popular culture ==
- Hans Kahle was the model for the character of General Hans in the war novel For Whom the Bell Tolls by Ernest Hemingway.
