= Hans Beimler (politician) =

German politician (1895–1936)

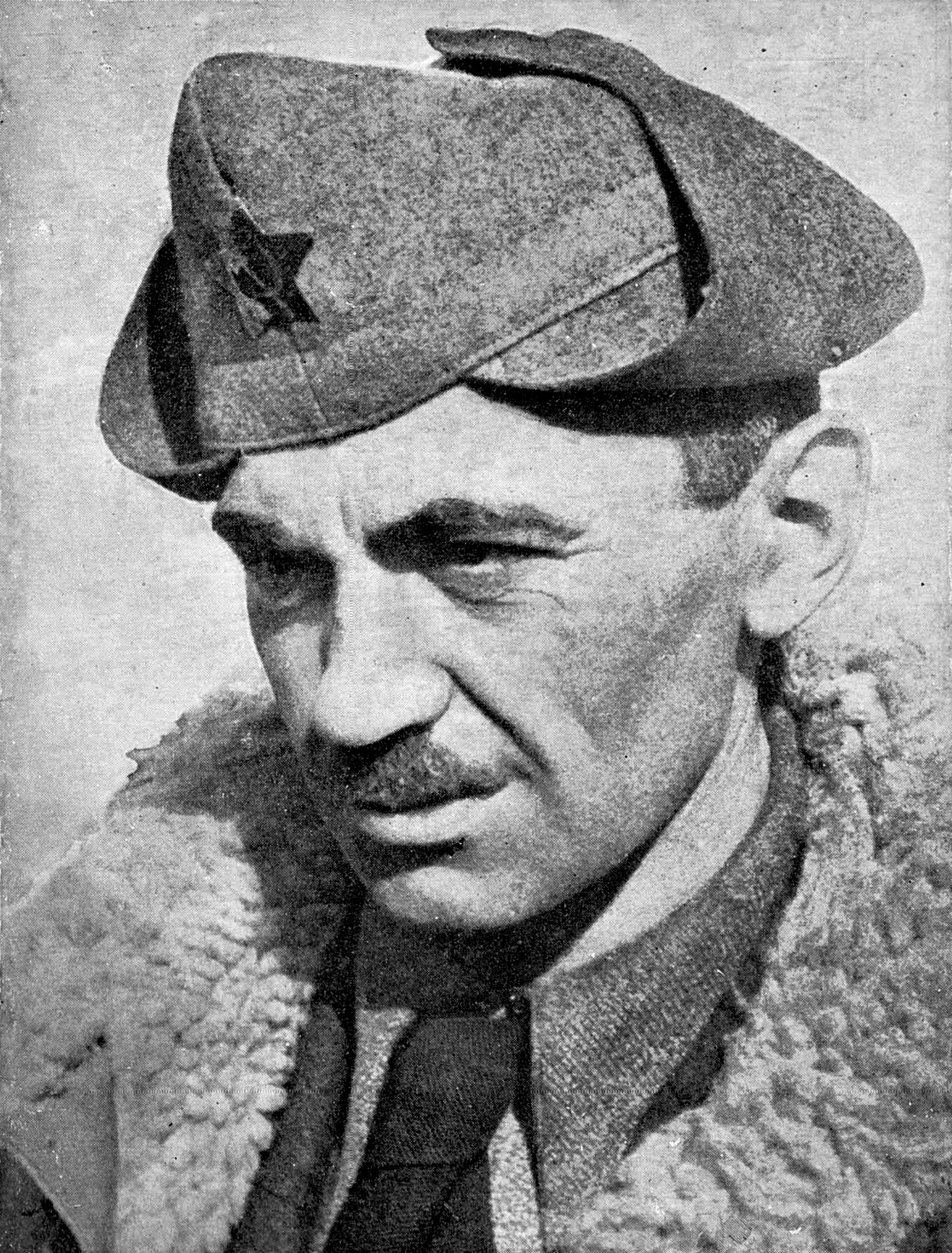
- Beimler in 1936

Member of the Reichstag for Upper Bavaria–Swabia
- In office 31 July 1932 – 28 February 1933
- Preceded by: Multi-member district
- Succeeded by: Constituency abolished

Member of the Landtag of Bavaria for Munich
- In office 24 April 1932 – 31 March 1933
- Preceded by: Multi-member district
- Succeeded by: Constituency abolished

Personal details
- Born: Johannes Baptist Beimler; 2 July 1895 Munich, German Empire
- Died: 1 December 1936 (aged 41) Madrid, Spain
- Cause of death: Killed in action (gunshot wound to the back)
- Party: Communist Party of Germany
- Spouse(s): Magdalene Müller (m. 1919; died 1928) Centa Dengler (m. 1930)
- Children: Rosemarie; Johann
- Parent: Rosina Beimler (mother)
- Relatives: Hans Beimler (grandson)

Military service
- Allegiance: German Empire; Munich Soviet; Spanish Republic
- Branch/service: Imperial German Navy; Bavarian Red Army; International Brigades
- Years of service: 1914–1918; 1918–1919; 1936
- Rank: Commissar
- Unit: XI International Brigade
- Battles/wars: World War I; German Revolution; Spanish Civil War; Battle of Madrid †
- Other offices held: 1932–1933: Political Leader, South Bavaria KPD

Johannes Baptist "Hans" Beimler (2 July 1895 – 1 December 1936) was a German communist politician and trade unionist who served in the Reichstag and the Landtag of Bavaria from 1932 to 1933. An outspoken opponent of the Nazis, he was imprisoned at Dachau concentration camp after they came to power, but managed to escape, later volunteering in the International Brigades fighting for the Republicans in the Spanish Civil War, where he would die in action.

== Early life ==
Johannes Baptist Beimler was born on 2 July 1895 in Munich to Rosina Beimler, an unmarried cook and a farm worker. As a three-week-old infant, he was sent to the village of Waldthurn in the Oberpfalz region of Northeastern Bavaria to be raised by his maternal grandparents. His grandfather had a locksmith's business and Beimler followed the family tradition into this trade. In 1913 he joined the German Metal Workers Union (DMV). In 1914, he was conscripted and joined the Kaiserliche Marine serving on minesweepers and rising eventually to the rank of "Mate". In 1917 he was awarded the Iron Cross. In 1918 took part in the November Revolution at Cuxhaven. Returning to Munich, Beimler joined the Spartacus League and in the chaotic period following the armistice, during which there were several revolutionary governments in Germany, he supported the Munich Soviet ("Räterepublik"). In July 1919 Beimler married Magdalene Müller in Hamburg with whom he had a daughter, Rosemarie (1919), and (after moving back to Bavaria) a son, Johann (1921). Following a series of Beimler's extramarital infidelities, Magdalene committed suicide in 1928. In 1930 Beimler married Centa Dengler, who worked at the KPD's Neue Zeitung in Munich.

== Political career ==
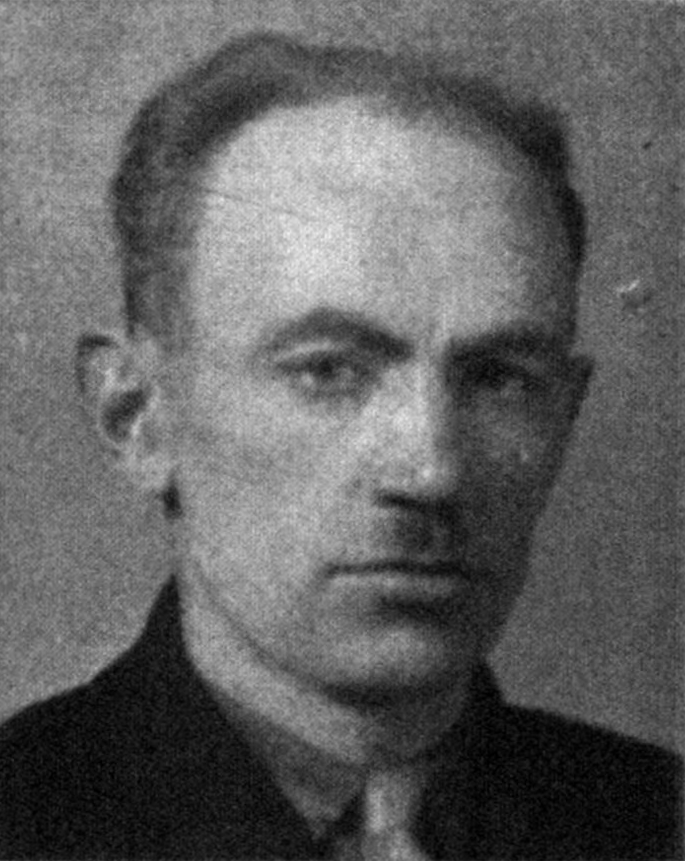
Beimler's official Reichstag portrait, 1932

After the overthrow of the Munich Soviet ("Räterepublik") by the right-wing Freikorps, Beimler settled in Munich where he joined the Communist Party and became chairman of the local branch in the Munich suburb of Nymphenburg. In 1921 he was arrested for attempting to sabotage troop transports and was jailed for 2 years, just months after the birth of their second child. After his release, he worked in the locomotive factory of Krauß & Co, where he became a trade union leader. In 1925 he was nominated by the congress of Munich trade unions to represent them in the first delegation of German workers to visit the Soviet Union.

In 1928 the KPD requested him to re-organize the party in Augsburg in Southern Bavaria, where he was elected to the City Council (Stadtrat). A fervent Communist and anti-Nazi, he was elected as a KPD deputy to the Reichstag in the German federal election in July 1932. In the same year he was elected to the Bavarian Landtag and succeeded Albert Buchmann as political leader of the KPD in Southern Bavaria.

In February 1933, during the election campaign for the Reichstag, Beimler addressed the crowd at the last public meeting the KPD were able to hold at Circus Krone in Munich. With the battle cry "We shall all meet again at Dachau!" he rallied the crowd to resist the growing Nazi threat, referencing one of the few victories the Red Army of the Munich Soviet ("Räterepublik") had over the right-wing Freikorps at Dachau in 1919.

== Internment in Dachau ==
Hitler came to power in January 1933 and with the Reichstag Fire Decree for the Protection of People and State, one month later, began interning political rivals, including KPD and SPD members, in concentration camps. Beimler and his wife Centa were both arrested in April 1933 and never saw each other again. Already known as an outspoken and defiant anti-Nazi voice in the Reichstag, Beimler and his party colleagues were subjected to two weeks of beatings at the Munich police Praesidium on Ettstraße before being sent to Dachau concentration camp, where the SS guards taunted him with his Dachau remark made ten weeks prior. Hilmar Wäckerle, Dachau's first camp commandant, boasted that he would kill Beimler himself. Indeed, several Communist prisoners of Jewish heritage had already been murdered under his regime. However, with the suspicious deaths of Dachau prisoners already under investigation, Wäckerle decided that, with sufficient physical and mental abuse, Beimler could be encouraged to commit suicide. After four weeks, however, in May 1933 Beimler managed to escape, possibly with the help of some renegade camp guards. He managed to cross into Czechoslovakia and on to the Soviet Union.

His wife, Centa, was trapped in Nazi Germany and was imprisoned in Moringen women's concentration camp and other prisons until 1945. His children Rosi and Hansi were taken in by relatives in the Oberpfalz until Beimler organized their escape to the Soviet Union in 1934.

Beimler wrote an account of his experiences at Dachau which appeared in the Soviet Union in August 1933: Im Mörderlager Dachau: Vier Wochen unter den braunen Banditen. It was one of the first published accounts of life inside a Nazi concentration camp and was translated into several languages, including English, Spanish, French and Yiddish. In 1934, Germany revoked Beimler's citizenship.

== Spanish Civil War ==
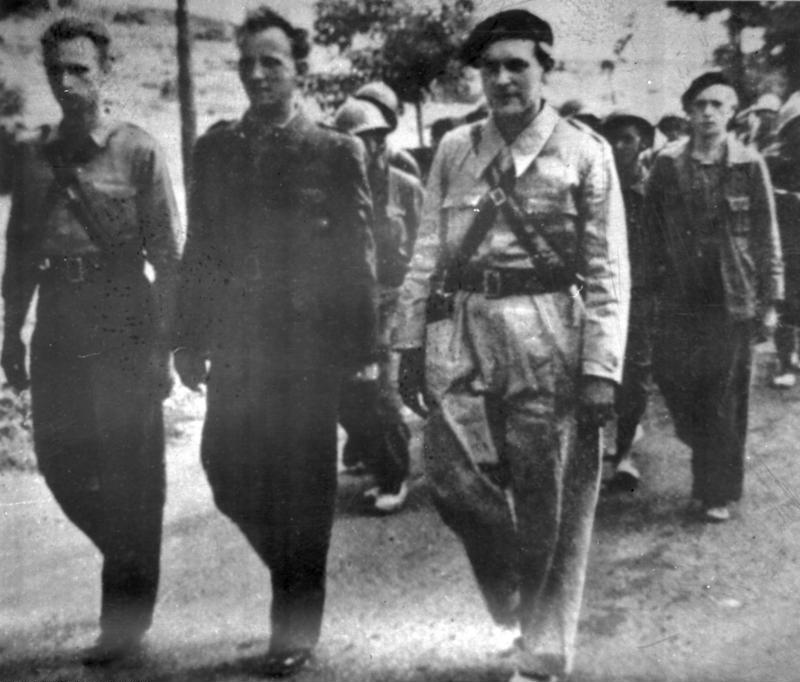
Members of the Hans Beimler Battalion at the Guadalajara front in 1937

After short periods in France and Switzerland, working for the International Red Aid (Rote Hilfe) organisation, Beimler arrived in Barcelona in August 1936 at the head of the first brigade of German anti-fascist volunteers, fighting alongside the Republican troops under the name "Thälmann's Centurians". He was subsequently appointed as commissar of all International Brigades supporting the Spanish Republic during the Spanish Civil War. In November 1936, while helping to defend Madrid from the Nationalists, he was shot and killed. Unverified rumours, which some sources claim were initiated by Nazi authorities, subsequently spread that he was shot from behind by an agent of the NKVD, the secret service of the USSR, or by brigade commander Richard Staimer.

Over 2 million people paid their respects as his body was transported from Madrid to Montjuïc Cemetery, Barcelona, where he was buried. He was celebrated in a song of Ernst Busch (after a melody by Friedrich Silcher), which was then recorded by the radio station in Barcelona. The XI International Brigade was named in his honour. In Ernest Hemingway's novel, For Whom the Bell Tolls, the American protagonist Robert Jordan meets with a German revolutionary, Hans, who is based on Beimler. A week after the fall of Barcelona in January 1939, the Nationalists desecrated the graves of Beimler and his adjutant Luis Schuster (aka Franz Vehlow), burned their corpses and leveled the graves.

His son, Hans Beimler Jr. was arrested in Moscow in the NKVD Hitler Youth Conspiracy. He was later released, along with the son of Max Maddalena, another prominent Communist, and two others. His grandson Hans Beimler is a well-known American screenwriter.

== Legacy ==
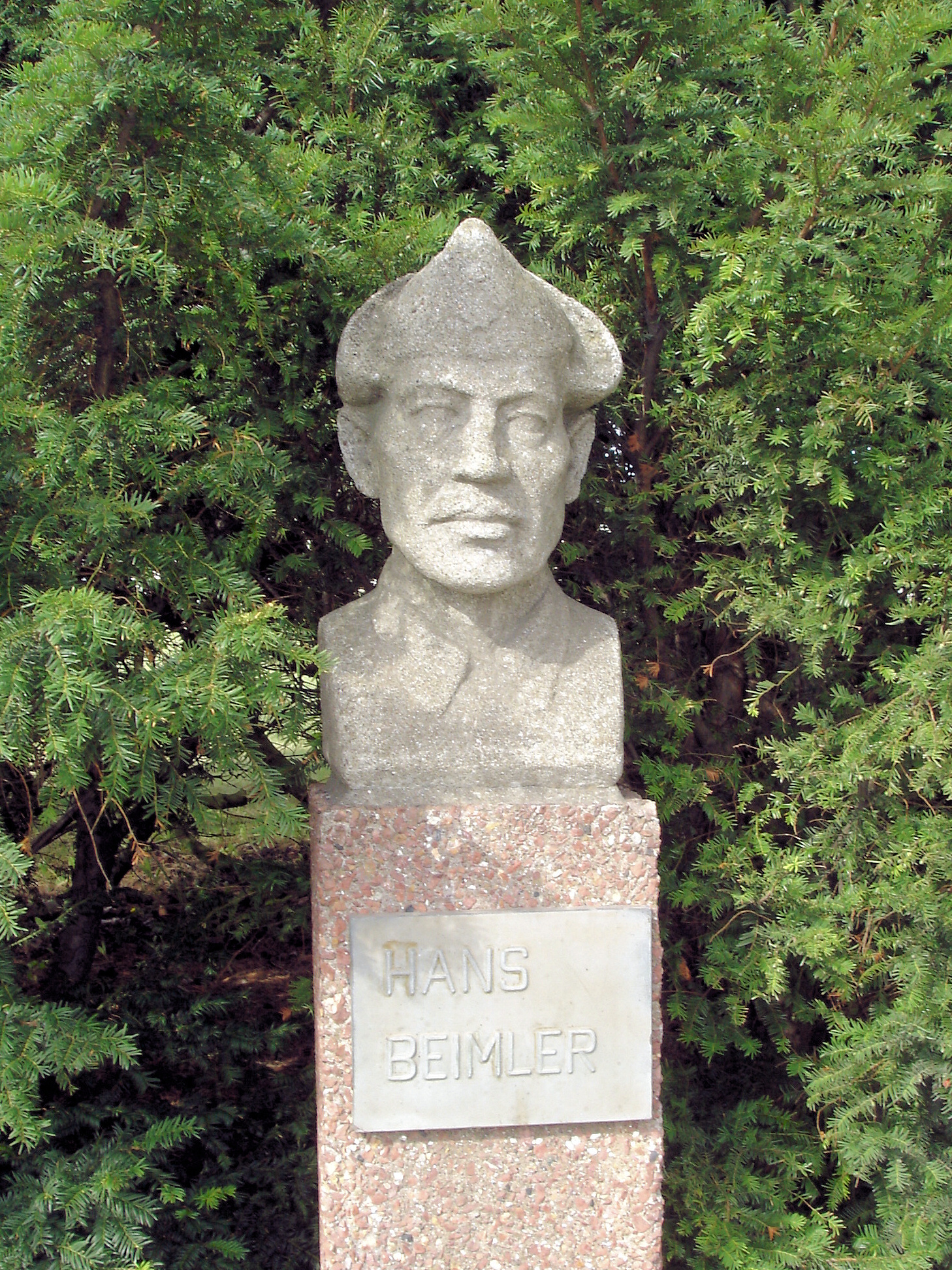
Commemorative bust of Hans Beimler in Rostock

Hans Beimler was granted national hero status in the German Democratic Republic, with military divisions, ships, factories, schools and streets named in his honour. The Tarantul-class corvette Hans Beimler (575) was commissioned with the Volksmarine from 1986 to 1990, and following German reunification was preserved at Peenemunde as a museum ship.

The Freie Deutsche Jugend (FDJ), the Communist Party's youth movement, dedicated their paramilitary exercise tournament to him.

His legend grew and he was even spoken of as a left-wing intellectual. In 1956 the GDR instituted the Hans Beimler Medal, awarded to citizens who had fought for the Spanish Republic in the civil war.

== Film and TV ==
- Han Beimler: Comrade 4-part Mini-Series (1969) Dir:Rudi Kurz
- Spanien im Herzen – Hans Beimler und andere (1986) – 45 minutes – Dir:Karlheinz Mund
- Die Sprungdeckeluhr (1990) – DEFA – Dir:Gunter Friedrich
- Clash of Futures (Krieg der Träume) Episode 1: Hans Beimler (2014) – ARTE – Dir:Jan Peter, Frédéric Goupil

== Sources ==
- Beevor, Antony (2006). The Battle for Spain. Penguin. ISBN 9780143037651.
- Simkin, John (2015). "Spartacus Educational: Hans Beimler". Spartacus Educational.
- "Memorial Sheet 9: Hans and Centa Beimler" (PDF). German Union of Anti-fascists (Augsburg branch). 2015.
- Beimler, Hans (2012). Im Mörderlager Dachau: Vier Wochen in den Händen der braunen Banditen (1933) (in German). Köln: PapyRossa Verlag. ISBN 978-3-8943-8480-7.
- Wachsmann, Nikolaus (2015). KL: A History of the Nazi Concentration Camps. London, UK: Little, Brown. ISBN 978-1-4087-0556-8.
- "Hans Beimler Timeline" (PDF). PappyRossa Verlag Köln. 9 December 2011.
