= Hans Beimler Medal =

- Type: Medal
- Awarded for: Fighting in the Spanish Civil War on the side of the Republicans
- Presented by: East Germany
- Status: Not currently awarded
- Established: 17 May 1956
- The ribbon of the Hans Beimler Medal

The Hans Beimler Medal (German: Hans Beimler Medaille) was a GDR decoration. The medal was instituted on 17 May 1956 and was awarded to East Germans who fought in the Spanish Civil War on the side of the Republicans. The medal was named after Hans Beimler, the first commissar of the German Communist contingent and the XI International Brigade in Spain. The medal was presented in the name of the Chairman of the Council of Ministers.

== Placement ==
The medal was displayed on the upper left chest when worn and was positioned between the Medal for Fighters against Fascism and the Clara Zetkin Medal in the order of precedence.

== Design ==
=== Medal ===
Obverse

The medal is round, on the front there is a depicting of Hans Beimler surrounded with its name and the dates of his birth and death (1895–1936).

Reverse

On the center of the reverse there is a three-pointed star, the emblem of the International Brigades surrounded with the words "INTERNATIONALE BRIGADEN" (INTERNATIONAL BRIGADES) and "KAMPFER SPANIENS FREIHEIT 1936–1939" (FIGHTERS FOR SPANISH LIBERTY 1936–1939).

=== Ribbon and Bar ===
The ribbon

The medal is suspended from rectangular ribbon bar (the ribbon is in full length in the version for army members) of red, yellow, and violet horizontal strips in equal proportion, these were the colors of the Spanish Republican Flag. On the outer edges of both sides are narrow vertical strips of black, red, and gold, the colors of the German Flag.

== See also ==
- Awards and decorations of East Germany
- List of German veterans of the International Brigades
- Spanish Cross
