= 129th International Brigade =

Military unit that served in the International Brigades during the Spanish Civil War

129th International Brigade Forty Nations Brigade 129.ª Brigada Internacional
- Active: 8 February 1938 - 28 March 1939
- Country: Various, but mostly Central and Eastern Europe and the Balkans
- Allegiance: Spain
- Branch: International Brigades
- Type: Mixed Brigade - Infantry
- Role: Home Defence
- Part of: 29th Division (1937 —forerunner unit); 45th Division (1938); 39th Division (1938-39)
- Nickname: Forty Nations Brigade
- Engagements: Spanish Civil War: Aragon Offensive; Levante Offensive
- Decorations: Medal of Bravery

Commanders
- Notable commanders: Wacław Komar, José Pellicer Gandía, Miguel Martínez Nieto

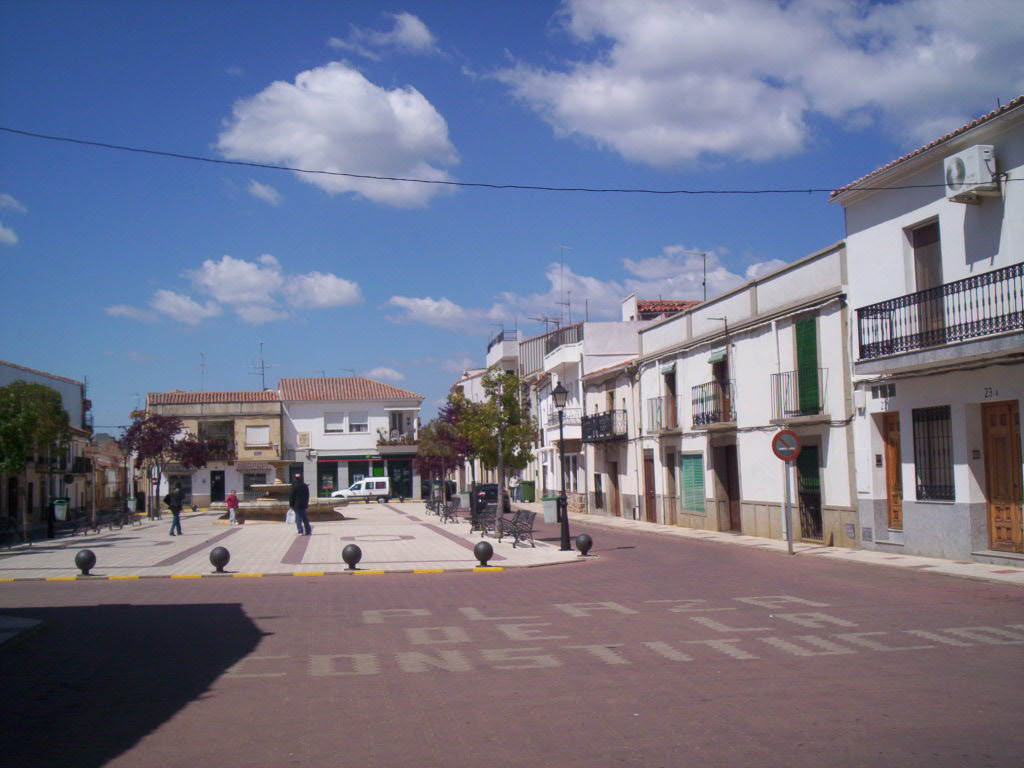
Central square of Chillón, the town where the CXXIX International Brigade was established in February 1938.

The 129th International Brigade was a military unit of the International Brigades during the Spanish Civil War. Its members were from a number of different countries thus it was also known as "Forty Nations Brigade" (Spanish: Brigada de las cuarenta naciones).

== History ==
=== 129th Mixed Brigade ===
A predecessor 129th Mixed Brigade had been established in 1937 made up mainly of POUM militiamen. It was made part of the new 29th Division of the Spanish Republican Army and saw its baptism of fire in Northern Aragon. Owing to its alleged faulty performance in the combats of the Battle of Sabiñánigo and the Huesca Offensive, both the brigade and the division were wrapped up. The disbandment, however, fell in line with the persecution of the POUM by the Communists following the May Events of 1937 in Barcelona.

=== International Brigade ===
The defunct mixed brigade was revived as the CXXIX International Brigade in Chillón (Ciudad Real Province) on 8 February 1938. It brought together the odds and ends of assorted reorganized international units. Although nicknamed "Forty Nations Brigade", most of its men were from Poland, Czechoslovakia and Yugoslavia. Its first leader was Polish officer Wacław Komar, who had previously led the Dombrowski Battalion in the XIII International Brigade. On 13 February it was made part of the 45th Division. After having been sent west to Castuera on 16 February the CXXIX International Brigade saw its first brief combat action at the Extremaduran Front.

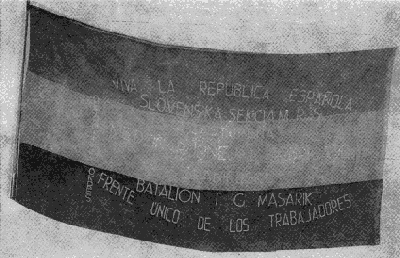
Flag of the Brigade's 3rd Battalion, "Masaryk".

The beginning of the rebel Aragon Offensive necessitated the swift transferring of the CXXIX International Brigade to the eastern part of the Iberian System. The brigade arrived on 25 March to the mountain town of Morella. In the new location it faced relentless attacks from the enemy until it had to withdraw on 4 April after having suffered numerous casualties. Owing to the severe depletion of its ranks, the brigade was sent then to nearby Sant Mateu for reorganization. As it happened to be further south of the eastward-pushing rebel thrust, the CXXIX International Brigade had become detached from the remaining international brigades of the 45th Division and it was discharged from it on 30 June. The other units of the division became isolated in Catalonia when the territory held by the Spanish Republic was split in two by the swift crumbling of the loyalist defense in Aragon. In its new location the brigade was strengthened with new weapons and Spanish recruits, being made part thenceforward of the 39th Division. In the course of the following months the brigade took refuge in La Iglesuela del Cid and took part in numerous actions of the Levante Campaign. In September the unit attained distinction in battle in combats and skirmishes around the Alto del Buitre and the Sierra de Javalambre, being collectively awarded the Medal of Bravery.

=== Twilight and end of the unit ===
On the 16 October the brigade lost its international members and became a regular republican mixed brigade under the leadership of infantry commander José Pellicer Gandía (replaced later by Vicente Gimeno Gomis, and temporarily by Miguel Martínez Nieto). It would stay covering the same area of the front until the end of the war.

Meanwhile, the international fighters were gathered at Moncada, Valencia and were sent by ship to Barcelona. There they intended to take part in the Catalonia Campaign under the former leader of the Dimitrov Battalion, Czechoslovak commander Josef Pavel. In the middle of the Republican debacle in Catalonia the former CXXIX International Brigade members joined other foreign volunteers who had chosen to remain in Spain and tried to defend Vic. But in the face of the overwhelming rebel pressure they were not successful and had to join the general withdrawal towards the north. Finally they reached the French border at the beginning of February and left Spain.

== Structure ==
=== Leaders ===
- Commanders-in-chief:

Name	Country	Period	Notes
Wacław Komar	Poland	11 February 1938 - 16 October 1938	After the dissolution of the International Brigades, he leaves Spain and the Brigade becomes the 129th Mixed Brigade, integrated now solely by Spaniards.
José Pellicer Gandía	Spain	16 October - End of 1938	Apprehended by the enemy in Alicante.
Miguel Martínez Nieto	Spain	End of 1938 - Beginning of 1939	Former Chief of Staff of the Brigade and Commander of the 3rd Battalion "Masaryk", assumes the command of the Brigade due to leave of its commander-in-chief.
Vicente Gimeno Gomis	Spain	End of 1938 - 29 March 1939	

- Commissar: Lorenzo González del Campo, of the CNT.

=== Order of battle ===
During its existence as an International Brigade the unit included the following battalions:

- First Dimitrov Battalion (Spanish: 1.^{er} Batallón Dimitrov), made up of various nations of the Balkans.
- Second Đuro Đaković Battalion (Spanish: 2.º Batallón Đuro Đaković), composed mainly of Yugoslav and Bulgarian fighters.
- Third Masaryk Battalion (Spanish: 3.^{er} Batallón Masaryk), which included different nationalities, but where Czechs and Slovaks predominated. It was initially under the command of Egon Erwin Kisch, a famous Czech journalist.
- 35th Anglo-American Battery Under the command of Nathan Budish

== See also ==
- International Brigades
- International Brigades order of battle
- Polish volunteers in the Spanish Civil War
- Josep Almudéver Mateu

== Bibliography ==
- Beevor, Antony. The Battle for Spain. The Spanish Civil War 1936–1939. Penguin Books. London. 2006. ISBN 0-14-303765-X
- Engel, Carlos. Historia de las Brigadas Mixtas del E. P. de la República, Almena. Madrid. 1999. ISBN 84-922644-7-0
- Castells Peig, Andreu (1974). Las brigadas internacionales de la guerra de España. Editorial Ariel. ISBN 978-84-344-2460-9
- Thomas, Hugh. The Spanish Civil War. Penguin Books. London. 2001. ISBN 978-0-14-101161-5
