= Gastone Sozzi Centuria =

- Commemorative flag of the unit
- Active: 3 September 1936 – 1938
- Country: (Kingdom of Italy) Italy
- Allegiance: Spain
- Type: Centuria - Infantry
- Role: Home Defence
- Size: 100
- Patron: Gastone Sozzi
- Engagements: Spanish Civil War: Battle of Madrid

The Gastone Sozzi Centuria (Spanish: Centuria Gastone Sozzi) was a Communist unit raised in Barcelona by Italian and Catalan volunteers who, at the beginning of the Spanish Civil War, went to the defence of Madrid, besieged by the Rebel Army. The name of the unit was in honour of Italian communist Gastone Sozzi, assassinated in 1928 by Fascist Blackshirts.

== History ==
After the Spanish coup of July 1936, which was seen by many anti-Fascist unions as a Fascist uprising against the democratically elected Republic, a series of Italian anti-Fascists departed to Barcelona from Paris, Lyon, Marseille, Grenoble and Saint-Etienne. On 2 September 1936, around eighty Italian volunteers arrived at the Carlos Marx Barracks in the city, including at least two elements of different nationalities and some athletes that had come to Barcelona to participate in the People's Olympiad. On 3 September, the column was officially established. Three groups of Italian volunteers had been created in Barcelona. The first, very small, left with the first columns of Catalan volunteers to the front. The other two gave rise to the Giustizia e Libertà Centuria, of Anarchist orientation, although directed by the Socialist Carlo Rosselli, and the Gastone Sozzi Centuria, with Gotardo Rinaldi as commander and Captain Francesco Leone as political commissar. The Gastone Sozzi Centuria, formed on 3 September, comprised 86 Italians, 29 Poles, 10 French, some Belgians and one Dane.

The Catalan authorities had planned the unit to go to the Aragon Front, but it was integrated into the PSUC Liberty Column as the 22nd Centuria of the unit. On 3 September the centuria was involved in trying to slow the Nationalist advance at Talavera. The centuria arrived in Madrid on 8 September, and quickly collaborated with the Fifth Regiment in the defence of the city. On 13 September, it was already fighting at the 1300 Hill, in Cenicientos, on the Extremadura Road. The centuria was framed as the 3nd Company of the Garibaldi Battalion on 10 October 1936. Between 16 and 18 October, they fought at Chapinería, before being sent to the base at Albacete. It was then attached, with mainly Italian volunteers, to the XI International Brigade on 22 October, and later the XII International Brigade.

== Personnel ==
- Francesco Leone - Captain, political commissar
- Gotardo Rinaldi - Commander
