= International Brigades =

Paramilitary supporting the Republicans in the Spanish Civil War

- Emblem of the International Brigades
- Active: 18 September 1936 – 23 September 1938
- Country: Spain; Multiple and others...
- Allegiance: Communist International; Second Spanish Republic
- Type: Infantry
- Role: Paramilitary
- Size: 32,000
- Garrison/HQ: Albacete
- Mottos: Por vuestra libertad y la nuestra; ("For your freedom and ours")
- Engagements: Spanish Civil War; Battle of Madrid; Battle of Lopera; Battle of Jarama; Battle of Guadalajara; Segovia Offensive; Huesca Offensive; Battle of Brunete; Battle of Belchite; Battle of Teruel; Aragon Offensive; Battle of Caspe; Battle of the Ebro

Commanders
- Notable commanders: André Marty; Manfred Stern; Hans Kahle; Luigi Longo; Karol Świerczewski; Tom Wintringham; Robert Hale Merriman; Máté Zalka; Wilhelm Zaisser; Bill Alexander; Veli Dedi; Valter Roman

Insignia
- Flag

The International Brigades (Spanish: Brigadas Internacionales) were volunteer soldiers organized by the Communist International to assist the Popular Front government of the Second Spanish Republic during the Spanish Civil War. The International Brigades existed for two years, from 1936 until 1938. It is estimated that during the entire war, there were some 32,000 Brigaders, yet at no single moment were there more than 18,000 actually deployed. Beyond the Spanish Civil War, "International Brigades" is also sometimes used interchangeably with the term foreign legion in reference to military units comprising foreigners who volunteer to fight in the military of another state, often in times of war.

The headquarters of the brigade was located at the Gran Hotel, Albacete, Castilla-La Mancha. They participated in the battles of Madrid, Jarama, Guadalajara, Brunete, Belchite, Teruel, Aragon, and the Ebro. Most of these ended in defeat. For the last year of its existence, the International Brigades were integrated into the Spanish Republican Army as part of the Spanish Foreign Legion. The organisation was dissolved on 23 September 1938 by Spanish Prime Minister Juan Negrín in a vain attempt to get more support from the liberal democracies on the Non-Intervention Committee.

The International Brigades were strongly supported by the Comintern and represented the Soviet Union's commitment to assisting the Spanish Republic (with arms, logistics, military advisers and the NKVD), just as Portugal, Fascist Italy, and Nazi Germany were assisting the opposing Nationalist insurgency. The largest number of volunteers came from France (where the French Communist Party had many members) and communist exiles from Italy and Germany. Many Jews were part of the brigades, being particularly numerous within the volunteers coming from the United States, Poland, Romania, France, Great Britain, and Argentina.

Republican volunteers who were opposed to Stalinism did not join the Brigades. Instead, they enlisted in the separate Popular Front, the POUM (formed from Trotskyist, Bukharinist, and other anti-Stalinist groups, which did not separate Spaniards and foreign volunteers), or anarcho-syndicalist groups such as the Durruti Column, the IWA, and the CNT.

== Formation and recruitment ==
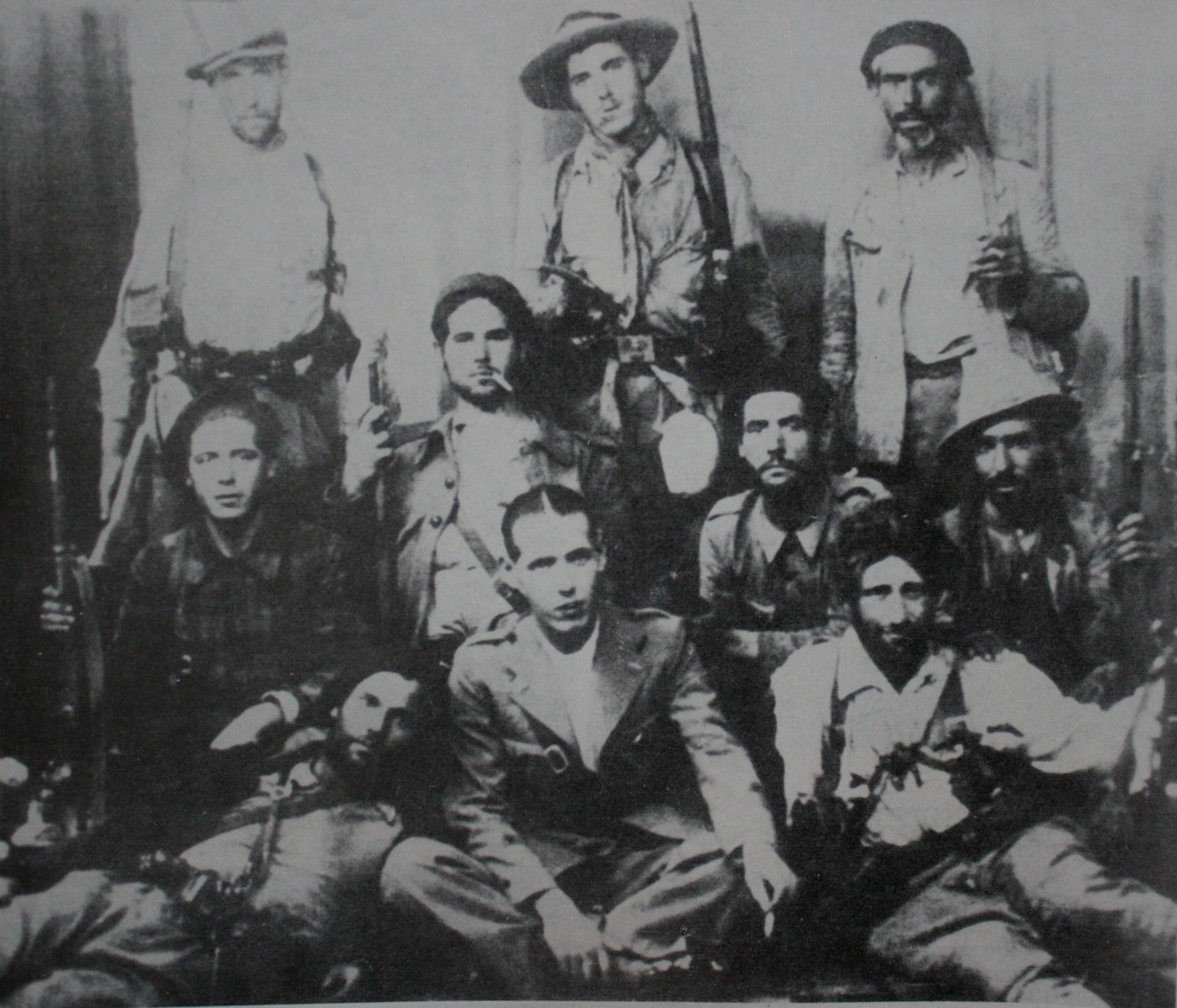
A unit of the Bulgarian International Brigade, 1937

Flag of the Hungarian Rakosi Group (part of the anarchist Iron Column).

Using foreign communist parties to recruit volunteers for Spain was first proposed in August 1936 by British writer and military theorist Tom Wintringham who had already travelled to Spain, but the idea was not formally raised with the Comintern in the Soviet Union until September 1936—apparently at the suggestion of Maurice Thorez—by Willi Münzenberg, chief of Comintern propaganda for Western Europe. One week after the London meeting of the Non-Intervention Committee confirmed that none of the Western democracies would provide military aid to the Spanish Republican side, the Comintern agreed to start recruiting international volunteers. As a security measure, non-communist volunteers would first be interviewed by an NKVD agent.

By the end of September, the British, Italian and French Communist Parties had decided to set up a column. Luigi Longo, ex-leader of the Italian Communist Youth, was charged to make the necessary arrangements with the Spanish government. The Soviet Ministry of Defense also helped, since they had experience dealing with the corps of international volunteers during the Russian Civil War. The idea was initially opposed by Francisco Largo Caballero, but after the first setbacks of the war, he changed his mind and finally agreed to the operation on 22 October. However, the Soviet Union did not withdraw from the Non-Intervention Committee, probably to avoid diplomatic conflict with France and the United Kingdom.

The main recruitment center was in Paris, under the supervision of Soviet colonel Karol "Walter" Świerczewski. On 17 October 1936, an open letter by Joseph Stalin to José Díaz was published in Mundo Obrero, arguing that victory for the Spanish second republic was a matter not only for Spaniards but also for the whole of "progressive humanity"; in short order, communist activists joined with moderate socialist and liberal groups to form anti-fascist "popular front" militias in several countries, most of them under the control of or influenced by the Comintern.

Entry to Spain was arranged for volunteers, for instance, a Yugoslav, Josip Broz, who would become famous as Marshal Tito, was in Paris to provide assistance, money, and passports for volunteers from Eastern Europe (including numerous Yugoslav volunteers in the Spanish Civil War). Volunteers were sent by train or ship from France to Spain, and sent to the base at Albacete. Many of them also went by themselves to Spain. The volunteers were under no contract, nor defined engagement period, which would later prove a problem.

Also, many Italians, Germans, and people from other countries joined the movement, with the idea that combat in Spain was the first step to restore democracy or advance a revolutionary cause in their own country. There were also many unemployed workers (especially from France), and adventurers. Finally, some 500 communists who had been exiled to Russia were sent to Spain (among them, experienced military leaders from the First World War like "Kléber" Stern, "Gomez" Zaisser, "Lukacs" Zalka and "Gal" Galicz, who would prove invaluable in combat).

The operation was met with enthusiasm by communists, but by anarchists with skepticism, at best. At first, the anarchists, who controlled the borders with France, were told to refuse communist volunteers, but reluctantly allowed their passage after protests. Keith Scott Watson, a journalist who fought alongside Esmond Romilly at Cerro de los Ángeles and who later "resigned" from the Thälmann Battalion, describes in his memoirs how he was detained and interrogated by Anarchist border guards before eventually being allowed into the country. A group of 500 volunteers (mainly French, with a few exiled Poles and Germans) arrived in Albacete on 14 October 1936. They were met by international volunteers who had already been fighting in Spain: Germans from the Thälmann Battalion, Italians from the Centuria Gastone Sozzi and French grouped together with Belgians under the Commune de Paris Battalion. Among them was the poet John Cornford, who had travelled down through France and Spain with a group of fellow intellectuals and artists including Wintringham, John Sommerfield, Bernard Knox, Ralph Bates and Jan Kurzke, all of whom left detailed memoirs of their battle experiences.

On 30 May 1937, the Spanish liner Ciudad de Barcelona, carrying 200–250 volunteers from Marseille to Spain, was torpedoed by a Nationalist submarine off the coast of Malgrat de Mar. The ship sank and up to 65 volunteers are estimated to have drowned.

Albacete soon became the International Brigades headquarters and its main depot. It was run by a troika of Comintern heavyweights: André Marty was commander; Luigi Longo (Gallo) was Inspector-General; and Giuseppe Di Vittorio (Nicoletti) was chief political commissar.

There were many Jewish volunteers amongst the brigadiers – about 22% of the total. This percentage depended on country, around 15% of French, 45% of Polish, 38% of American and 11-22% of British volunteers were Jewish.

A Jewish company was formed within the Polish battalion that was named after Naftali Botwin, a young Jewish communist killed in Poland in 1925.

The French Communist Party provided uniforms for the Brigades. They were organized into mixed brigades, the basic military unit of the Republican People's Army. Discipline was severe. For several weeks, the Brigades were locked in their base while their strict military training was underway.

== Service ==
=== First engagements: Siege of Madrid ===
The flag of the International Brigades was the Spanish Republican flag with the three-pointed star of the Popular Front in the center

The Battle of Madrid was a major success for the Republic, and staved off the prospect of a rapid defeat at the hands of Francisco Franco's forces. The role of the International Brigades in this victory was generally recognized but was exaggerated by Comintern propaganda so that the outside world heard only of their victories and not those of Spanish units. So successful was such propaganda that the British Ambassador, Sir Henry Chilton, declared that there were no Spaniards in the army which had defended Madrid. The International Brigade forces that fought in Madrid arrived after another successful Republican fighting. Of the 40,000 Republican troops in the city, the foreign troops numbered less than 3,000.

Even though the International Brigades did not win the battle by themselves, nor significantly change the situation, they certainly did provide an example by their determined fighting and improved the morale of the population by demonstrating the concern of other nations in the fight. Many of the older members of the International Brigades provided valuable combat experience, having fought during the First World War (Spain remained neutral in 1914–1918) and the Irish War of Independence (some had fought in the British Army while others had fought in the Irish Republican Army (IRA)).

One of the strategic positions in Madrid was the Casa de Campo. There the Nationalist troops were Moroccans, commanded by General José Enrique Varela. They were stopped by III and IV Brigades of the Spanish Republican Army.

On 9 November 1936, the XI International Brigade—comprising 1,900 men from the Edgar André Battalion, the Commune de Paris Battalion and the Dabrowski Battalion, together with a British machine-gun company—took up position at the Casa de Campo. In the evening, its commander, General Kléber, launched an assault on the Nationalist positions. This lasted for the whole night and part of the next morning. At the end of the fight, the Nationalist troops had been forced to retreat, abandoning all hopes of a direct assault on Madrid by Casa de Campo, while the XIth Brigade had lost a third of its personnel.

On 13 November, the 1,550-man strong XII International Brigade, made up of the Thälmann Battalion, the Garibaldi Battalion and the André Marty Battalion, deployed. Commanded by General "Lukacs", they assaulted Nationalist positions on the high ground of Cerro de Los Angeles. As a result of language and communication problems, command issues, lack of rest, poor coordination with armored units, and insufficient artillery support, the attack failed.

On 19 November, the anarchist militias were forced to retreat, and Nationalist troops—Moroccans and Spanish Foreign Legionnaires, covered by the Nazi Condor Legion—captured a foothold in the University City. The 11th Brigade was sent to drive the Nationalists out of the University City. The battle was extremely bloody, a mix of artillery and aerial bombardment, with bayonet and grenade fights, room by room. Anarchist leader Buenaventura Durruti was shot there on 19 November 1936 and died the next day. The battle in the university went on until three-quarters of the University City was under Nationalist control. Both sides then started setting up trenches and fortifications. It was then clear that any assault from either side would be far too costly; the Nationalist leaders had to renounce the idea of a direct assault on Madrid, and prepare for a siege of the capital.

On 13 December 1936, 18,000 nationalist troops attempted an attack to close the encirclement of Madrid at Guadarrama—an engagement known as the Battle of the Corunna Road. The Republicans sent in a Soviet armored unit, under General Dmitry Pavlov, and both XI and XII International Brigades. Violent combat followed, and they stopped the Nationalist advance.

An attack was then launched by the Republic on the Córdoba front. The battle ended in a form of stalemate; a communique was issued, saying: "During the day the advance continued without the loss of any territory." Poets Ralph Winston Fox and John Cornford were killed at the Battle of Lopera, as was Dubliner Tommy Wood, aged 17. Eventually, the Nationalists advanced, taking the hydroelectric station at El Campo. André Marty accused the commander of the Marseillaise Battalion, Gaston Delasalle, of espionage and treason and had him executed. (It is doubtful that Delasalle would have been a spy for Francisco Franco; he was denounced by his second-in-command, André Heussler, who was subsequently executed for treason during World War II by the French Resistance.)

Further Nationalist attempts after Christmas to encircle Madrid met with failure, but not without extremely violent combat. On 6 January 1937, the Thälmann Battalion arrived at Las Rozas and held its positions until it was destroyed as a fighting force. On 9 January, only 10 km had been lost to the Nationalists, when the XIII International Brigade and XIV International Brigade and the 1st British Company, arrived in Madrid. Violent Republican assaults were launched in an attempt to retake the land, with little success. On 15 January, trenches and fortifications were built by both sides, resulting in a stalemate.

The Nationalists did not take Madrid until the very end of the war, in March 1939, when they marched in unopposed. There were some pockets of resistance during the subsequent months.

=== Battle of Jarama ===
On 6 February 1937, following the fall of Málaga, the nationalists launched an attack on the Madrid–Andalusia road, south of Madrid. The Nationalists quickly advanced on the little town of Ciempozuelos, held by the XV International Brigade. was composed of the British Battalion (British Commonwealth and Irish), the Dimitrov Battalion (miscellaneous Balkan nationalities), the Sixth February Battalion (Belgians and French), the Canadian Mackenzie-Papineau Battalion and the Abraham Lincoln Brigade. An independent 80-men-strong (mainly) Irish unit, known afterward as the Connolly Column, also fought. Battalions were rarely composed entirely of one nationality, rather they were, for the most part, a mix of many.

On 11 February 1937, a Nationalist brigade launched a surprise attack on the André Marty Battalion (XIV International Brigade), killing its sentries silently and crossing the Jarama. The Garibaldi Battalion stopped the advance with heavy fire. At another point, the same tactic allowed the Nationalists to move their troops across the river. On 12 February, the British Battalion, XV International Brigade took the brunt of the attack, remaining under heavy fire for seven hours. The position became known as "Suicide Hill". At the end of the day, only 225 of the 600 members of the British battalion remained. One company was captured by ruse, when Nationalists advanced among their ranks singing The Internationale.

On 17 February, the Republican Army counterattacked. On 23 and 27 February, the International Brigades were engaged, but with little success. The Lincoln Battalion was put under great pressure, with no artillery support. It suffered 120 killed and 175 wounded. Amongst the dead was the Irish poet Charles Donnelly and Leo Greene.

There were heavy casualties on both sides, and although "both claimed victory ... both suffered defeats". The battle resulted in a stalemate, with both sides digging in and creating elaborate trench systems. On 22 February 1937, the League of Nations Non-Intervention Committee ban on foreign volunteers went into effect.

=== Battle of Guadalajara ===
Flag of Garibaldi battalion of the XII International Brigade, formed by italian volunteers

After the failed assault on the Jarama, the Nationalists attempted another assault on Madrid, this time from the northeast. The objective was the town of Guadalajara, 50 km from Madrid. The whole Italian expeditionary corps—35,000 men, with 80 battle tanks and 200 field artillery—was deployed, as Benito Mussolini wanted the victory to be credited to Italy. On 9 March 1937, the Italians made a breach in the Republican lines but did not properly exploit the advance. However, the rest of the Nationalist army was advancing, and the situation appeared critical for the Republicans. A formation drawn from the best available units of the Republican army, including the XI and XII International Brigades, was quickly assembled.

At dawn on 10 March, the Nationalists closed in, and by noon, the Garibaldi Battalion counterattacked. Some confusion arose from the fact that the sides were not aware of each other's movements, and that both sides spoke Italian; this resulted in scouts from both sides exchanging information without realizing they were enemies. The Republican lines advanced and made contact with XI International Brigade. Nationalist tanks were shot at and infantry patrols came into action.

On 11 March, the Nationalist army broke the front of the Republican army. The Thälmann Battalion suffered heavy losses but succeeded in holding the Trijueque–Torija road. The Garibaldi also held its positions. On 12 March, Republican planes and tanks attacked. The Thälmann Battalion attacked Trijuete in a bayonet charge and re-took the town, capturing numerous prisoners.

=== Other battles ===
The International Brigades also saw combat in the Battle of Teruel in January 1938. The 35th International Division suffered heavily in this battle from aerial bombardment as well as shortages of food, winter clothing, and ammunition. The XIV International Brigade fought in the Battle of Ebro in July 1938, the last Republican offensive of the war.

== Casualties ==
Existing primary sources provide conflicting information as to the number of brigadiers killed; a report of the IB Albacete staff from late March 1938 claimed 4,575 KIA, an internal Soviet communication to Moscow by an NKVD major Semyon Gendin from late July 1938 claimed 3,615 KIA, while the prime minister Juan Negrín in his farewell address in Barcelona of October 28, 1938, mentioned 5,000 fallen.

Also, in historiography there is no agreement as to fatal casualties. The highest estimate identified is 15,000 KIA. Many scholars prefer 10,000, also in recently published works. One exact figure offered is 9,934; it was calculated in the mid-1970s and is at times repeated until today. The popular Osprey series claims there were at least 7,800 killed. However, other authors provide estimates that point rather to the range from 6,100 to 6,500; one author claims 6,000. In some non-scholarly publications the number is given as 4,900 and in some older monographic accounts as 4,000. The above figures include brigadiers killed in action, these who died of wounds later or those who were executed as POWs; they include also few hundred volunteers who perished before reaching Spain. They include also brigadiers who were executed by their own side, the figure that some claim might have been 500; they also do include victims of accidents (self-shooting, traffic, drownings etc.) or these who perished due to health problems (illness, frostbite, poisoning etc.).

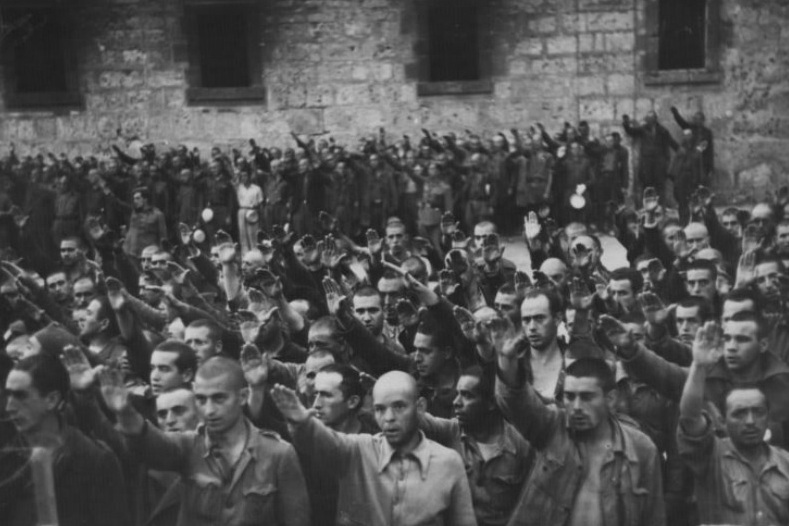
POW brigadiers in Cardeña give the fascist salute, October 1938

The total number of casualties is given as 48,909, 55,162 or 59,380. It includes killed, missing and wounded, though probably contains numerous duplicated/multiplicated cases, as one individual might have suffered wounds a few times; it also includes Spaniards, who at later stages formed over 50% of the IB personnel. The missing contain the category of POW; their total figure is unknown, yet estimates as to the number of interbrigadistas held prisoner in the key prison camp for foreign combatants, located in San Pedro de Cardeña, exceed 700. A work from the mid-1970s claimed that there were 7,686 MIA (incl. POW and deserters), 29,802 lightly wounded, and 7,739 heavily wounded.

The ratio of KIA to all IB combatants as calculated by historians might differ even more as it depends not only on estimates as to the number of killed, but also on estimates as to the total number of volunteers. Some sources suggest the figure of 8.3%, some authors claim 15%, others opt for 16.8%, estimate 20% or 21%, prefer 24.7% or endorse the ratio of 28.6%; a single author arrived at 33% and one claims "a half". In comparison, in shock units used by the Nationalists, though they were not entirely comparable, the ratio was 11.3% for the Carlist requetés and 14.6% for the Moroccan regulares. The overall percentage of killed in action in armies of both sides is estimated at some 7%.

Estimates of KIA ratio for major national contingents differ enormously. They often bear no reasonable relation to the overall KIA ratio, calculated for the Brigades, and figures provided by historians from respective countries are usually way above those advanced by scholars from elsewhere. For volunteers from Latin America (mostly Cubans, Argentinians, and Mexicans) the figures range between 11% and 13%, for the Romanians 16-18%, for the Czechs/Slovaks 17%, for the Italians between 18% and 20%; for the British between 16% and 23%; for the French (including French-speaking Belgians and Swiss) between 12% and 30%; for the Americans between 13% and 32%; for the Yugoslavs between 35% and 50%, for the Canadians between 43% and 57%, for the Germans (including Austrians and German-speaking Swiss) between 22% and 60%; for the Poles (including Ukrainians, Jews, Belarusians) between 30% and 62%. Among smaller contingents, the KIA ratio calculated appears to be 10% for the Cubans, 18% for the Austrians, 21% for the Balts (Estonians, Latvians, Lithuanians), 21–25% for the Swiss, 31% for the Finns, 13–33% for the Greeks, 23–35% for the Swedes, 40% for the Danes, and 44% for the Norwegians. In case of some minuscule national contingents, e.g. the Australians, the ratio of KIA appears to be some 21–22%.

== Disbandment ==
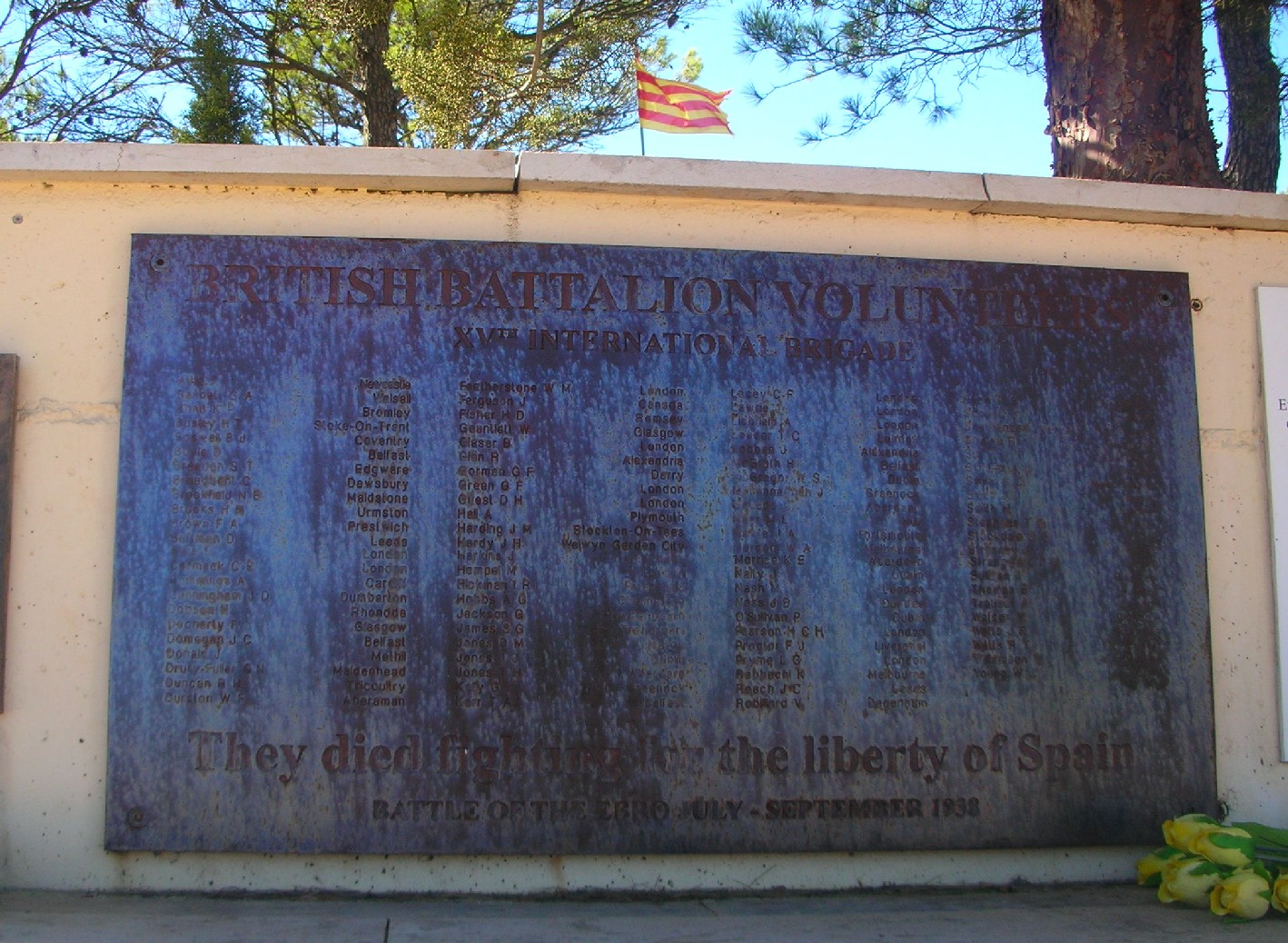
Bronze plaque honoring the British soldiers of the International Brigades who died defending the Spanish Republic at the monument on Hill 705, Serra de Pàndols.

In October 1938, at the height of the Battle of the Ebro, the Non-Intervention Committee demanded the withdrawal of the International Brigades. The Republican government of Juan Negrín announced the decision in the League of Nations on 21 September 1938. The disbandment was part of an ill-advised effort to get the Nationalists' foreign backers to withdraw their troops and to persuade the Western democracies such as France and Britain to end their arms embargo on the Republic.

By this time there were about an estimated 10,000 foreign volunteers still serving in Spain for the Republican side, and about 50,000 foreign conscripts for the Nationalists (excluding another 30,000 Moroccans). Perhaps half of the International Brigadistas were exiles or refugees from Nazi Germany, Fascist Italy or other countries, such as Hungary, which had authoritarian right-wing governments at the time. These men could not safely return home, and some were instead given honorary Spanish citizenship and integrated into Spanish units of the Popular Army. The remainder were repatriated to their own countries. The Belgian and Dutch volunteers lost their citizenship because they had served in a foreign army.

== Composition ==
=== Overview ===
The first brigades were composed mostly of French, Belgian, Italian, and German volunteers, backed by a sizeable contingent of Polish miners from Northern France and Belgium. The XIth, XIIth and XIIIth were the first brigades formed. Later, the XIVth and XVth Brigades were raised, mixing experienced soldiers with new volunteers. Smaller Brigades — the 86th, 129th and 150th – were formed in late 1937 and 1938, mostly for temporary tactical reasons.

About 32,000 foreigners volunteered to defend the Spanish Republic, the vast majority of them with the International Brigades. Many were veterans of World War I. Their early engagements in 1936 during the Siege of Madrid amply demonstrated their military and propaganda value.

The international volunteers were mainly socialists, communists, or others willing to accept communist authority, and a high proportion were Jewish. Some were involved in the Barcelona May Days fighting against leftist opponents of the Communists: the Workers' Party of Marxist Unification (POUM) (Partido Obrero de Unificación Marxista, an anti-Stalinist Marxist party) and the anarchist CNT (CNT, Confederación Nacional del Trabajo) and FAI (FAI, Iberian Anarchist Federation), who had strong support in Catalonia. These libertarian groups attracted fewer foreign volunteers.

To simplify communication, the battalions usually concentrated on people of the same nationality or language group. The battalions were often (formally, at least) named after inspirational people or events. From spring 1937 onwards, many battalions contained one Spanish volunteer company of about 150 men.

Later in the war, military discipline tightened and learning Spanish became mandatory. By decree of 23 September 1937, the International Brigades formally became units of the Spanish Foreign Legion. This made them subject to the Spanish Code of Military Justice. However, the Spanish Foreign Legion itself sided with the Nationalists throughout the coup and the civil war. The same decree also specified that non-Spanish officers in the Brigades should not exceed Spanish ones by more than 50 percent. Also, the decree ruled that there must be a Spanish battalion in every international brigade, a Spanish company in every battalion, and a Spanish section in every company.

=== Non-Spanish battalions ===
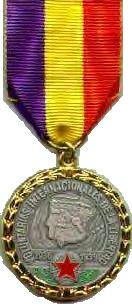
Spanish Civil War Medal awarded to the International Brigades

- Abraham Lincoln Battalion – from the United States and Canada, with some British, Cypriots, and Chileans from the Chilean Worker Club of New York.
  - Connolly Column – a mostly Irish Republican group who fought as a section of the Lincoln Battalion.
- Mickiewicz Battalion – predominantly Polish.
- André Marty Battalion – predominantly French and Belgian.
- British Battalion – mainly British but with many from Ireland, Australia, New Zealand, South Africa, Cyprus, and other Commonwealth countries.
- Checo-Balcánico Battalion – Czechoslovak and Balkan.
- Commune de Paris Battalion – predominantly French and Belgian. Also included volunteers from Britain, the United States, and New Zealand.
- Deda Blagoev Battalion – predominantly Bulgarian, later merged into the Đaković Battalion. Named after Dimitar Blagoev.
- Dimitrov Battalion – Greek, Yugoslav, Bulgarian, Czechoslovak, Hungarian, and Romanian (named after Georgi Dimitrov).
- Đuro Đaković Battalion – Yugoslav, Bulgarian, anarchist, named for former Yugoslav Communist Party secretary Djuro Đaković.
- Dabrowski Battalion – mostly Polish and Hungarian, also Czechoslovak, Ukrainian, Bulgarian, and Palestinian Jews.
- Edgar André Battalion – mostly German, also Austrian, Yugoslav, Bulgarian, Albanian, Romanian, Danish, Swedish, Norwegian, and Dutch.
- Español Battalion – Mexican, Cuban, Puerto Rican, Chilean, Argentine, and Bolivian.
- Figlio Battalion – mostly Italian; later merged with the Garibaldi Battalion.
- Garibaldi Battalion – raised as the Italoespañol Battalion and renamed. Mostly Italian and Spanish but contained some Albanians. In April 1937, it became a brigade.
- George Washington Battalion – the second U.S. battalion. Later merged with the Lincoln Battalion, to form the Lincoln-Washington Battalion.
- Hans Beimler Battalion – mostly German; later merged with the Thälmann Battalion.
- Henri Barbusse Battalion – predominantly French.
- Henri Vuilleman Battalion – predominantly French.
- Italian Column (Matteotti Battalion) – predominantly Italian and the first international group to reach Spain.
- Louise Michel Battalions – French-speaking, later merged with the Henri Vuillemin Battalion.
- Mackenzie–Papineau Battalion – the "Mac-Paps", predominantly Canadian.
  - Ilkka Machine Gun Company – a unit of Finnish Canadians that was attached to the Mackenzie–Papineau Battalion
- Marseillaise Battalion – predominantly French, commanded by George Nathan.
  - Incorporated one separate British company.
- Palafox Battalion – Yugoslav, Polish, Czechoslovak, Hungarian, Jewish, and French.
  - Naftali Botwin Company – a Jewish unit formed within the Palafox Battalion in December 1937.
- Pierre Brachet Battalion – mostly French.
- Rakosi Battalion – mainly Hungarian, also Czechoslovak, Ukrainian, Polish, Chinese, Mongolian, and Palestinian Jewish.
- Nine Nations Battalion (also known as the Sans nons and Neuf Nationalités) – French, Belgian, Italian, German, Austrian, Dutch, Danish, Swiss, and Polish.
- Sixth of February Battalion – French, Belgian, Moroccan, Algerian, Libyan, Syrian, Iranian, Iraqi, Egyptian, Chinese, Japanese, Indian, Filipino, and Palestinian Jewish.
- Thälmann Battalion – predominantly German, named after German communist leader Ernst Thälmann.
  - Tom Mann Centuria – a small, mostly British, group who operated as a section of the Thälmann Battalion.
- Thomas Masaryk Battalion: mostly Czechoslovak.
- Chapaev Battalion – composed of 21 nationalities (Ukrainian, Polish, Czechoslovak, Bulgarian, Yugoslavian, Turkish, Italian, German, Austrian, Finnish, Swedish, Norwegian, Danish, Belgian, French, Greek, Albanian, Dutch, Swiss, Lithuanian, and Estonian).
- Vaillant-Couturier Battalion – French, Belgian, Czechoslovak, Bulgarian, Swedish, Norwegian, and Danish.
- Veinte Battalion – American, British, Italian, Yugoslav, and Bulgarian.
- Zwölfte Februar Battalion – mostly Austrian.
- Company De Zeven Provinciën – Dutch.

=== Brigadistas by country of origin ===
The below table reflects citizenship rather than the country of recruitment. Probably more than 50% of all volunteers were recruited in France; apart from Frenchmen, they were either economic migrants, political refugees or both. Most volunteers holding citizenship of Germany, Italy, and Eastern European countries (Poland, Yugoslavia, Czechoslovakia, Hungary) were recruited in Western Europe.

Country	Estimate	Notes
France	8,962–9,000	
Italy	3,000–3,350	
Germany	3,000–5,000 Beevor quotes 2,217 Germans and 872 Austrians.	
Austria	3,000–5,000 Beevor quotes 2,217 Germans and 872 Austrians.	Austrian Resistance documents name 1,400 Austrians. Annexed in 1938 by Germany.
Poland	500–5,000	International historiography tends to hover around the figure of 3,000 "Poles". It includes migrants from Poland but recruited in France and Belgium, who made up some 75% of the Polish contingent; it also includes volunteers of Belarusian, Ukrainian and especially Jewish origin; the latter might have accounted for 45% of all volunteers classified as "Poles".
United Kingdom	2,500	
United States	2,341–2,800	
Czechoslovakia	2,200	Some 20% of volunteers from Czechoslovakia were Germans, and some 11% were Hungarians
Yugoslavia	1,900–2,095	
Belgium	1,600–1,722	
Canada	1,546–2,000	Thomas estimates 1,000.
Cuba	1,101	
Argentina	740	
Netherlands	628–691	
Denmark	550	220 died.
Hungary	528–1,500	Some 200 Hungarian volunteers came from Czechoslovakia, almost 100 from Romania, and almost 100 from Canada
Sweden	500	Est. 799–1,000 from Scandinavia (of whom 500 were Swedes).
Romania	400	Contemporary scholars fail to identify the national identity of 36% of volunteers associated with Romania; 24% were Jews, 24% were Hungarians, and only 13% are confirmed as Romanians
Bulgaria	462	
Switzerland	408–800	
Lithuania	300–600	
Ireland	250	Split between the British Battalion and the Lincoln Battalion which included the famed Connolly Column.
Norway	225	100 died.
Finland	225	Including 78 Finnish Americans and 73 Finnish Canadians, ca. 70 died.
Estonia	200	
Greece	290–400	
Portugal	134	Due to the geographic and linguistic proximity most Portuguese volunteers joined the Republican forces directly and not the International Brigades (such is the case of Emídio Guerreiro and that was the plan of the failed 1936 Naval Revolt). At the time it was estimated that about 2,000 Portuguese fought on the Republican side, spread throughout different units (estimate of Jaime Cortesão).
Luxembourg	103	Livre historiographic d'Henri Wehenkel – D'Spueniekämfer (1997)
Republic of China	100	Organised by the Chinese Communist Party, members were mostly overseas Chinese led by Xie Weijin.
Mexico	90	
Cyprus	60	
Australia	60	16 killed.
Philippines	50	
Albania	43	Organised in the "Garibaldi Battalion" together with Italians. They were led by the Kosovar revolutionary Asim Vokshi.
Costa Rica	24	
New Zealand	20	Mixed into British units.
Others	1,122	According to some sources, there were between 8,000 and 10,000 Jews among all volunteers, mostly from Poland, the USA and France. This would make them the second largest or even the largest national group

== Status after the war ==
After the Civil War was eventually won by the Nationalists, the brigaders were initially on the "wrong side" of history, especially as most of their home countries had right-wing governments (in France, for instance, the Popular Front was not in power anymore). However, since most of these countries soon found themselves at war with the very powers which had been supporting the Nationalists, the brigadistas gained some prestige as the first guard of the democracies, as having foreseen the danger of fascism and gone to fight it. Some glory therefore accrued to the volunteers (a great many of the survivors also fought during World War II), but this soon faded in the fear that it would promote communism by association.

The highest-ranking post-war IB combatant was Koča Popović, who briefly served as the vice-president of Yugoslavia (1966–1967). Two became prime ministers: Mehmet Shehu (Albania, 1954–1981) and Ferenc Münnich (Hungary, 1958–1961), while Heinrich Rau was the chairman of DWK, sort of government of what would become East Germany (1948–1949). There were three deputy prime ministers: Petre Borilă (Romania, 1954–1965), Eugeniusz Szyr (Poland, 1959–1972), and Pietro Nenni (Italy, 1963–1968); Rodoljub Čolaković served as prime minister of Bosnia and Hercegovina, the federative component of Yugoslavia (1945–1948). In communist countries tens of ex-combatants served as ministers (e.g. Karlo Lukanov in Bulgaria, Josef Pavel in Czechoslovakia, Gheorghe Vasilichi in Romania, Ernő Gerő in Hungary, Maks Baće in Yugoslavia), or held other key state jobs, especially in the army and security (e.g. Erich Mielke in East Germany). In the West the only person holding a ministerial job identified was Nenni, though Lou Lichtveld was minister in the Dutch-dependent Surinam. In the West few became senators, like Armando Fedeli (Italy, 1948–1958) and Raymond Guyeot (France, 1959–1977), and a handful served as members of lower houses in their national parliaments, especially in France (e.g. Auguste Lecœur in 1945–1955) and Italy (e.g. Aristodemo Maniera in 1948–1958); however, the highest-ranking combatant in national legislative was Ferdinand Kozovski, the longtime chairman of the National Assembly of Bulgaria (1949–1965). Beyond the official state structures single individuals grew to high political positions: in the mid-1970s Jack Jones as General Secretary of General Workers Union was considered the most powerful person in Britain.

=== Canada ===
Survivors of the Mackenzie-Papineau Battalion were often investigated by the Royal Canadian Mounted Police (RCMP) and denied employment when they returned to Canada. Many "Mac-Pap" veterans volunteered to fight in World War II, but some were rejected as "politically unreliable" due to their communist backgrounds.

In 1995, a monument to Canadian soldiers in the Spanish Civil War was built near Ontario's provincial parliament. On 12 February 2000, a bronze statue, "The Spirit of the Republic" by sculptor Jack Harman, based on a poster from the Spanish Republic, was placed on the grounds of the British Columbia Legislature. In 2001, the few surviving Canadian veterans of the Spanish Civil War dedicated a monument in Ottawa's Green Island Park to their country's International Brigaders.

=== East Germany ===
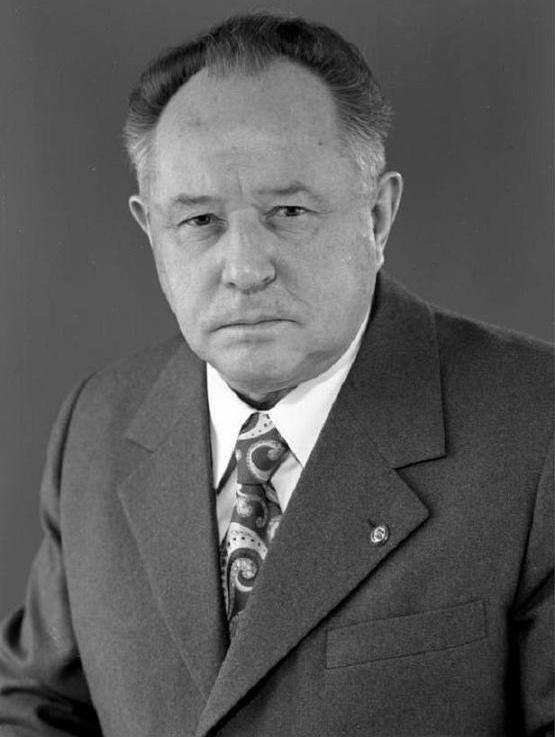
Erich Mielke, most powerful DDR combatant

Probably in no country of the world did the International Brigades combatants enjoy the prestige comparable to that bestowed on them in East Germany. Though after 1945, they were celebrated in all communist states as freedom fighters against fascism, their position was secondary and the official narrative centred upon other threads, e.g. the USSR-raised army in Poland, the Slovak National Uprising in Czechoslovakia, or the partisan quasi-state in Yugoslavia. No such narrative was available in the case of East Germany, whose “communist government found itself without historical roots beyond the Soviet occupation of Eastern Europe and turned the heroism of the Spanish Civil War fighters into the myth that became a central focus of the German Democratic Republic”. Factional purges of the early 1950s affected German veterans (e.g. the cases of Franz Dahlem or Wilhelm Zaisser) far less than e.g. in Czechoslovakia, though some “Brigaders faced an uncertain existence as they navigated the tortuous political hairpin curves of life under Stalinism and the continual and often critical need for political realignment”. No deviation from official line was allowed; the portrait of IB as in For Whom the Bell Tolls was considered unacceptable and the novel remained black-listed until the late 1960.

Like in other communist countries, the IB veterans – usually referred to as Spanienkämpfer – were overrepresented in power structures. They took three of the most important military posts: Heinz Hoffmann as commander of Nationale Volksarmee, Erich Mielke as head of Ministry for Security, and Friedrich Dickel as Minister of Interior. Many held other key posts in army and security, e.g. Herbert Grünstein was Deputy Minister of the Interior while Ewald Munschke became chief of administration in NVA. There were 10 former interbrigadistas who entered the Political Bureau of Sozialistische Einheitspartei Deutschlands, some briefly (e.g. Anton Ackermann, Dahlem or Zaisser) and some for decades (e.g. Paul Verner, Kurt Hager and Alfred Neumann). Numerous ex-combatants assumed high positions in media. The list of veterans who “rose to the highest ranks in the East German government runs into hundreds”.

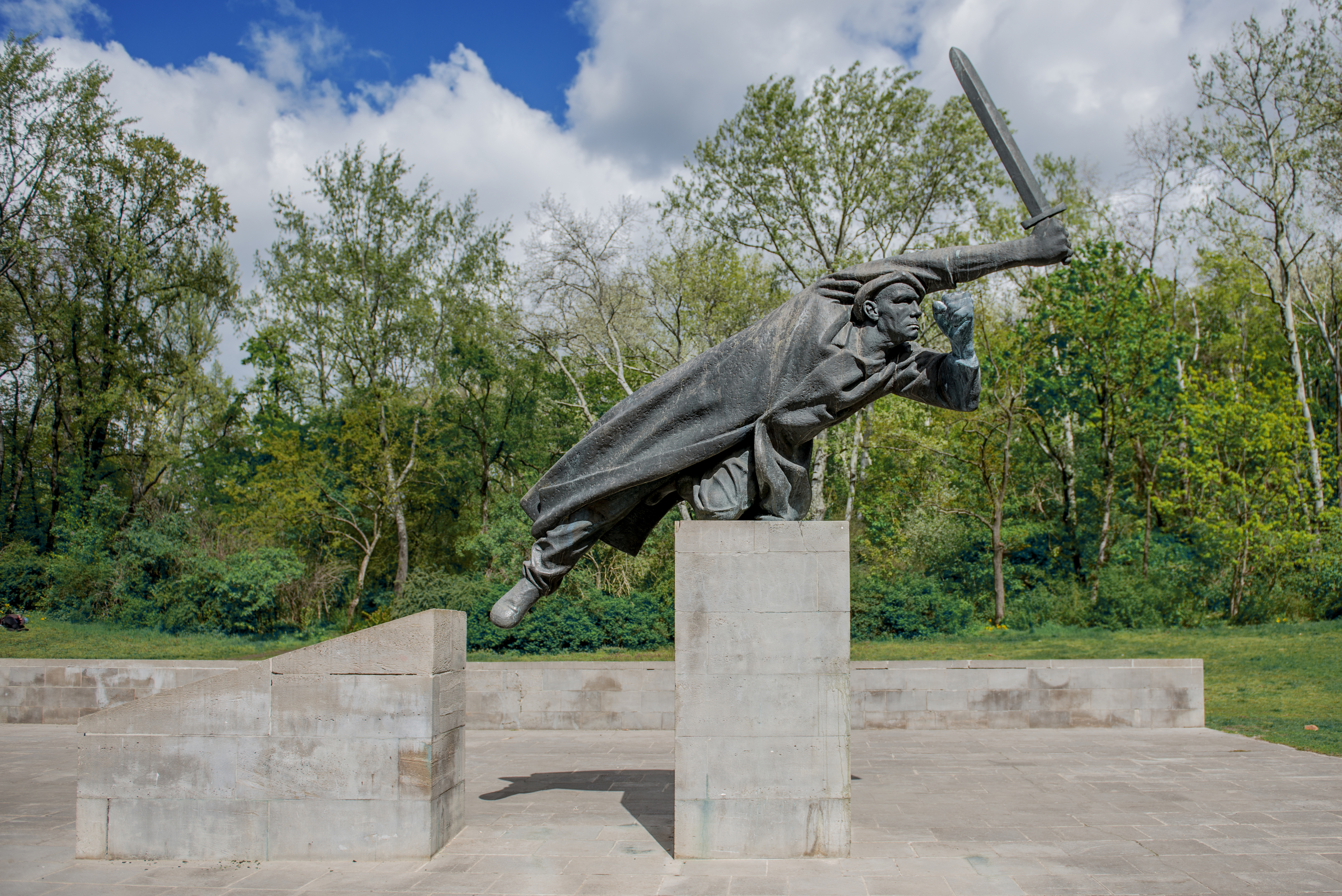
Spanienkämpfer monument, Berlin

German participation in the International Brigades remained the ideological historiographic backbone of DDR until its collapse. East Germany itself officially acknowledged that “the German-speaking units of the International Brigades represented the nucleus of the armed forces of the future GDR”. Books by Ludwig Renn became standard works and at times obligatory reading. Numerous streets, schools, bridges, factories and troop units were named after the Spanienkämpfer; in 1968 they were dedicated a monument, unveiled in East Berlin. Attempts to challenge the propagandistic use of German IB history, like the 1979 novel Collin by Stefan Heym, remained isolated episodes with no major impact. The 1986 fiftieth anniversary of the outbreak of the war saw another outpouring of adulation, even though over time the volunteers “became cardboard figures which mirrored the ossification of the State itself”. However, only a few days before the fall of the Berlin Wall, on November 5, 1989, Walter Janka appeared at a public reading of his memoirs to an overflow crowd at the Deutsches Theater. The event was broadcast live on radio and shown later on television.

=== Czechoslovakia ===
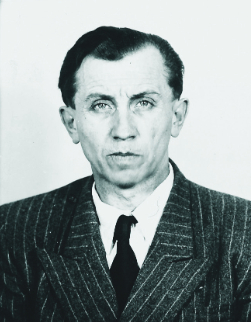
Josef Pavel, highest-ranking IB combatant

Most Czechoslovak volunteers remained in France, either in internment camps or where they had been recruited earlier; in 1939–1940 many got enlisted in troops, raised by the exile Czechoslovak government. Later their fate differed: some served in Czechoslovak units raised in Britain, some were members of French resistance, some returned home, and some ended up in concentration camps.

In re-born Czechoslovakia, the Interbrigadistas, known as španěláci, were granted ex-combatant rights. They were overrepresented in KSČ-controlled power structures (army, public order, security, intelligence). Some of them – like Pavel – were instrumental when carrying out the coup of February 1948. The Security Five, key men controlling security institutions – was composed of former IB volunteers: Pavel, Hofman, Hromádko, Valeš and Závodský. Some rose to deputy ministers (London and Dufek in foreign affairs, Hušek in information and Kriegel in health).

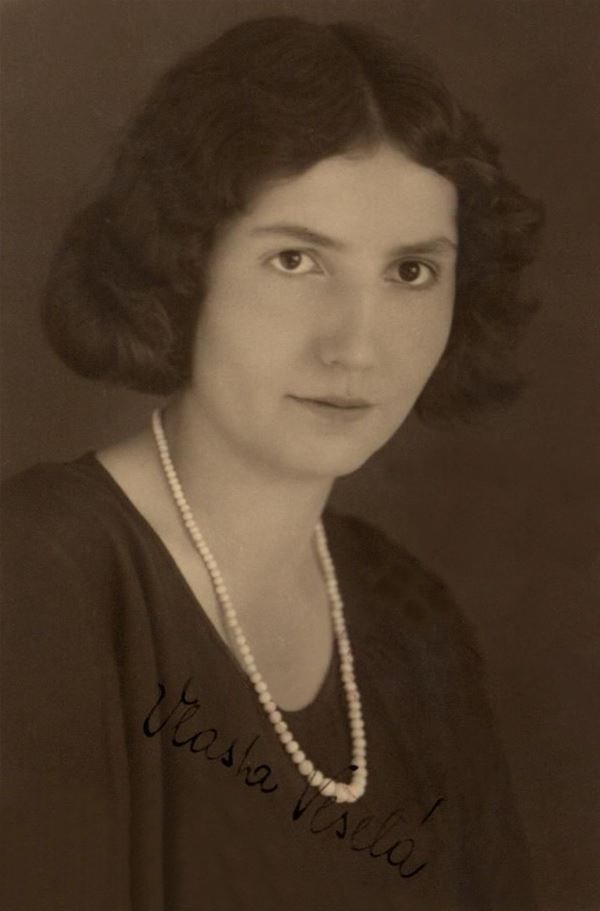
Vlasta Veselá, possibly tortured to death

At the turn of the decades a drastic wave of political purges heavily affected the former Interbrigadistas. Almost all lost their posts and many underwent brutal interrogation; Veselá died in prison. In the early 1950s there was a show-trial planned, intended to denounce "International Brigades as a Trotskyist-Titoist gang", though eventually most prison sentences were delivered during small-scale trials. In 1952 Otto Šling was executed as an enemy spy.

Following another political change in 1956 those still behind bars were set free and gradually re-admitted to public administration. The 1960s was the golden era for Czechoslovak IB combatants, hailed as the first ones who confronted Fascism. Some (Holdoš, Kriegel, Falbra) took advantage of their linguistic skills and were despatched as advisors to Castro's Cuba. Politically the Czechoslovak Interbrigadistas tended to support the reformist wing of KSČ. Few rose to top positions, e.g. in 1968 Kriegel became chairman of the National Front, and Pavel assumed the ministry of interior.

The invasion of 1968 marked another downturn; most of these at high positions were dismissed, though there was no wave of heavy repression. Some resigned (Pavel, Holdoš), few left for exile (Hromádko) and some were involved in dissident movement (Kriegel). After 1989 there was some confusion in both Czechia and Slovakia as to how the IB veterans should be approached, though the controversy was not comparable to the similar one in Poland; eventually the image which seems to prevail is this of anti-fascist combatants. In 2016 the Czech minister of defense Kühnl awarded commemorative medals to last living Interbrigadistas. A 2021 monograph presents the španěláci in balanced, but somewhat sympathetic terms.

=== Poland ===
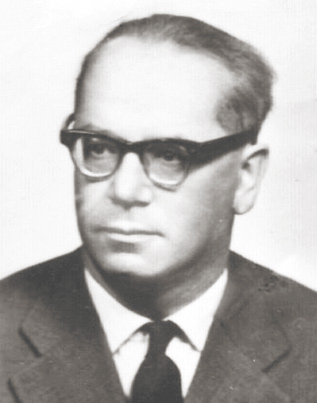
Eugeniusz Szyr, highest-ranking IB combatant

In line with the 1920 legislation, Polish citizens who volunteered to the IB were automatically stripped of citizenship as individuals who without formal approval served in foreign armed forces. Following republican defeat the combatants recruited in France and Belgium returned there. Among the others some served in pro-Communist partisan units in the German-occupied Poland, while some made it to the USSR and served in the pro-Communist Polish army raised there.

In the Communist Poland the IB combatants – referred to as Dąbrowszczacy – were granted veteran rights and formed an own ex-combatant organisation, later to be amalgamanted into a general one. There were some 750–800 of them registered. In the early post-war period they enjoyed some official exaltation; the group was supported by Karol Świerczewski, in Spain a career Soviet commander who during few strings commanded IB units. Some assumed high positions in administration, but they were heavily overrepresented in power structures (army, security); some departments became their fiefdoms, like counter-intelligence branch of the army. During purges of the early 1950s there were also cases of deposition, arrest and prison on trumped-up charges of political conspiracy; these were released in the mid-1950s.

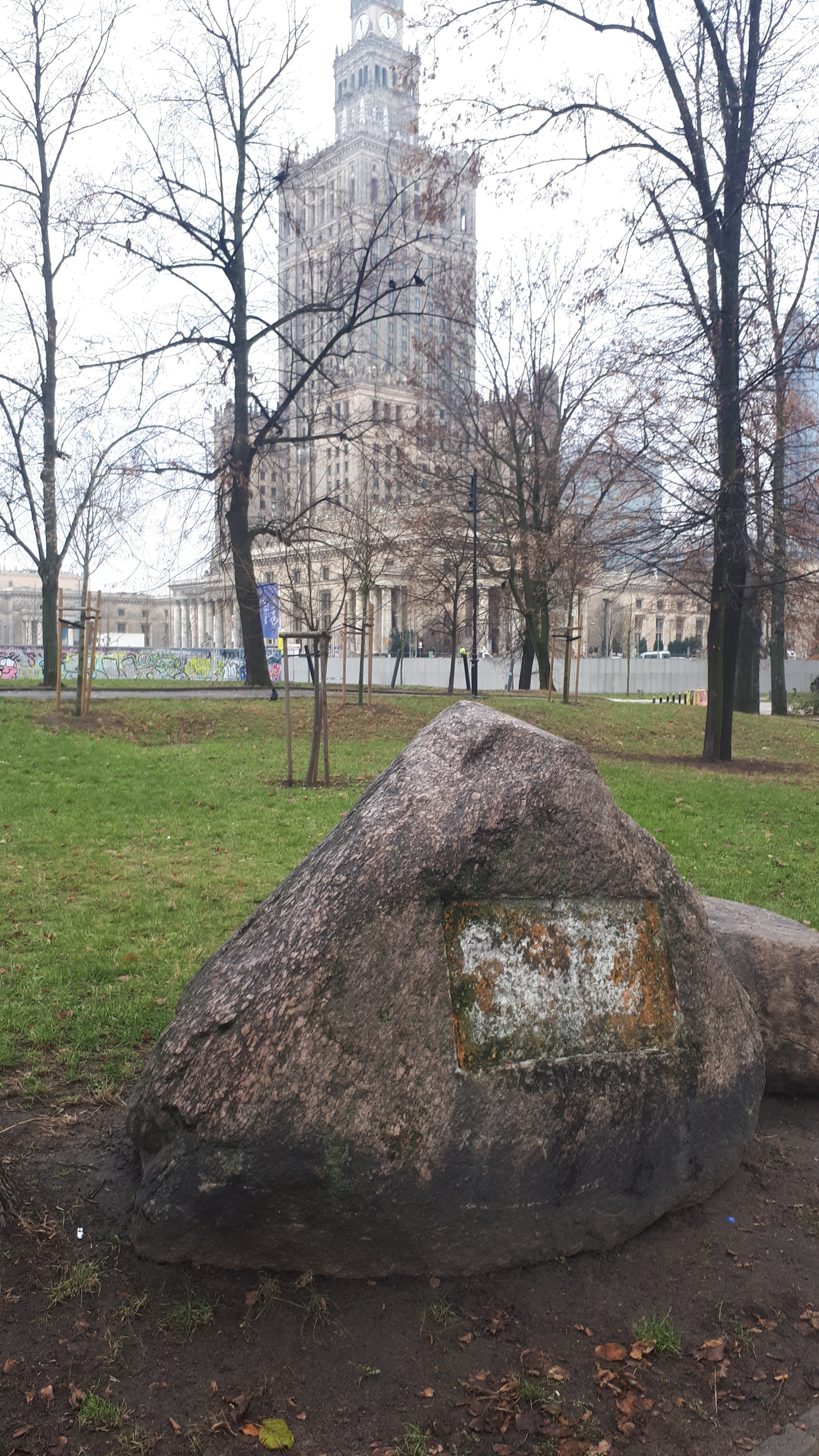
Warsaw, stone after vandalised and removed plaque, honoring IB men

Though from the onset Polish engagement in IB was hailed as "working class taking to arms against Fascism", the most intense idolization took place between the mid-1950s and the mid-1960s, with a spate of publications, schools and streets named after Dąbrowszczacy. However, an antisemitic turn in the late 1960s again produced de-emphasizing of IB volunteers, many of whom left Poland. Until the end of Communist rule the IB episode was duly acknowledged, but propaganda related was a far cry from veneration reserved for wartime Communist partisans or the USSR-raised Polish army. Despite some efforts on part of IB combatants, no monument has been erected. Unlike in East Germany, except Szyr no-one made it to the very top strata of the Communist elite (member of Political Bureau of PZPR, minister). Unlike in Czechoslovakia or Yugoslavia, no IB combatant became a recognizable figure of political opposition, though some deviated somewhat from the official party line and numerous potential dissidents left the country during anti-semitic purges in 1968–1969.

After 1989 it was unclear whether Dąbrowszczacy were furtherly entitled to veteran privileges; the issue generated political debates until they became pointless, as almost all IB combatants had died. Another question was about homage references, existent in public space. A state-run institution IPN declared Polish IB combatants in service of the Stalinist regime and related homage references subject to de-communisation legislation. However, efficiency of purges of public space differs depending upon local political configuration and occasionally there is heated public debate ensuing; in some cases there was conflict between regional and municipal authorities, one trying to overrule another. Until today the role of Polish IB combatants remains a highly divisive topic; for some they are traitors and for some they are heroes. In post-Communist Poland they gained few scientific articles, yet no larger scientific monograph on Dąbrowszczacy has been published.

=== Romania ===
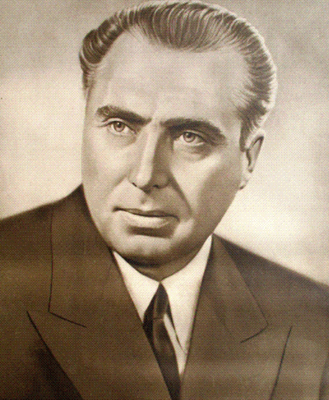
Petre Borilă, highest-ranking IB combatant

Some 300 Romanian volunteers, mostly stripped of citizenship, survived the Spanish war, and around 110 made it to the post-1944 Romania. Many were key to stabilisation of the regime. Some (Burcă, Borilă, Stoica) manned key positions in Tudor Vladimirescu Division, key to Communist takeover; others (Coloman, Patriciu, Câmpeanu) headed 3 regional branches of DGSP, while Roman served as the Chief of Staff. The wave of purges starting the late 1940s was relatively mild; by default interbrigadistas appeared before party investigative commissions; some were posted to second-rate positions, yet cases of arrest were few. The most dramatic was this of Stelian Mircea; until 1954 he spent years in labor camps. Most returned to positions of power, though not at the previous level. At the turn of the 50/60s factionalist struggle in PMR produced new purges (Botnar, Doncea, Tismăneanu). In the mid-1960s most highly-positioned interbrigadistas adopted well to emergence of Ceaușescu, even though some (Borilă) – were increasingly at odds with his new, "national" line, and few remained monitored by Securitate. In the 1970s most IB men retired, and few retained ceremonial positions in the 1980s.

The two interbrigadistas who made it to Politbureau were Vasilichi and Borilă, though around 10 more entered the party Central Committee. In the government, Borilă served as deputy PM and ministerial posts were held by Vasilichi (education, mines and oil), Roman (telecoms), Florescu (chemical industry, oil industry), and Doncea (harvest). Roman was Chief of Staff while Burcă headed key departments in Interior. Stoica served as secretary to praesidium of Great National Assembly and held other apparently technical jobs, yet in the late 40s he was feared as „viceregele României”. Two more individuals were notorious otherwise: Tismăneanu emerged as key ideologue, dubbed "apostle of Stalin", while Gheza Vida was famous as a sculptor, author of monumental constructions.

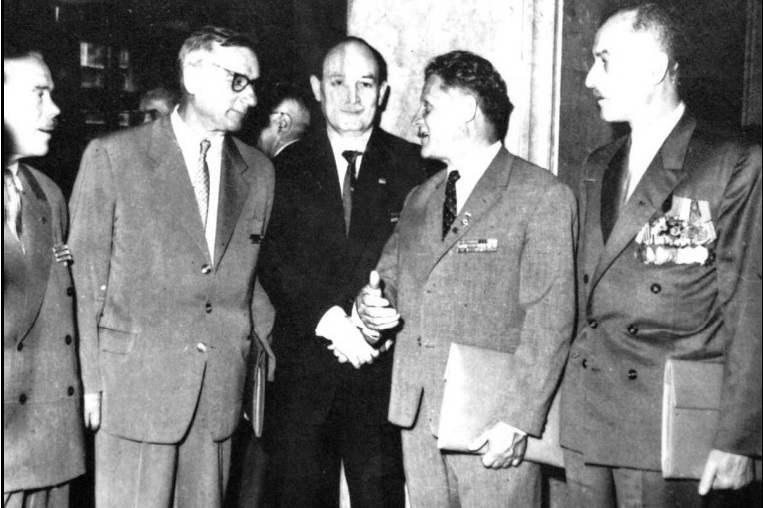
spanioli at party congress, 1965

IB combatants have not been much celebrated in propaganda, though the episode of Romanian volunteers was duly acknowledged, usually in anniversary press articles or when receiving honors and nominations. The veteran’s organisation AFVRdARS published a short-lived bulletin. The collective name "spanioli" was barely in circulation and until the end of the Gheorghiu-Dej era no related works have been published. In 1966 a monographic issue of a historiographic periodical went out, 1971 saw appearance of a book with articles and documents and in 1972 Roman was permitted to print his memoirs. Some fallen individuals (Călin, Roşu, Făclie) got streets named after them. Almost all interbrigadistas received generous pensions, though few remained beyond the privildged circle.

After 1989 the issue of "spanioli" barely generated public interest. If lambasted in the media, it is because of their role after 1944 rather than because of their Spanish engagements, which even in virulenty hostile press articles are referred to as "fighting Fascism". Streets have not been re-named. In 2008 the memoirs of Iancu went to print, and the 2011 scientific work on Romania and the Spanish Civil War by Paşcalău contained a chapter on the interbrigadistas. In 2013 Mihai Burcea, at the time a PhD researcher, started publishing first articles. His monographic 2017 dissertation was commercially released as a 700-page book in 2024; it is formatted as an academic study and mostly refrains from advancing a partisan perpective. Few other scientific articles have been published.

=== Yugoslavia ===
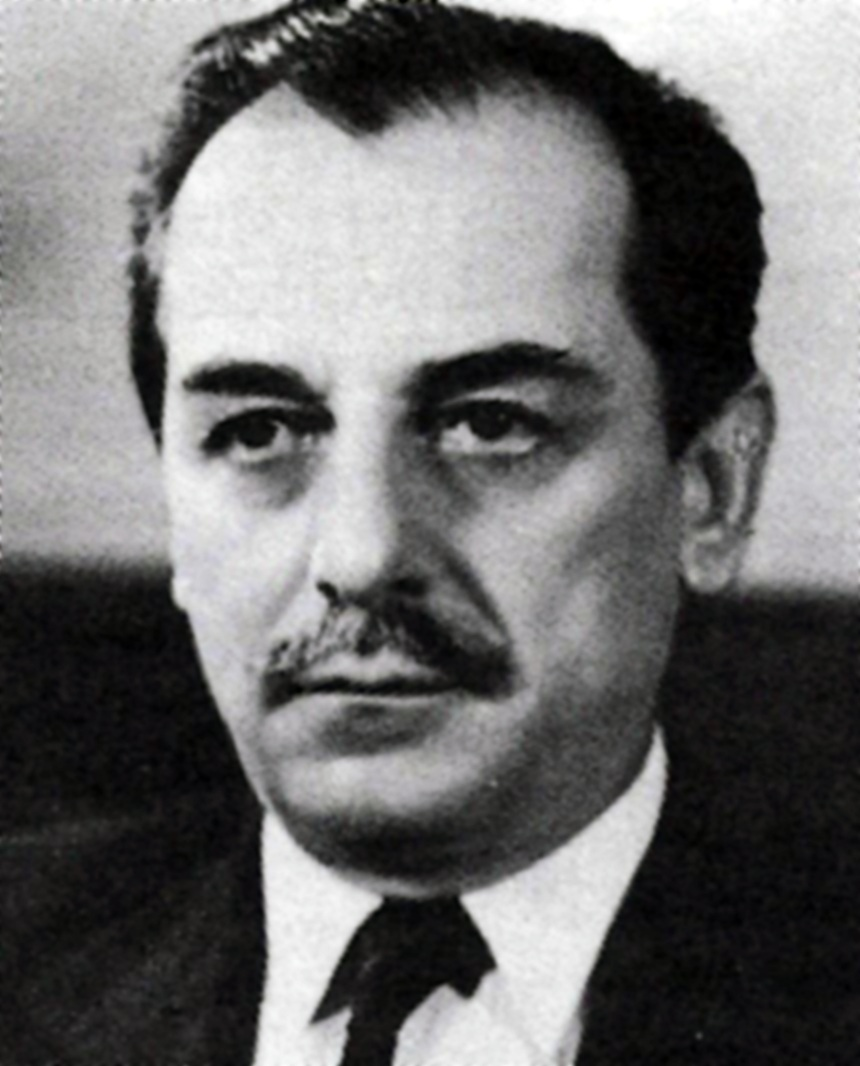
Koča Popović, highest-ranking IB combatant

Though the law passed in 1937 stripped volunteers of citizenship, some 350 ex-combatants made it to Yugoslavia; most engaged in Communist-led resistance. Unlike in anti-Nazi movements of other East European countries, Yugoslav interbrigadiers played a major role, e.g. in Croatian general staff of the National Liberation Army 3 key positions were held by ex-combatants: commander (Ivan Rukavina), political commissar (Marko Orešković) and operations officer (Franjo Ogulinac). Tito specifically issued orders for so-called Španci to assume command or otherwise important roles. Three individuals (Peko Dapčević, Kosta Nađ and Petar Drapšin) were commanding army-size groupings. Around 30 were later promoted to the rank of a general, 59 became People's Heroes, and 130 were killed.

In the post-war Yugoslavia IB combatants were overrepresented in power structures; Ivan Krajačić and Maks Baće were instrumental in setting up OZNA, while Koča Popović and Dapčević were chiefs of general staff. Like elsewhere in the communist bloc, some fell victim to the Tito-Stalin split, but here it was the Stalinists who were repressed; some 35 got imprisoned, though no-one was executed. Later a few (less than in East Germany, but more than in Poland) entered executive of the state party, and 20 entered the Central Committee. Popović briefly served as vice-president of Yugoslavia (1966–67) and a handful were ministers (Popović at foreign affairs, Ivan Gošnjak at defence, Rodoljub Čolaković in education). The dictator himself was related to the IB, as in 1936–37 Tito was heavily involved in organising recruitment to the Brigades.

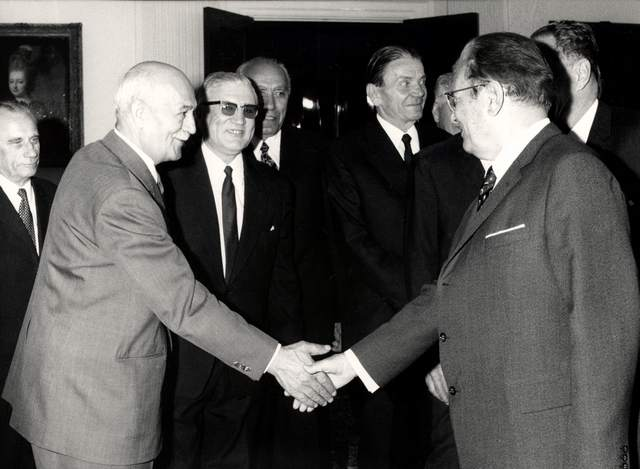
Tito with Španci, 1972

There were at least 400 members in the Yugoslav IB ex-combatant organization. It remained a highly prestigious group and in 1972 the parliament granted them extra rights. Some scholars claim that the organisation enjoyed limited political power. Španci remained celebrated, though usually combined with their role in resistance. First numerous biographies have been published and then broader massive works followed. No Spain-dedicated film has been made, but a Španac, battle-hardened combatant in partisan units, was frequent in movies about the resistance. Apart from monuments to partisan commanders with earlier IB record, a monument dedicated specifically to IB combatants was unveiled in 1976 in Rijeka. Numerous schools, streets and institutions were named after naši Španci. Despite some controversy in 1984, in 1986 massive commemorative events were organized across the country. Few brigadiers became political dissidents, though most remained faithful to the party line.

In all successor states the same pattern is at work as to heritage of IB volunteers. The memory debate has largely bypassed them due to the predominance of the Second World War on the mnemonic battlefield. However, for the Left they remain anti-fascist freedom fighters, while the Right relates brigadiers to post-war crimes such as the Bleiburg massacre. The Rijeka monument has been dismantled; monuments to other IB combatants (and resistance figures) suffered different fate, some removed, some re-located to less prestigious spots, and some renovated, yet the purges are interpreted as "part of the general nationalization of public space in the successor states" rather than a specific anti-IB or de-communisation project. Author of recent mononograph refers to "forgotten history of Yugoslav volunteers"; his perspective is that memory of the combatants is equal to cultivating "antifascist values necessary to foster an open and tolerant society in the twenty-first century".

=== Switzerland ===
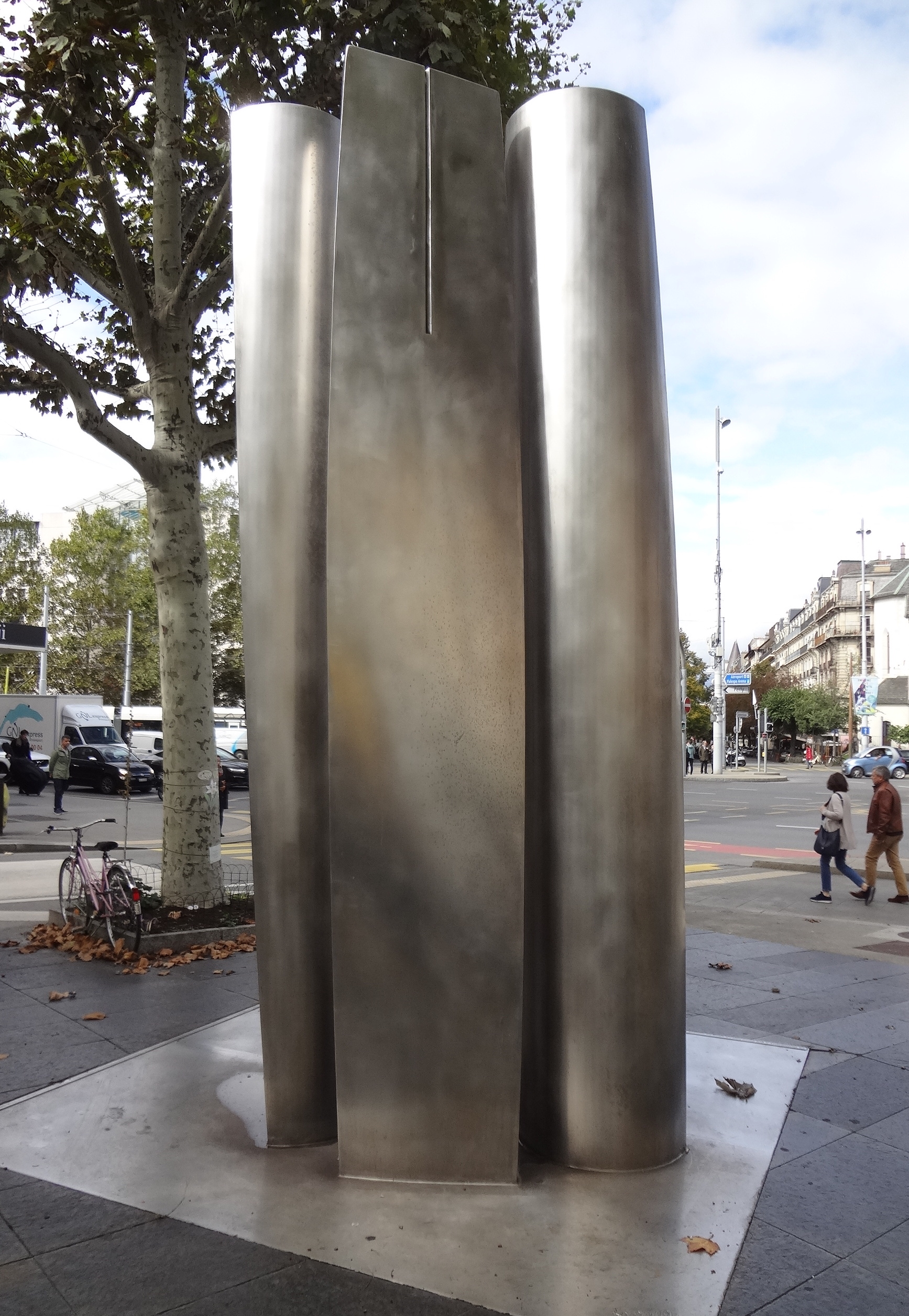
Monument to Swiss IB volunteers, Geneva.

In Switzerland, public sympathy was high for the Republican cause, but the federal government banned all fundraising and recruiting activities a month after the start of the war as part of the country's long-standing policy of neutrality. Around 800 Swiss volunteers joined the International Brigades, among them a small number of women. Sixty percent of Swiss volunteers identified as communists, while the others included socialists, anarchists and antifascists.

Some 170 Swiss volunteers were killed in the war. The survivors were tried by military courts upon their return to Switzerland for violating the criminal prohibition on foreign military service. The courts pronounced 420 sentences which ranged from around 2 weeks to 4 years in prison, and often also stripped the convicts of their political rights for the period of up to 5 years. In the Swiss society, traditionally highly appreciative of civic virtues, this translated to longtime stigmatization also after the penalty period expired. In the judgment of Swiss historian Mauro Cerutti, volunteers were punished more harshly in Switzerland than in any other democratic country.

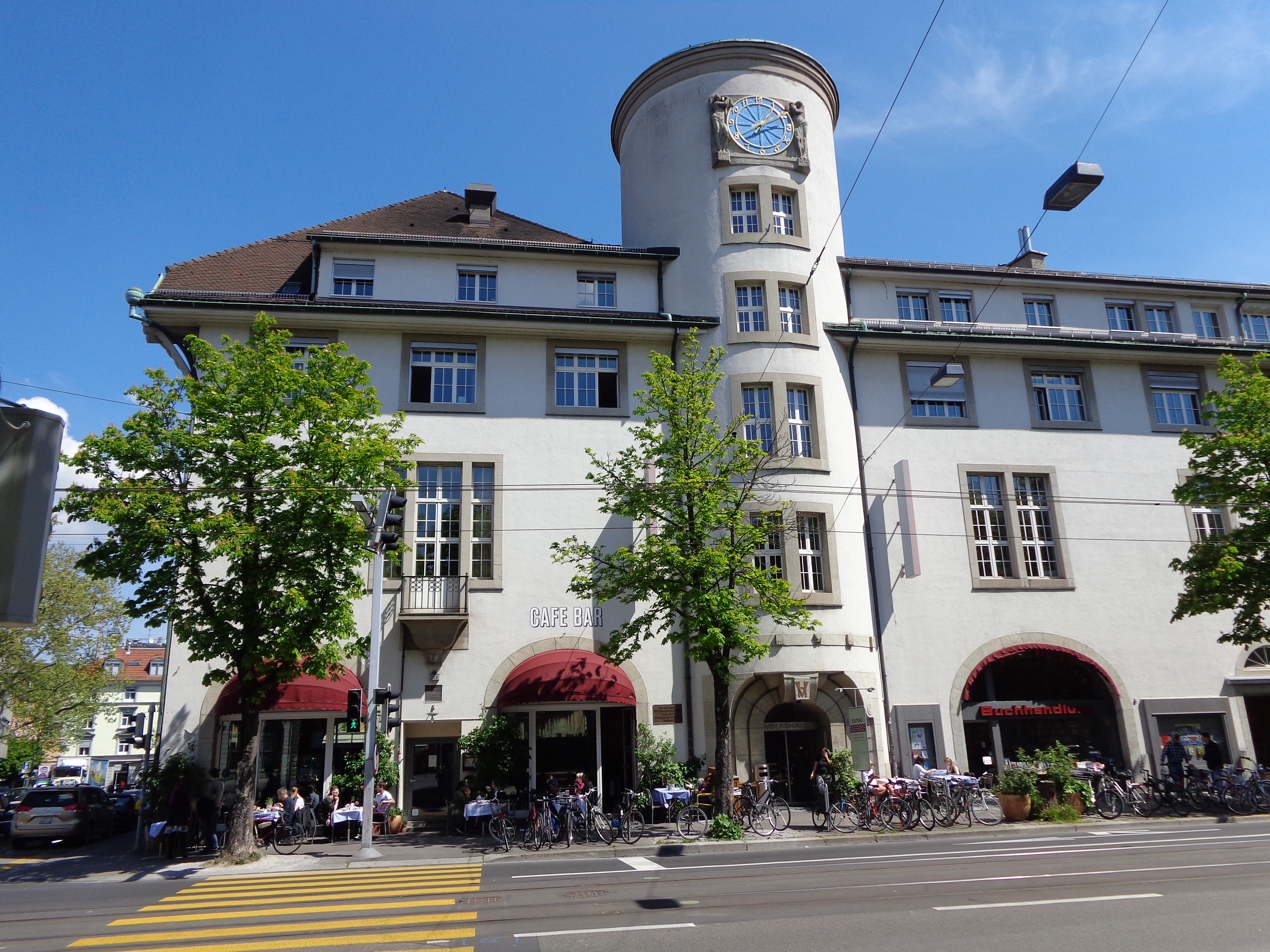
Zürich Volkshaus; plaque is visible left to main entrance

Motions to pardon the Swiss brigaders on the account that they fought for a just cause have been repeatedly introduced in the Swiss federal parliament. A first such proposal was defeated in 1939 on neutrality grounds. In 2002, Parliament again rejected a pardon of the Swiss war volunteers, with a majority arguing that they broke a law that remains in effect to this day. In March 2009, Parliament adopted the third bill of pardon, retroactively rehabilitating Swiss brigades, only a handful of whom were still alive.

In 2000, there was a monument honoring Swiss IB combatants unveiled in Geneva; there are also numerous plaques mounted elsewhere, e.g., at the Volkshaus in Zürich. Since 2003 there is "Place des Brigades-internationales" in La Chaux-de-Fonds. No Swiss IB ex-combatants became widely known personalities, though in the late 20th century some acquired certain public recognition; these were the cases of Ernst Stauffer (local civil servant and author of memoirs) and Hans Hutter (author and activist for rehabilitation). IG Spanienfreiwillige, an organisation set up to cultivate the memory of Swiss volunteers, built up a database of around 800 individuals, more than a half of them listed with some biographical details.

=== United Kingdom ===
On disbandment, 305 British volunteers left Spain to return home. They arrived at Victoria Station in central London on 7 December and were met warmly as returning heroes by a crowd of supporters including Clement Attlee, Stafford Cripps, Willie Gallacher, Ellen Wilkinson and Will Lawther.

The last surviving British member of the International Brigades, Geoffrey Servante, died in April 2019 aged 99.

==== IBMT ====
The International Brigade Memorial Trust is a registered charity that handles activities around the memory of volunteers from Britain and Ireland. The group maintains a map of memorials to volunteers in the Spanish Civil War and organises yearly events to commemorate the war.

=== United States ===
In the United States, the returned volunteers were labeled "premature anti-fascists" by the FBI, denied promotion during service in the U.S. military during World War II, and pursued by Congressional committees during the Red Scare of 1947–1957. However, threats of loss of citizenship were not carried out.

== Recognition ==
Josep Almudéver, believed to be the last surviving veteran of the International Brigades, died on 23 May 2021 at the age of 101. Although born into a Spanish family and living in Spain at the outbreak of the conflict, he also held French citizenship and enlisted in the International Brigades to avoid age restrictions in the Spanish Republican army. He served in the CXXIX International Brigade and later fought in the Spanish Maquis, and after the war lived in exile in France.

=== Spain ===
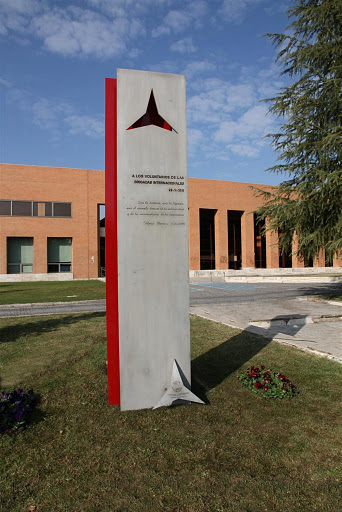
Memorial to the International Brigades in the university campus where the Battle of Ciudad Universitaria took place.

On 26 January 1996, the Spanish government gave Spanish citizenship to the 600 or so remaining Brigadistas, fulfilling a promise made by Prime Minister Juan Negrín in 1938.

=== France ===
In 1996, Jacques Chirac, then French President, granted the former French members of the International Brigades the legal status of former service personnel ("ancient combatants") following the request of two French communist Members of Parliament, Lefort and Asensi, both children of volunteers. Before 1996, the same request was turned down several times including by François Mitterrand, the former Socialist President.

== Symbolism and heraldry ==
The International Brigades were inheritors of a socialist aesthetic. The flags featured the colors of the Spanish Republic: red, yellow and purple, often along with socialist symbols (red flags, hammer and sickle, fist). The emblem of the brigades themselves was the three-pointed red star, which is often featured.

== See also ==
- Anti-Fascist Internationalist Front
- Foreign involvement in the Spanish Civil War
- International Legion of Territorial Defense of Ukraine
- Simón Bolívar Internationalist Brigades
- International Freedom Battalion
- Interbrigades
