= Louise Michel battalions =

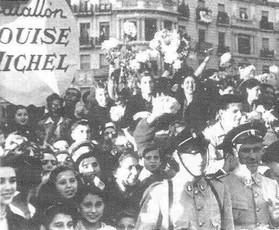
On October 28, 1938, a crowd bid farewell to the brigadists under the sign of the Louise Michel Battalion.

Two unconnected battalions of French-speaking volunteers from France and Belgium in the International Brigades were referred to as the Louise Michel Battalion (French: Bataillon Louise Michel) during the Spanish Civil War. Both were named after Louise Michel, a militant involved in the Paris Commune of 1871 known as the "Red virgin of Montmartre". Both battalions mustered in November and December 1936.

- The first battalion was an existing group of volunteers (see Centuria) who had been operating in Barcelona. This was absorbed into battalions being formed for the XI International Brigade.
- The second was raised at Albacete from French-speaking volunteers. Towards the end of January 1938, it was merged into the Henri Vuilleman Battalion of the XIV International Brigade.
