= Henri Vuilleman Battalion =

- Active: 1936–1938
- Country: French
- Allegiance: Republican Spain
- Branch: International Brigades
- Type: Infantry battalion
- Part of: XIII International Brigade; XIV International Brigade

The Henri Vuilleman Battalion was a unit of the International Brigades during the Spanish Civil War. It was raised on 12 December 1936, mostly from French and Belgian volunteers, absorbing surviving members of the Louise Michel (I) Battalion. It was first mustered as a battalion of XIII International Brigade. On 5 August 1937, it transferred to the XIV International Brigade. It was dissolved on 23 April 1938 with the remaining troops being redistributed in the XIV International Brigade.

== Sources ==
The information in this stub has been extracted from:

- (in Spanish) EPR Order of Battle XIIIth Brigade
- (in Spanish) EPR Order of Battle XIVth Brigade
- (in Catalan) Associació Catalana Website
