= Memorial to the International Brigades =

Military monument in Madrid

Coordinates: 40°26′36″N 3°43′40″W

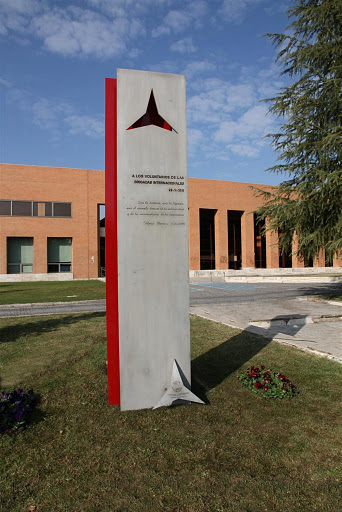

The memorial to the International Brigades is a monument located in the campus of the Universidad Complutense de Madrid, dedicated to the members of the International Brigades who fought in the Spanish Civil War.

Erected on 22 October 2011, the monument has been vandalised, and in 2013 the Supreme Court in Madrid upheld a complaint that the monument was a violation of local planning regulations and should be removed. The university replied by insisting that the local government had not acknowledged the application that they had made. The case was dismissed in 2017.

The monument is placed in the location of the Battle of Ciudad Universitaria.
