= Dimitrov Battalion =

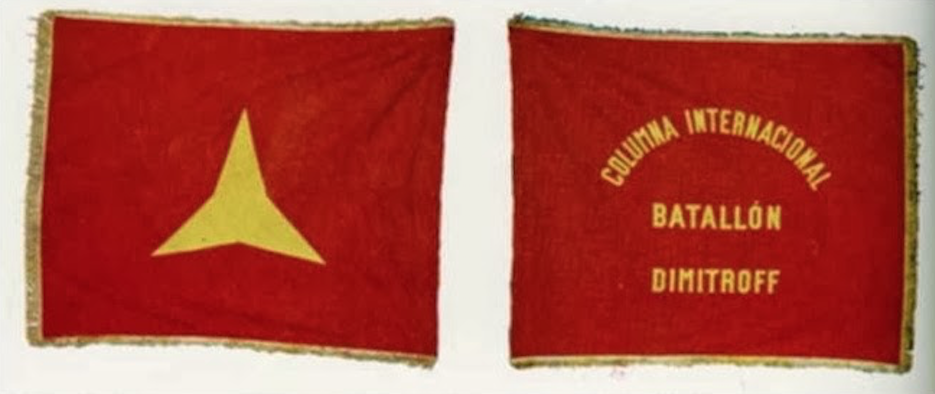
- Two sided flag of the Dimitrov Battalion
- Active: December 1936 – 5 October 1938
- Country: Bulgaria, Greece and Yugoslavia
- Allegiance: Spain
- Branch: International Brigades
- Type: Infantry
- Size: 800
- Part of: XV International Brigade (1937); 45th International Division (1937-1938); CXXIX International Brigade (1938)
- Patron: Georgi Dimitrov
- Engagements: Spanish Civil War: Battle of Jarama

Commanders
- Notable commanders: Ivan Paunov †; Franc Rozman; Josef Pavel

The Dimitrov Battalion was part of the International Brigades during the Spanish Civil War. It was the 18th battalion formed, and was named after Georgi Dimitrov, a Bulgarian communist and General Secretary of the Comintern in that period.

== History ==
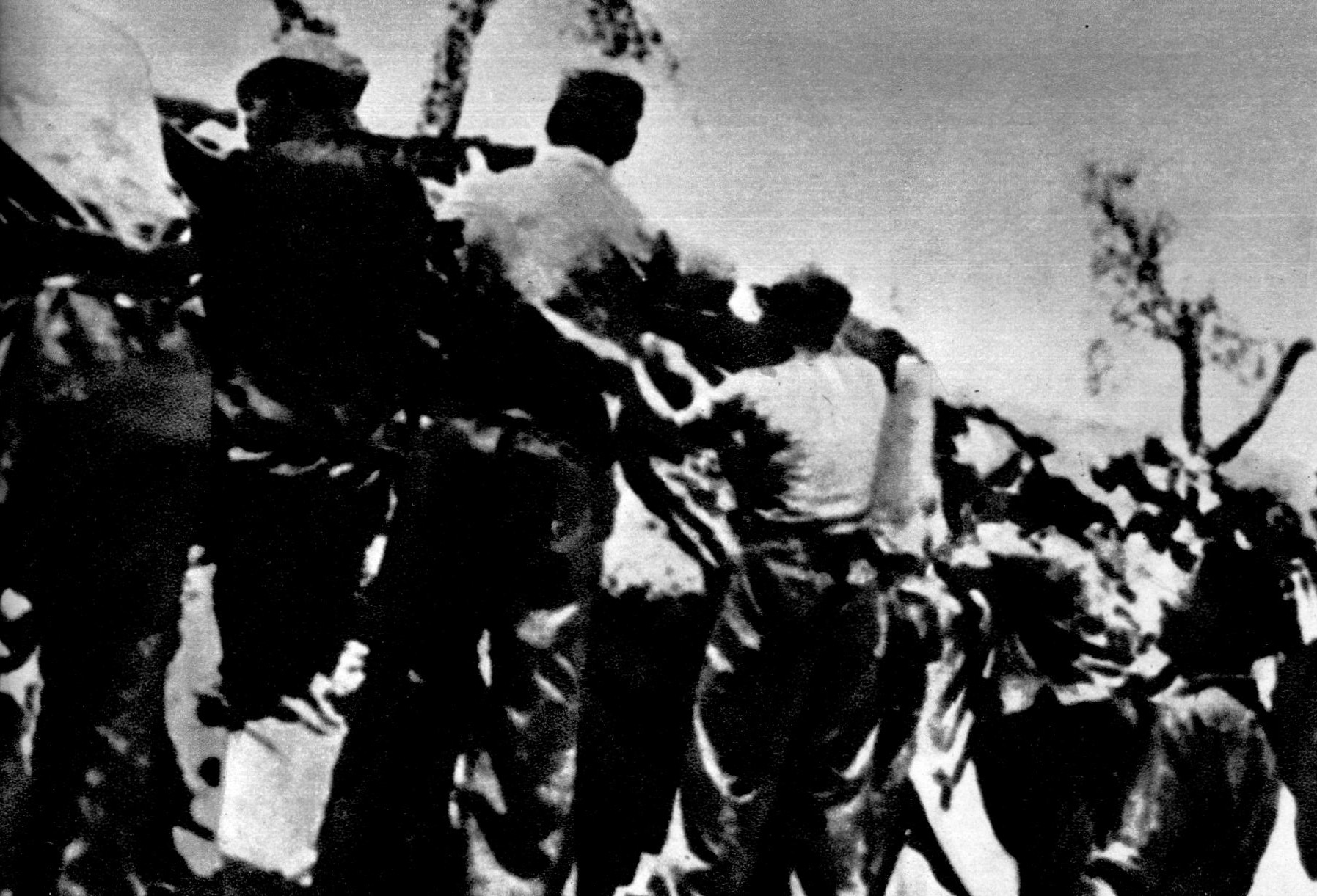
Volunteers of the Battalion in action, 1937

It was founded in December 1936, composed largely of Balkan exiles. It soon had 800 volunteers, including about 400 Bulgarians, 160 Greeks and 25 Yugoslavs. The first commander of the battalion was the Bulgarian Ivan Paunov (pseudonym Grebenarov) who perished under frontal attack on 12 February 1937. The Battalion then became part of the XV International Brigade on 31 January 1937. There it joined two battalions that were to become famous: the British Battalion and the Lincoln Battalion. They fought together for the first time at the Battle of Jarama in February 1937, with the Dimitrovs holding the right. The brigade suffered extremely heavy casualties.

On 20 September 1937 the Dimitrovs were moved to 45th International Division Reserve, where the battalion was rebuilt. On 13 February 1938 it became part of the newly formed 129th International Brigade, which was formed from central European battalions. It remained with the 129th Brigade until it was demobilised on 5 October 1938. Its last commander, Josef Pavel, became a cabinet minister during Alexander Dubček's Prague Spring in 1968.

== Notable members ==
- Todor Angelov (1900–1943), Bulgarian anarcho-communist and later member of the Belgian Resistance.
- Peko Dapčević (1913–1999), Yugoslav communist and partisan who later became Chief of the General Staff of Yugoslavia

== See also ==
- Yugoslav volunteers in the Spanish Civil War
- List of military units named after people

== Sources ==
- Hugh Thomas, The Spanish Civil War, 4th Rev. Ed. 2001.
- Antony Beevor, The Battle for Spain, 2006.
- (in Spanish) Order of Battle website Broken link
- (in Spanish) Associació Catalana de Vexil·lologia Website
- (in Serbian) Đurđević-Đukić Olga, Narodni heroji Jugoslavije, Belgrade 1975. (COBISS.SR-ID:5575431)
