= Wacław Komar =

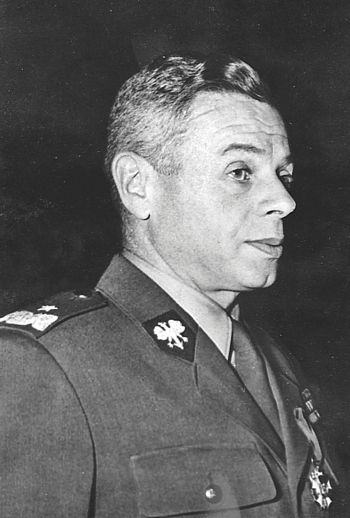
- Born: Mendel Kossoj; 4 May 1909; Warsaw, Congress Poland
- Died: 26 January 1972 (aged 62); Warsaw, Polish People's Republic
- Burial place: Powązki Military Cemetery, Warsaw
- Military career
- Allegiance: Polish People's Republic
- Branch: International Brigades; Polish Army in France; Polish People's Army; Ministry of Public Security
- Service years: 1936-1968
- Rank: Generał brygady (Brigadier general)
- Nicknames: Kucyk, Morski, Herbut, Nestor, Cygan
- Units: XIII International Brigade; Department II of the General Staff
- Commands: Main Quartermaster of the Polish Army; Internal Security Corps
- Conflicts: Spanish Civil War; Second World War
- Awards

Wacław Komar (4 May 1909 – 26 January 1972) was a Polish brigadier general, head of intelligence of the Ministry of Public Security and commander of the Internal Security Corps.

== Biography ==
He was born in Warsaw as Mendel Kossoj in a Jewish family of David and Feiga. In 1924 he became a member of Hashomer Hatzair. In 1925 he joined the Young Communist League of Poland, and from 1926 he also belonged to the Communist Party of Poland. In June 1927 he came to the USSR. He trained in sabotage courses of the Red Army and then was sent to serve in the NKVD. During this time he joined the Communist Party of the Soviet Union. In 1930–1931 he worked in the Moscow Committee of the Communist Youth International, where he was secretary of the Anti-War Commission. Then he left to Germany, where he stayed until 1932. In 1933 he came to Second Polish Republic, where in 1934–1936 he worked in the National Secretariat of the Communist Party of Western Ukraine.

In 1936 he arrived in Spain, where he took part in the Spanish Civil War, fighting in International Brigades. He was a battalion commander in the Jarosław Dąbrowski Brigade. Later he was appointed head of the brigade's intelligence. He fought at Guadalajara, Zaragoza and in the Siege of Madrid. He was wounded three times. He also joined the Communist Party of Spain. After the end of the civil war he left to France. In the autumn of 1939 he joined the Polish Army in France, with whom he fought in the Battle of France. During the campaign he was taken prisoner by the Germans. He was held in captivity until April 1945. He then remained in France, where in June 1945 he took up the position of deputy head of the Polish Military Mission.

In December 1945 he returned to Poland. He took the position of head of the Second Department of the Polish General Staff, responsible for military intelligence. From 17 July 1947 he additionally held the position of director of Department in the Ministry of Public Security. In 1946 he was promoted to the rank of brigadier general. After the 2nd plenum of the Central Committee of the Polish United Workers' Party, during which Władysław Gomułka and Marian Spychalski were removed from the Central Committee, Wacław Komar was dismissed from his positions. A purge was carried out in the intelligence, removing employees close to Komar, mainly Jews and veterans of the civil war in Spain. On 6 July 1951 he became the Chief Quartermaster of the Polish People's Army.

On November 11, 1952, he was arrested and tortured during the investigation in order to force a confession against Gomułka and Spychalski. The investigation against him was discontinued on December 17, 1954. He was released from custody 6 days later. In the years 1955-1956, he was the director of the "Spefika" Factory and the Warsaw Photochemical Plant "Foton". On August 24, 1956, he was reinstated in the army and appointed acting commander of the Internal Security Corps (Commander of the Corps, Brigadier General Włodzimierz Muś, was in the USSR attending military studies). During the events of the Polish October, as commander of the Internal Security Corps, he took action to oppose the units of the Soviet Army and the Polish People's Army moving towards Warsaw.

On June 10, 1960, he became director in the Ministry of Internal Affairs. He was dismissed from this position on February 15, 1968, as part of the anti-Semitic purges that took place after Israel's victory in the Six days war. Suspected by the PZPR authorities of participating in the March Events, he was put under surveillance.

He died on January 26, 1972 and was buried in the Powązki Military Cemetery in Warsaw.

== Awards and decorations ==
- Order of the Banner of Labour, 1st Class
- Commander's Cross with Star of the Order of Polonia Restituta
- Order of the Cross of Grunwald, 3rd Class
- Commander's Cross of the Order of Polonia Restituta
- Gold Cross of Virtuti Militari (16 July 1946)
- Gold Cross of Merit
- Medal "For Your Freedom and Ours"
- Medal of Victory and Freedom 1945
- Silver Medal of the Armed Forces in the Service of the Fatherland
- Badge of the 1000th Anniversary of the Polish State
- Gold Janek Krasicki Decoration (1966)
- Commander of the Order of the White Lion (Czechoslovakia)
- Order of the Slovak National Uprising, 1st Class (Czechoslovakia)
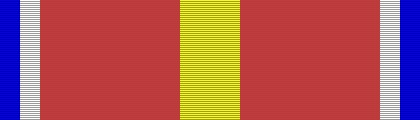
- Dukla Commemorative Medal (Czechoslovakia)
- Hans Beimler Medal (East Germany)

== Bibliography ==
- Królikowski J., "Generals and admirals of the Polish Army 1943−1990", vol. II, Toruń: Wydawnictwo Adam Marszałek, 2010, ISBN 978-83-7611-801-7.
- Nowak J.R., "Red Dynasties: Komars' Clan", vol. II, Warsaw: Wydawnictwo MaRoN, 2007, ISBN 978-83-8903-306-2.
