= La Iglesuela del Cid =

- municipality
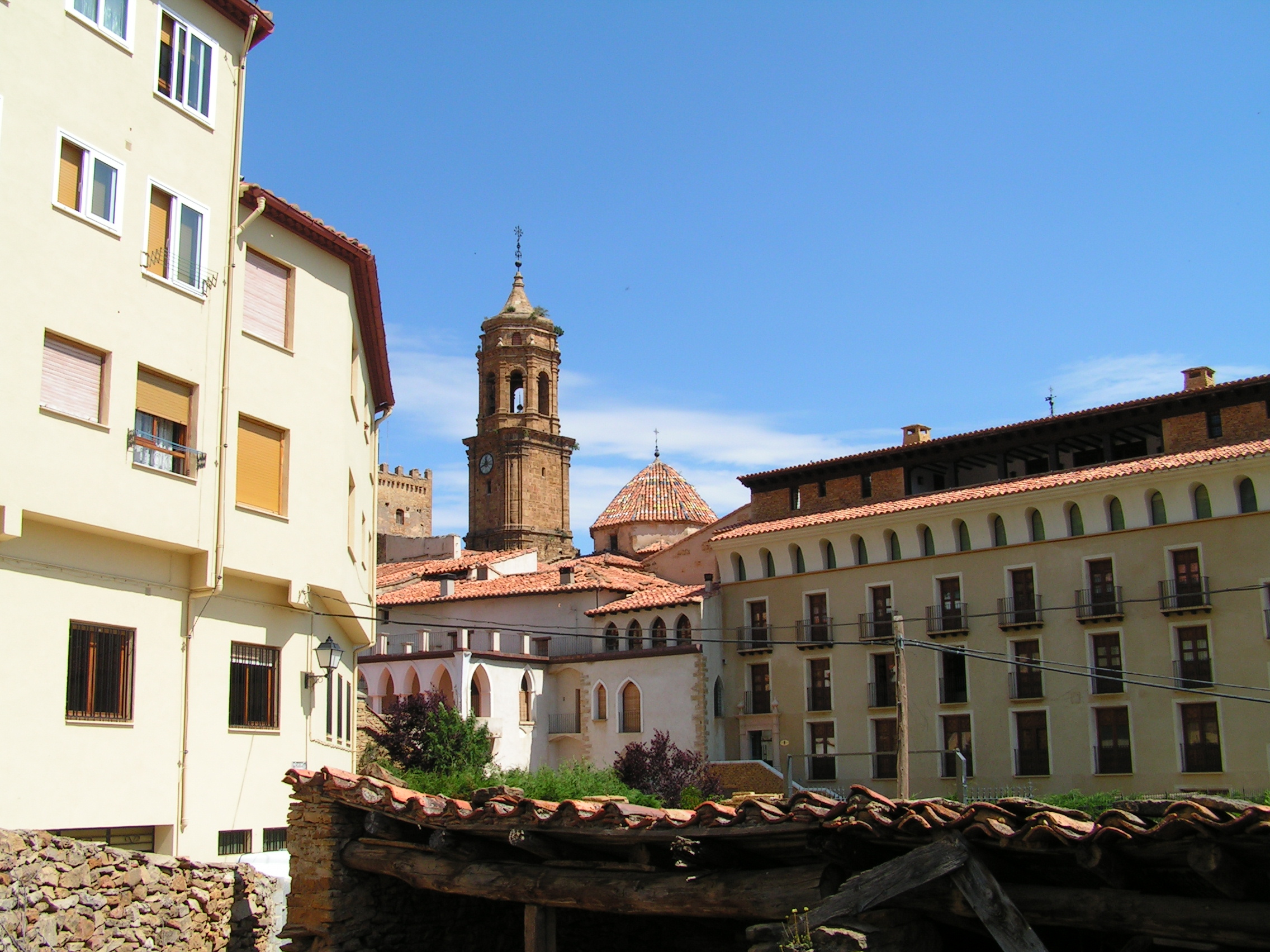

- Location within Spain
- Coordinates: 40°29′N 0°19′W
- Country: Spain
- Autonomous community: Aragon
- Province: Teruel
- Municipality: La Iglesuela del Cid

Area
  - Total: 40 km^{2} (15 sq mi)
- Elevation: 1,227 m (4,026 ft)

Population (2025-01-01)
  - Total: 357
  - Density: 8.9/km^{2} (23/sq mi)
- Time zone: UTC+1 (CET)
  - Summer (DST): UTC+2 (CEST)

La Iglesuela del Cid is a municipality located in the province of Teruel, Aragon, Spain. According to the 2004 census (INE), the municipality has a population of 501 inhabitants.

== See also ==
- List of municipalities in Teruel
