= Maks Baće =

Maksimilijan "Maks" Baće, nom de guerre Milić (12 December 1914 in Pakoštane – 4 December 2005 in Split), was a Yugoslav and Croatian revolutionary.

== Biography ==
Born in Pakoštane (near Zadar) and raised in Split, he studied philosophy in Zagreb, became a student organizer and a member of the Communist Party of Yugoslavia in 1934. While a student, for his anti-state activities, he was convicted and imprisoned for six months in Belgrade. After graduating in 1937 he left for Spain where he took part in the Spanish Civil War on the Republican side until its conclusion. He was wounded twice, and after the republican defeat interned in Southern France and Germany where he was forced to work in a Nazi airplane factory. He escaped and returned to Zagreb in the summer of 1941.

=== World War II ===
Experience gained in Spain proved valuable after the Axis invasion of Yugoslavia in 1941. His native Croatia was carved up between Italy and the Independent State of Croatia, with Italy fielding a strong occupation force in Dalmatia. Italian forces were supported by the pro-royal Chetniks in Serb-populated areas. The occupation led many Dalmatians to join the resistance organized by Tito's Partisans. The first detachments formed in Summer 1941 and manned by idealistic but inexperienced youths from coastal towns were poorly led and decimated by Italian units even before they began to operate in the Split hinterland in the vicinity of Sinj. This was a major blow to the resistance movement in Dalmatia. On his return to Zagreb Maks Baće was directed by the Party to travel to Split to discover the causes of that failure. He was then given the task of starting a new uprising which he organized in the region of the Biokovo mountain. He used the war pseudonym "Milić" in order to protect his family in Split and throughout the war people knew him only under that name.

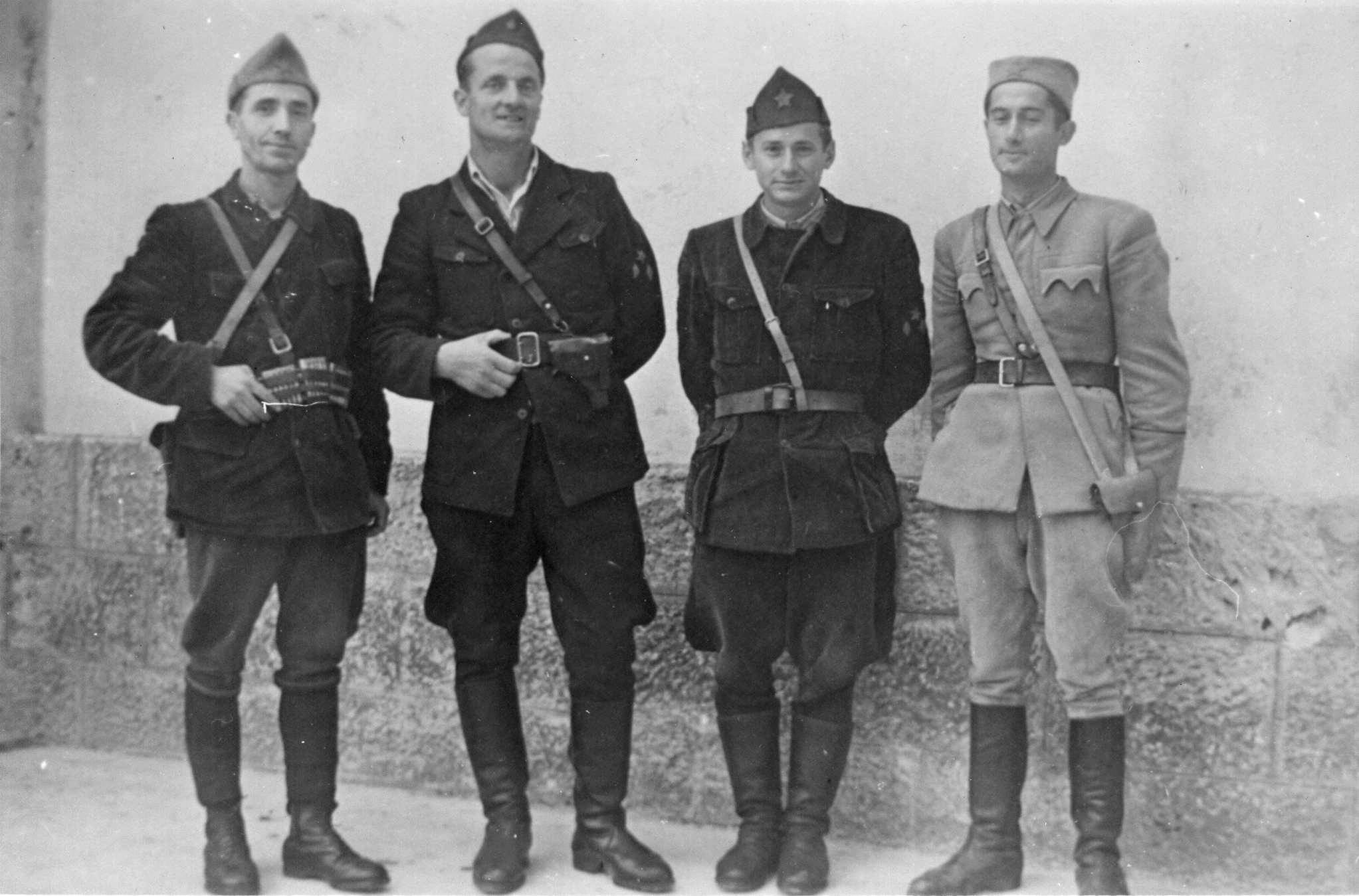
The staff of the 4th operational zone in September 1942. Milić is the first from the right.

Baće believed that the partisans should rely on the support of rural people in the hinterland, referred to by citifolk as "peasants," and his strategy began to bear fruit in early 1942 when the new partisan detachments proved to be more resilient and more effective in their battles with the Italian, Ustasha and Chetnik forces. "Milić" became a popular name among the peasants of the region and he created thousands of new soldiers as the volunteers joined the partisans in large numbers. During an operation in the vicinity of the Dalmatian village Tugare Maks Baće was shot through the chest and left by his comrades as dead. He survived thanks to the care of a local peasant family and then smuggled himself into Split where he reconvalesced. In 1943 he was appointed the commander-in-chief of Partisan Detachments in Dalmatia.

After the capitulation of Italy in September 1943 Maks Baće was the partisan officer who accepted the surrender of the Italian forces in Split, and the Partisans briefly took control of much of Dalmatia. However, they were soon expelled by the vastly stronger German forces which replaced the Italians. As one after the other of the Dalmatian islands fell to the Germans, partisan units withdrew to the most distant of them, the island of Vis. Maks Baće commanded the island and sent a controversial telegram to Josip Broz Tito requesting an order from him to defend the island. This he received, along with the reinforcement of another brigade of Partisan forces. A free Vis was later critical to Tito's own escape from German airdrop encirclement in Bosnia (called "Operation Knight's Leap") of his Drvar headquarters, as well as the locus of early negotiations between partisans and the Allies. Liberated Vis also served as moral support for the partisans in the many periods of almost hopeless struggle with the militarily superior Germans. In 1944 Baće was one of the founders of OZNA. For his war service, Maks Baće received the coveted medal of the People's Hero of Yugoslavia.

=== After the War ===
After the war Maks Baće was a minister in the government of Yugoslavia, its ambassador to Japan and Sweden and then a member of the National Assembly and its Secretary. He was a free thinker viewing party dogma critically and gradually became disillusioned with Communism and the ideological (as opposed to experience-based) political thinking of the regime. In 1971 during Croatian Spring he made the significant political statement of resigning from the Communist Party, and retired to Split, at which point he began to be viewed as a dissident. His absence from public life continued even after the arrival of democracy in the 1990s. When the Croatian media interviewed him at his 90th birthday, he revealed that he was working on a book critical of Karl Marx's thought. The book was finished and published in 2003 as: "Absurds of Karl Marx" (Croatian: Apsurdi Karla Marxa). He died of natural causes in his family home at age 91.
