= Cenicientos =

- Municipality
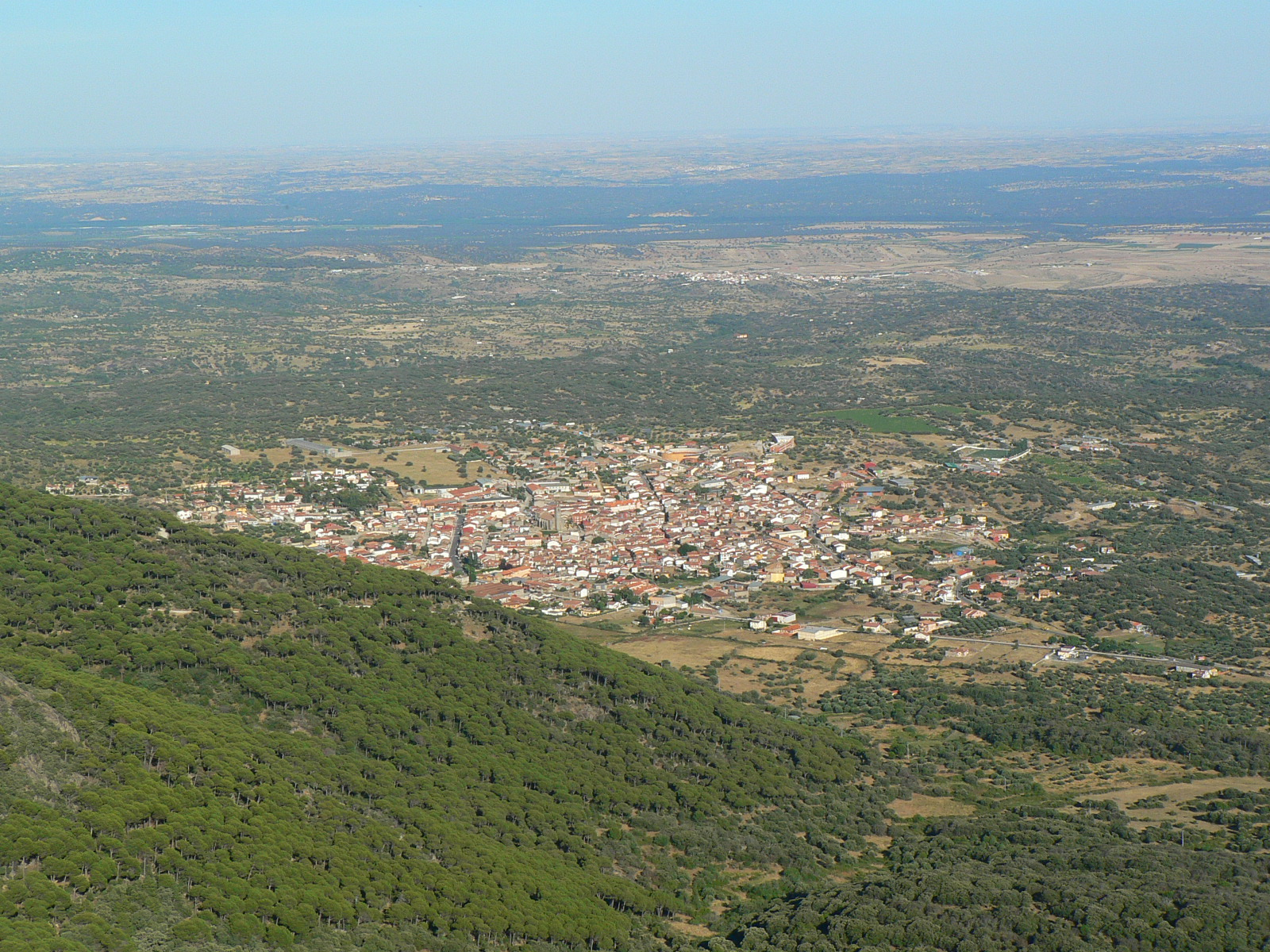

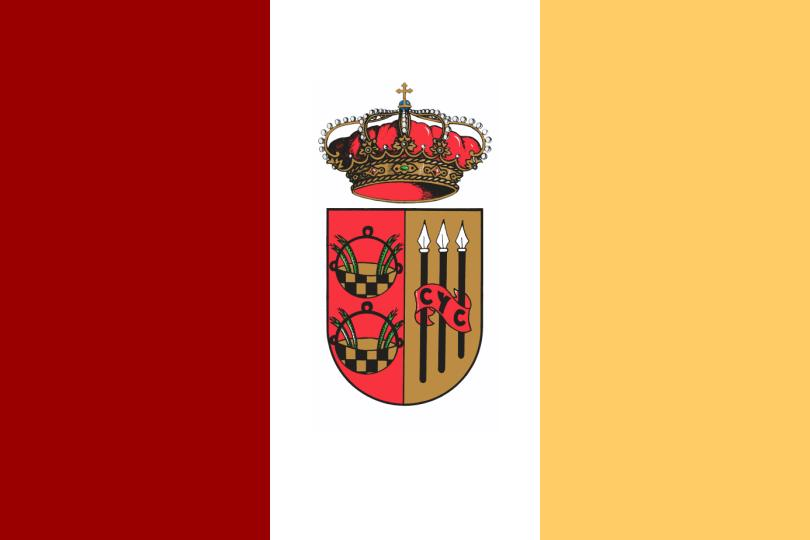
- Flag Coat of arms

- Location of Cenicientos in Madrid

- Location within Spain Location within Community of Madrid Location within Spain
- Coordinates: 40°15′50″N 4°28′00″W
- Country: Spain
- Region: Community of Madrid

Area
  - Total: 67.49 km^{2} (26.06 sq mi)

Population (2025-01-01)
  - Total: 2,152
  - Density: 31.89/km^{2} (82.58/sq mi)
- Time zone: UTC+1 (CET)
  - Summer (DST): UTC+2 (CEST)

Cenicientos (Spanish pronunciation: [θeniˈθjentos]) is a municipality in the Community of Madrid, Spain. It is located in the southwesternmost end of the region. The municipality covers an area of 67.49 km^{2}. As of 2018, it has a population of 1,980. The urban settlement is located on the spurs of the Sistema Central, next to the Peña de Cenicientos (1,252 m), a small mountain range separated from the main range of the Sierra de Gredos and with continuity in the Sierra de San Vicente.
