= Chapinería =

Coordinates: 40°23′N 4°12′W

- Municipality
- Coat of arms

- Municipal location within the Community of Madrid.
- Country: Spain
- Autonomous community: Community of Madrid

Area
  - Total: 9.8 sq mi (25.4 km^{2})

Population (2025-01-01)
  - Total: 2,705
- Time zone: UTC+1 (CET)
  - Summer (DST): UTC+2 (CEST)

Chapinería is a municipality of the autonomous community of Madrid in central Spain. It belongs to the comarca of Sierra Oeste de Madrid.

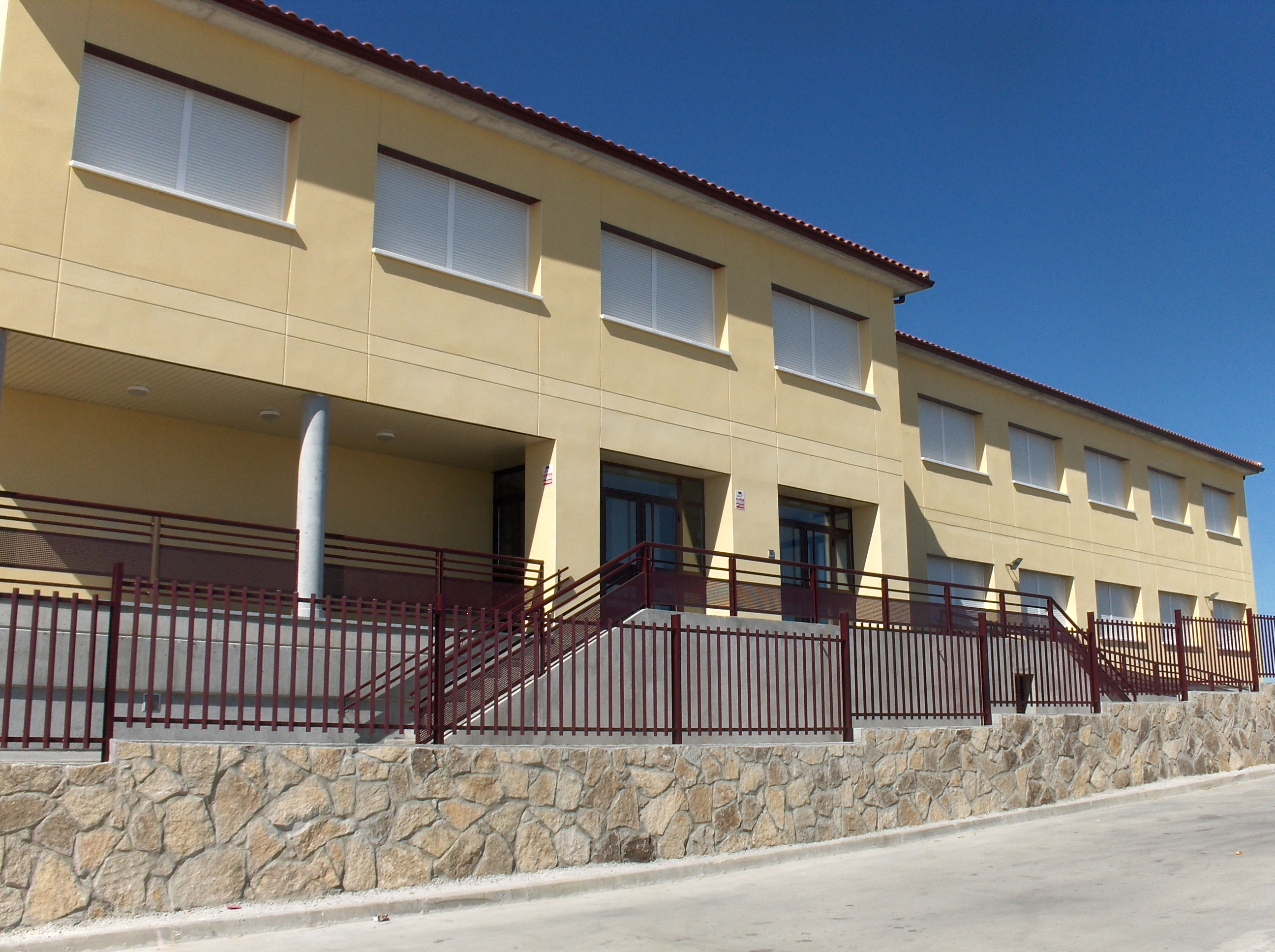
School in Chapinería
