= Josef Pavel =

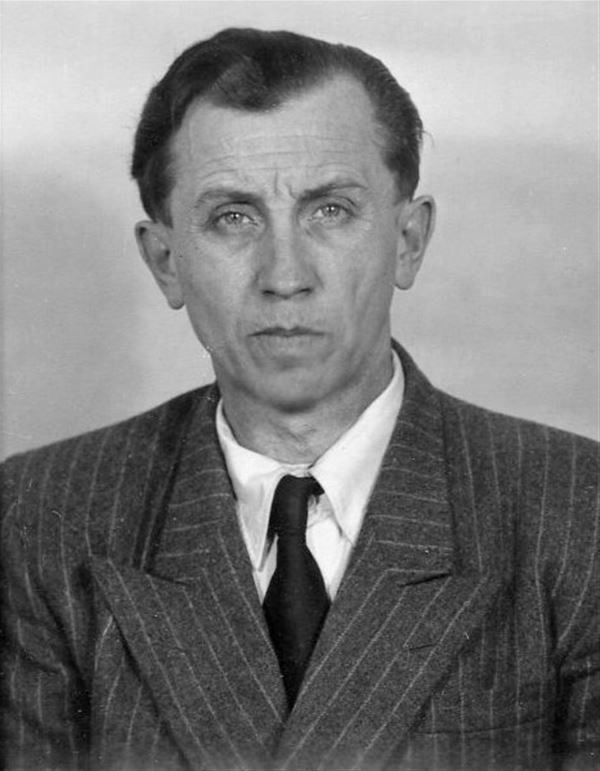
- 1951 mugshot of Pavel

Minister of the Interior of Czechoslovakia
- In office 8 April 1968 – 31 August 1968
- Preceded by: Josef Kudrna
- Succeeded by: Jan Pelnář

Personal details
- Born: 18 October 1908 Novosedly, Kingdom of Bohemia, Austria-Hungary
- Died: 9 April 1973 (aged 64) Benešov, Czechoslovakia
- Party: Communist Party of Czechoslovakia

Military service
- Allegiance: Spanish Republic; Czechoslovak government-in-exile Czechoslovak Socialist Republic
- Branch/service: International Brigades; British Army; Communist Party of Czechoslovakia
- Years of service: 1937–1939; 1942–1945; 1948
- Rank: Battalion Commander; Chief of Staff
- Unit: The "Abraham Lincoln" XV International Brigade; 1st Czechoslovak Independent Armoured Brigade; People's Militia
- Commands: Dimitrov Battalion; People's Militia
- Battles/wars: Spanish Civil War; Fall of Barcelona; World War II; Western Front; 1948 Czechoslovak coup d'état

Josef Pavel (18 September 1908 – 9 April 1973) was a Czechoslovak communist politician and military official who served as Minister of Interior of Czechoslovakia during the Prague Spring.

== Biography ==
=== Early career ===
He was born in to the poor family of a farmer. From a young age, he was involved in left-wing groups and was a member of the Federation of Proletarian Physical Education. He became a member of the Communist Party in 1932 and soon became part of its Prague regional leadership. In 1935, the party sent him to the International Lenin School in Moscow.

During the Spanish Civil War he left for Spain as a volunteer and military instructor and commander in the Dimitrov Battalion of the International Brigades. After the defeat of the Republican forces he fled to France where he was arrested until 1942. After his release Pavel joined the Czechoslovak government in exile and fought in the 1st Czechoslovak Armoured Brigade on the Western Front.

=== Post-war career ===
In liberated Czechoslovakia, he served on the Regional Committees of the Communist Party in Ústí nad Labem and Plzeň, and since 1947 he has been the Chief Secretary of the Defense and Security Department of the Central Committee of the Communist Party. In this capacity, in February he worked to strengthen the party's positions in the National Security Corps and the management of SNB units.

He took part in the communist coup in February 1948 as Chief of Staff of the General Staff of the People's Militia. In the elections in May 1948, he was elected a member of the National Assembly and became the first vice-chairman of its Defense and Security Committee. From January 1949 he was Deputy Interior Minister Václav Nosek and received the rank of General of the SNB. He was a member of the Security Committee of the Central Committee of the Communist Party. In these positions he took part in the repression against the opponents of the communist regime. In IX. Congress of the Communist Party in May 1949 was elected a member of the Central Committee.

In 1950, he was removed from the position of Deputy Minister and replaced by Karel Šváb. He was given command in forming the Border Guard. From 1 January 1951, he worked at the school of the Ministry of the Interior in Slapy. He was arrested here on 2 February 1951.

=== Imprisonment ===
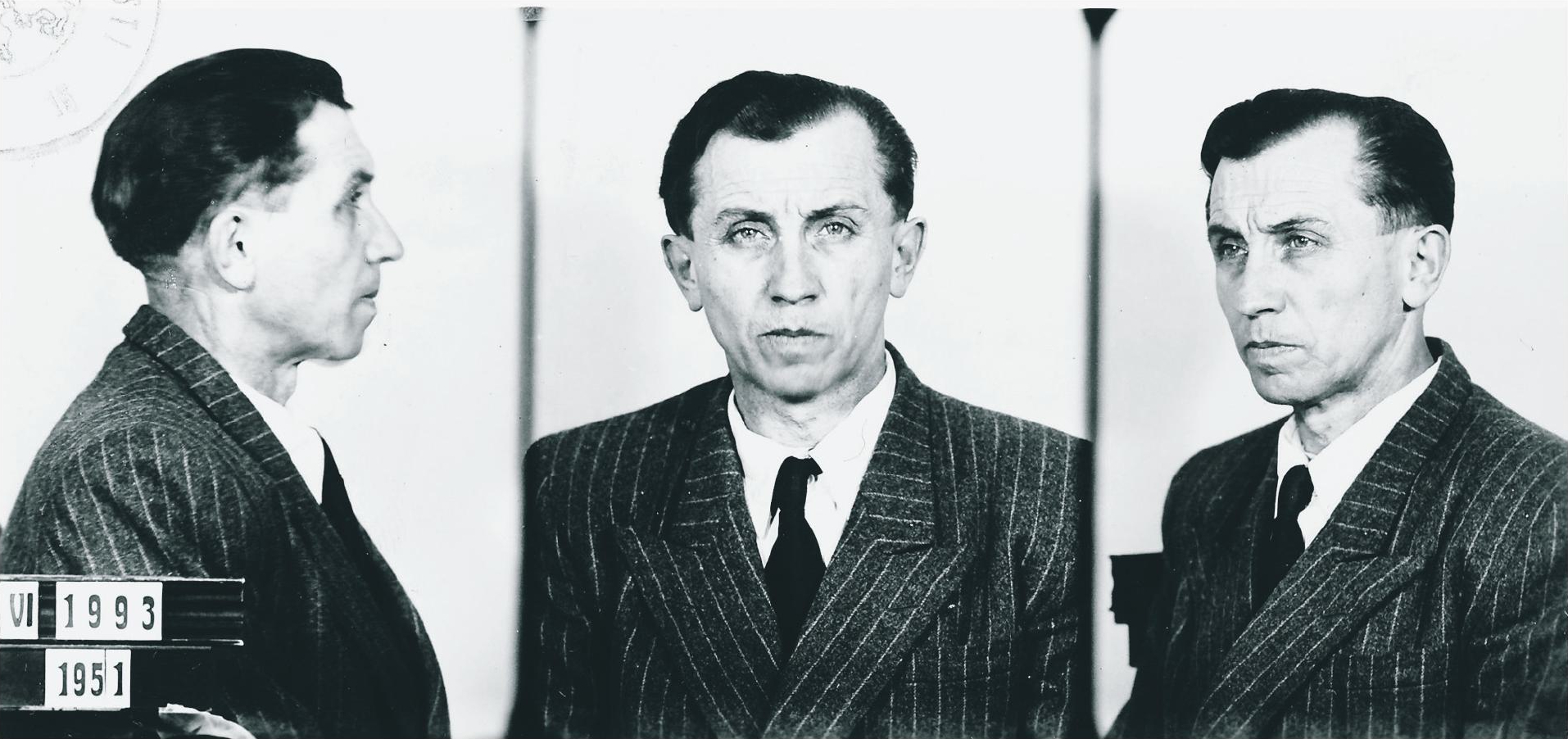
Pavel after his arrest, 1951

In custody State Security investigators tried to force him to confess to membership in a Trotskyist conspiracy group. The aim of the conspiracy was to assassinate the General Secretary of the Central Committee of the Communist Party, Rudolf Slánský and other party representatives, a coup d'état and the return of Czechoslovakia to capitalism. On the contrary, after Slánský's arrest, he was forced to admit that he had cooperated with him. Despite brutal torture, Pavel did not confess to any anti-state activities, which probably helped him not to be sentenced to death. Main hearing The contrived trial took place on 30 December 1953, and Pavel was sentenced to 25 years in prison for high treason.

He was imprisoned in Leopoldov and Pankrác. During his imprisonment, he asked several times to investigate his case. Following a complaint by the Attorney General against the verdict on 19 October 1955, the Supreme Court acquitted Pavel of all charges.

After his release from prison, he worked in the international department of the Czechoslovak Association of Physical Education and Sports.

=== Return to politics in 1968 ===
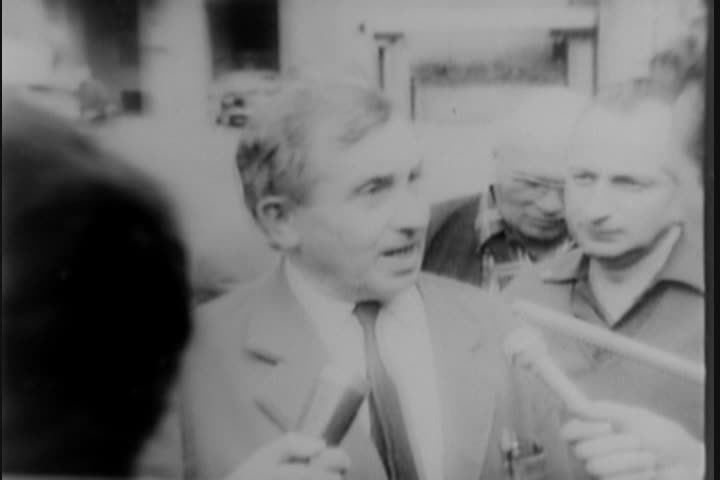
Pavel being interviewed during the Prague Spring, 1968

In April 1968, during the Prague Spring, he was appointed Minister of the Interior in Oldřich Černík's government and tried to reform the security forces. He tried to change the focus of the State Security, mainly on protection against external enemies of the state. He also supported the rehabilitation of victims of political trials.

His reform efforts met with resistance both from StB members and from Soviet officials. After the invasion of Warsaw Pact troops, he was forced to resign and retire, and was later expelled from the Communist Party. His reforms were mostly reversed during the period of normalization. Pavel was under close supervision of the StB until his death in 1973.
