= Polish volunteers in the Spanish Civil War =

Polish fighters in the International Brigades

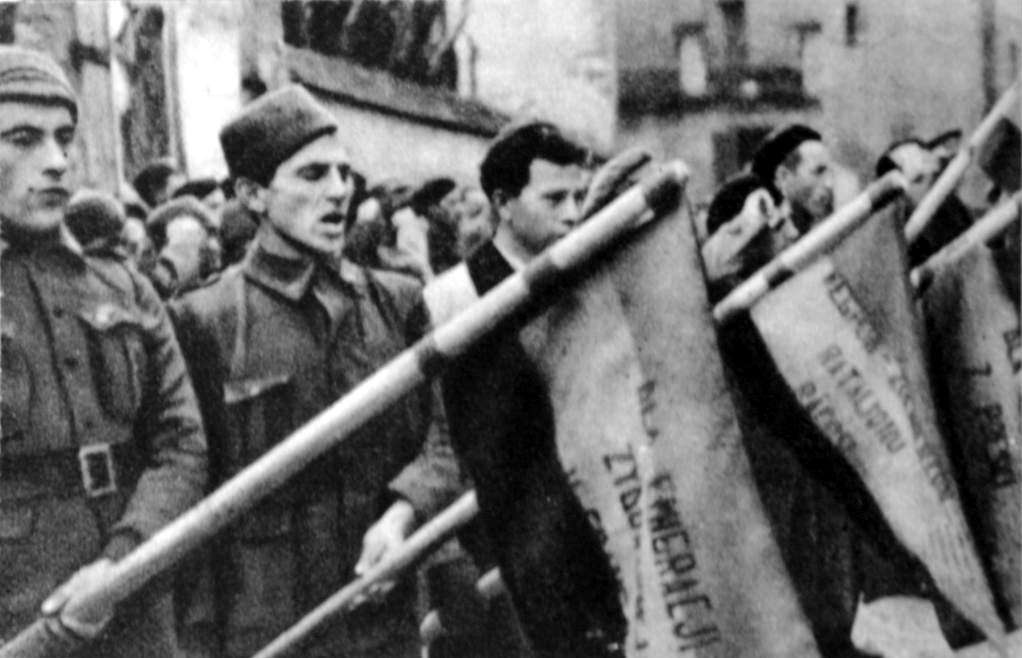
Soldiers of the Brigade.

This article is about volunteers of Polish nationality or extraction who fought for the Spanish Second Republic in the Spanish Civil War. According to André Marty, the Comintern "chief organiser", about 3,000 Poles volunteered for the International Brigades. Elsewhere, it has been calculated that 5,400 Poles fought in Spain. The majority (3,800) were miners working in France, 300 were Polish-Americans, and several hundred were Poles living in various European countries. Only 800 came from Poland itself.

== The Dąbrowszczacy ==
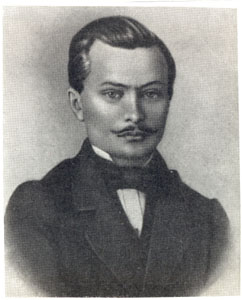
Jarosław Dąbrowski

The International Brigades often named its battalions and brigades using stirring historical symbolism. Such symbols included the Italian leader, Giuseppe Garibaldi, the French anthem, La Marseillaise, and contemporary political figures, such as Ernst Thaelmann. The 19th century Polish general, Jarosław Dąbrowski was an obvious choice, too. General Dąbrowski was involved in the January Uprising, in a plot against Tsar Alexander II and imprisoned. In 1865, he fled and escaped to France. In 1871, he was elected to the Paris Commune and took over the defence of the city. He was killed on the barricades, "fighting gallantly" for a foreign cause.

Throughout the Spanish Civil War, the name Dabrowski was used in addition to the unit designation for units with a Polish connection or component. These include the Dabrowski Battalion, the XIII International Brigade (also known as the 13th Dabrowski Brigade) and the 150th International Brigade. See below.

Even today, in Poland, Polish veterans of the Spanish Civil War are known as the "Dąbrowszczacy".

== The International Brigades ==
The International Brigades were international in character. Initially, for ease of communication, units were grouped by language or ethnicity. As the war progressed, and the casualty rates increased, this policy eased and reinforcements of Spanish conscripts were sent wherever they were required. The following battalions all had strong Polish connections.

== Dabrowski Battalion ==
Raised in October 1936, the Dabrowski Battalion was one of the first international battalions raised. The first Poles to arrive were miners from the Polish mining communities in Northern France and Southern Belgium. Its first commander was Stanislaw Ulanowski (a former corporal in the Polish army); later Major Tadeusz Oppman took command.

== Palafox Battalion ==
The Palafox Battalion was formed on 28 June 1937 as a unit of the 150th International Brigade. It was formed from Poles, and Soviet citizens, with a nucleus of Spanish volunteers from the La Pasionaria Battalion. "Most of the four companies were commanded by Red Army lieutenants". On 4 August 1937, two of its companies were sent to reinforce XIII International Brigade, with the remaining companies following in early October. On 12 October 1936, the Palafox Battalion was merged with Mickiewicz Battalion to form the 4th battalion of XIII International Brigade. It remained with the 13th Brigade until the International Brigades were disbanded on 23 September 1938.

== Mickiewicz Battalion ==
1 Coy: 2 Coy: Naftalí Botwin 3 Coy: Adam Mickiewicz (el 4.Oct.1937 forma batalló) 4 Coy: Taras Szewczenki (6.Jul.1937- 2.Aug.1938) 5 Coy: Ludwig Warynski

== The "Dabrowski" Brigades ==
Main articles: XIII International Brigade and 150th International Brigade

The XIII International Brigade was first formed in December 1936 and named after Jarosław Dąbrowski. Strangely, it did not contain many Poles in its component battalions. The following July (1937), it was disbanded, together with its battalions, and the men and equipment were dispersed amongst the other International Brigades. On 4 August 1937, it re-formed as a predominantly Polish Brigade.

The 150th International Brigade was formed in July 1937.

== After demobilisation ==
Most of Dąbrowszczacy were members of the Communist Party of Poland. For their communist orientation they were condemned by the society and authorities of the Second Polish Republic, which cancelled citizenship of many of them (in spite of the fact that Poland was the third biggest arms supplier to the Republic, after the USSR and Mexico). On the other hand, propaganda portrayed them as heroes in the People's Republic of Poland; many of them served in the Berling Army, Armia Ludowa and Gwardia Ludowa during the Second World War.

The official rehabilitation came when Polish government issued medals to Polish Spanish Civil war veterans. The first was a white-metal badge - the Odznaka Pamiątkowa Dąbrowszczaków (the "Jarosław Dąbrowski Brigade Commemorative Decoration") - issued in 1945 to soldiers of the XIII International Brigade. The second was a white-metal medal - the Medal Za Waszą Wolność i Naszą ("Medal for our freedom and yours") - issued by decree of the State Council of Poland of 18 October 1956. It was awarded to all Polish volunteers who participated on side of the Republic. The ribbon is red with a central white band, reflecting the Spanish Military Order of Merit.

== Notable people ==
- General "Walter" (Karol Świerczewski) - Commanded XIV International Brigade and 35th International Division
- Major "Edward" Bolesław Mołojec - Commanded XIII International Brigade
- Henryk Torunczyk (1909-1966) - Led the "revived" brigade in 1939
- Marian Spychalski - Future Marshal of Poland
- Jozef Strzelczyk - International Brigade commander
- Waclaw Komar - Commanded CXXIX International Brigade (129th International Brigade)
- Stanislaw Ulanowski - Commanded Dabrowski Battalion
- Tadeusz Oppman - Commanded Dabrowski Battalion
- Stanisław Bułak-Bałachowicz - served as an advisor to Franco

== Legacy ==
The motto of the Educational Unit of VALB (Veterans of the Abraham Lincoln Brigade) is "For our freedom and yours", the Dabrowski motto.
