= Poland–Spain relations =

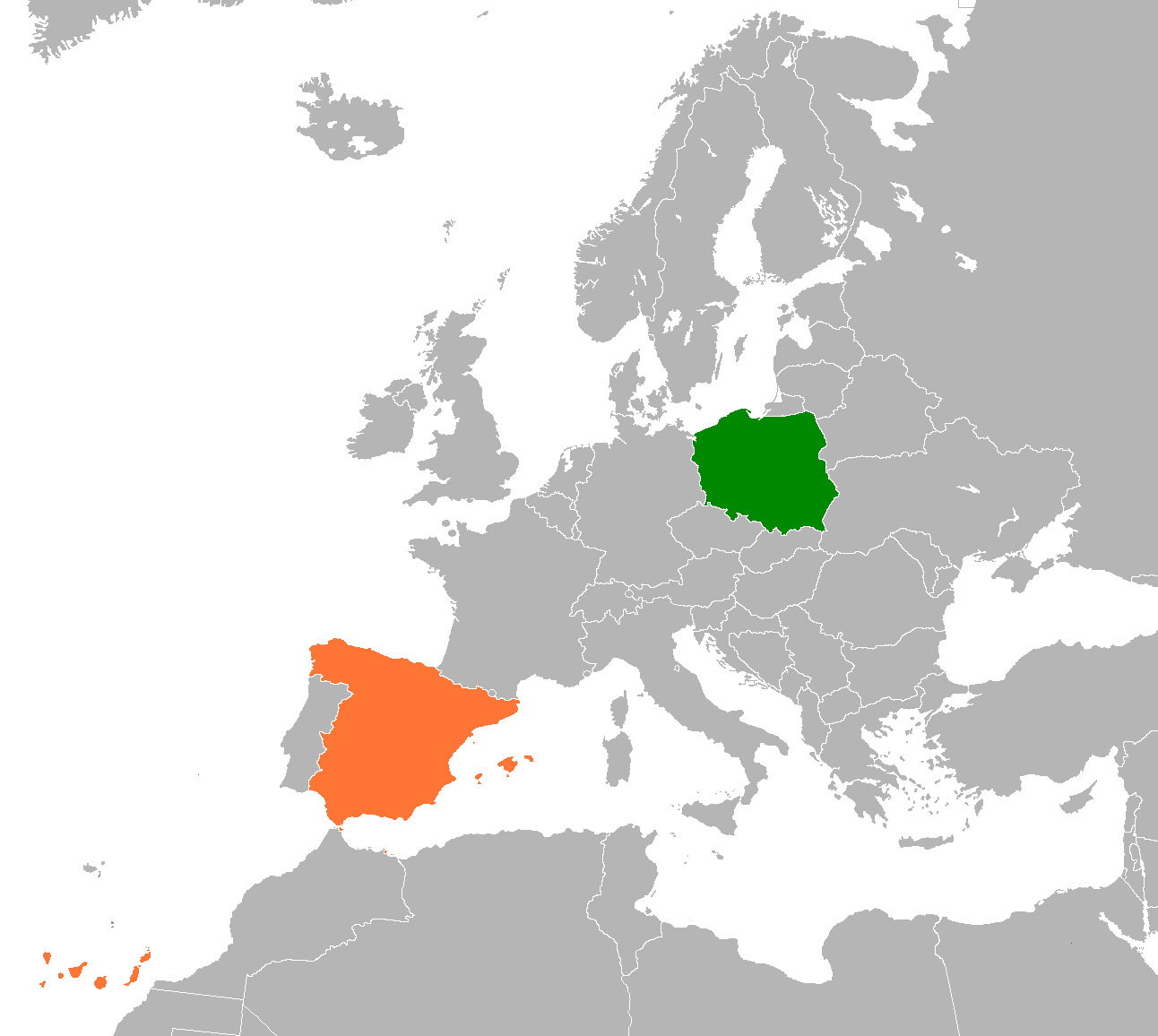
- Poland: Spain

Poland–Spain relations (Polish: Stosunki Polska–Hiszpania; Spanish: Relaciones Polonia-España) are cultural and political relations between Poland and Spain. Both nations are members of NATO, the European Union, OECD, OSCE, the Council of Europe and the United Nations. Spain has given full support to Poland's membership in the European Union and NATO.

== History ==
=== Early history ===
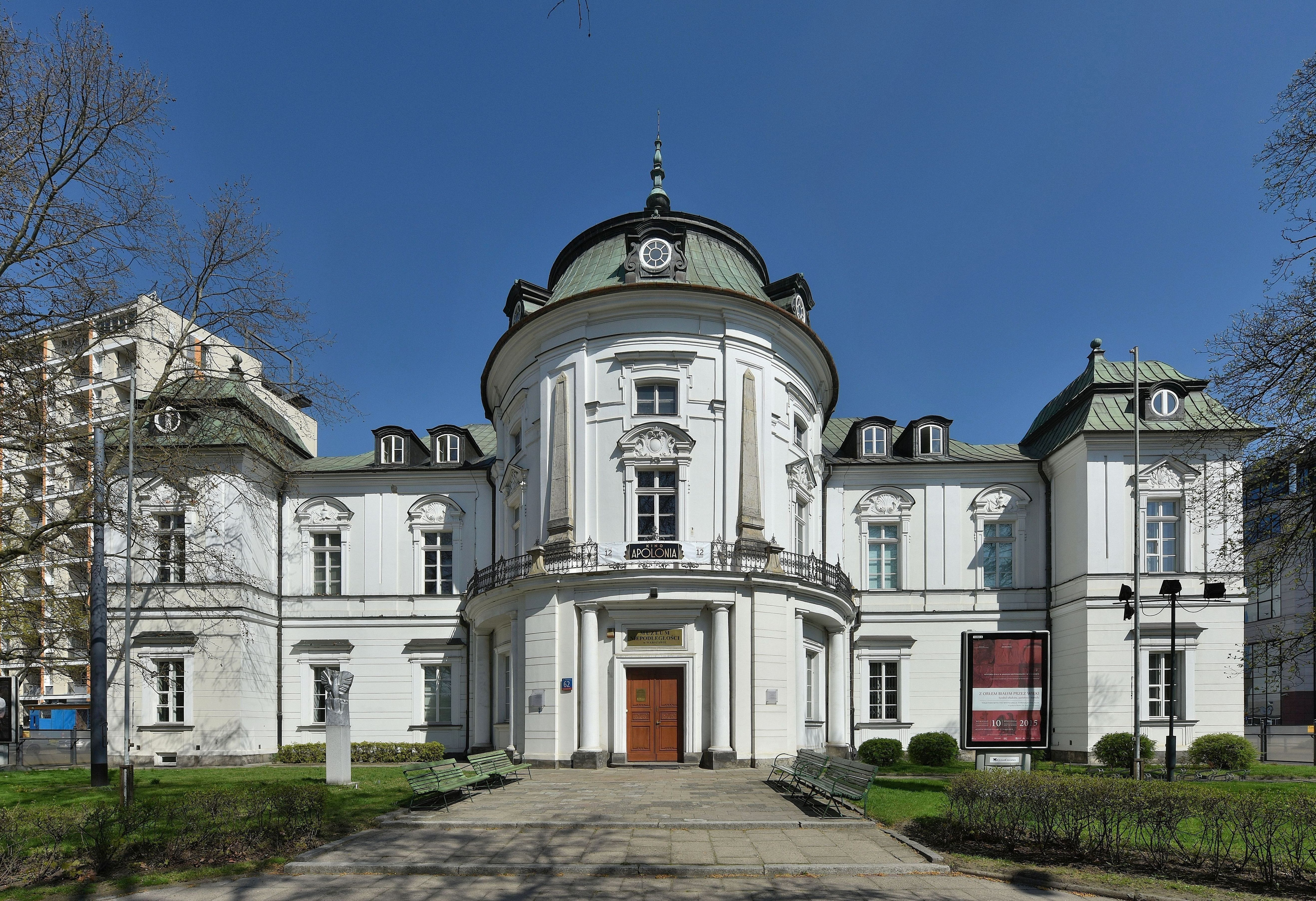
Przebendowski Palace in Warsaw, seat of Spanish ambassador to Poland Count of Aranda in the 1760s

First contact between the Kingdoms of Poland and Spain date to Late Middle Ages, where merchants, travelers and Jesuits traveled between both countries. Early Polish diplomats in Spain in the 16th century included Johannes Dantiscus and Piotr Dunin-Wolski. While the Polish and Spanish forms of governments evolved in a different direction, the diplomacy of both countries was more likely to support one another than not. During Habsburg Spain and Vasa Polish–Lithuanian Commonwealth eras, both countries had an increase in cultural exchange, due to the travel of mercenary soldiers to serve in the Army of the other through Spanish Netherlands and/or Habsburg Austrian monarchy, usually to fight against common enemies during the Ottoman wars in Europe and Religious wars in Europe, as both Catholic monarchies were de facto allies.

In 1557, Queen Bona Sforza of Poland made a loan to King Philip II of Spain, most of which was never repaid, despite Polish diplomatic efforts and requests (see Neapolitan sums). In 1639 the two kingdoms signed a military treaty; however, it has not been implemented. Polish writer and translator Andrzej Chryzostom Załuski was a Polish diplomat in Spain in the 1670s. Spain was the only country to protest over the First Partition of Poland, and in 1795, following the final Third Partition of Poland, Spanish diplomat Don Domingo d'Yriarte was one of the last foreign diplomats to vacate his post in Warsaw.

=== 19th century ===
During the Peninsular War (1809–1814) in Spain, a number of Polish soldiers fought on the side of Napoleon. The Vistula Legion gained fame at the Battle of Saragossa. The Polish Chevau-léger regiment distinguished itself at the Battle of Somosierra in 1808.

Poles formed 22% of the French Foreign Legion, which fought in the First Carlist War of 1833–1840 in Spain, and the Polish Lancers Regiment was formed in Navarre in 1836. Poles of the Lancers Regiment participated in a total of 46 battles. Seven Polish officers were killed or wounded in the war, and 22 Polish officers were awarded the Royal and Military Order of Saint Ferdinand, two non-commissioned officers were awarded the Order of Isabella II, and seven officers were awarded the Order of Isabella the Catholic. 14 Polish officers stayed in Spain after the war and joined the Spanish Army.

In February 1864, Spanish authorities arrested in Málaga a Polish ship with arms and ammunition, which had been organized by Polish émigré activists in Western Europe to support the ongoing Polish January Uprising in partitioned Poland.

Spain operated two consulates in the territory of partitioned Poland, located in Gdańsk and Warsaw.

=== 20th century ===
Poland and Spain re-established diplomatic relations on 30 May 1919, after Poland regained independence in the aftermath of World War I.

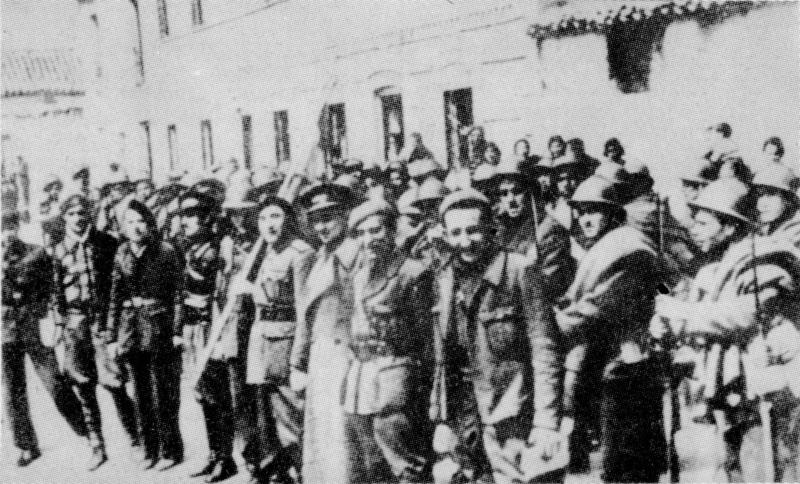
Dabrowski Battalion during the Spanish Civil War

In 1936–1939, a number of Polish volunteers participated in the Spanish Civil War on the Republican side and were primarily assigned to the Dabrowski Battalion. During the Spanish Civil War, the Polish Embassy in Madrid provided shelter and asylum to more than 400 people, Poles and Spaniards, mostly fleeing from Republican forces, but some also from Nationalists. The asylum recipients were men, women and children, people from various social strata with various political views, including survivors of anarchist massacres, e.g. the Cárcel Modelo massacre, merchants, civil servants, lawyers, industrialists, professors, teachers, students, etc. 120 people were successfully evacuated to Marseille, France and Gdynia, Poland, many of whom eventually returned to Spain. Spanish evacuees pointed out the extraordinary hospitality of Poles during their stay in Poland. Honorary Consul of Poland in Valencia Vicente Noguera Bonora was murdered by pro-Republican communist militants just before his planned evacuation from Valencia in August 1936, to which both the Polish government and the Polish Embassy in Madrid responded with an official protest to the then- Republican Spanish authorities.

During World War II, Spain remained neutral and did not participate in the war directly. Despite pressure from Germany, Spain did not close the Polish embassy, which was thus still able to represent the Polish government-in-exile. The Honorary Consulate of Poland in Barcelona organized temporary accommodation, false documents and transport for Polish civilians and military who fled from France to Spain in 1939–1942 with the intention of reaching the Polish-allied United Kingdom. During the war, some Spanish nationals, alike Poles, were imprisoned by the Germans in the Stalag VIII-C prisoner-of-war camp in Żagań, the Sonnenburg concentration camp in Słońsk, and a subcamp of the Gross-Rosen concentration camp in Osła.

In 1945, the German occupation of Poland ended and the country's independence was restored, although with a Soviet-installed puppet communist regime. The Polish government-in-exile was officially recognized by Spain as the Polish government until ‘halfway through 1968’ according to Jacek Majchrowski’s study; diplomatic relations with the People’s Republic of Poland were established only in 31 January 1977, as the government of the People's Republic of Poland refused to recognize the government of General Francisco Franco. A double tax avoidance agreement was signed between the two countries in Madrid in 1979. After the Autumn of Nations and formation of a new, non-communist Polish government, both countries signed a Treaty of Friendship and Cooperation in 1992. In 1998, both countries signed a Common Polish-Spanish Declaration.

=== 21st century ===
Since 2003, irregular bilateral conferences between prime ministers of both nations take place; as of 2012 eight such meetings have taken place.

April 12, 2010, was declared a day of national mourning in Spain to commemorate the 96 victims of the Smolensk air disaster, including Polish President Lech Kaczyński and his wife Maria Mackiewicz.

== High-level visits ==
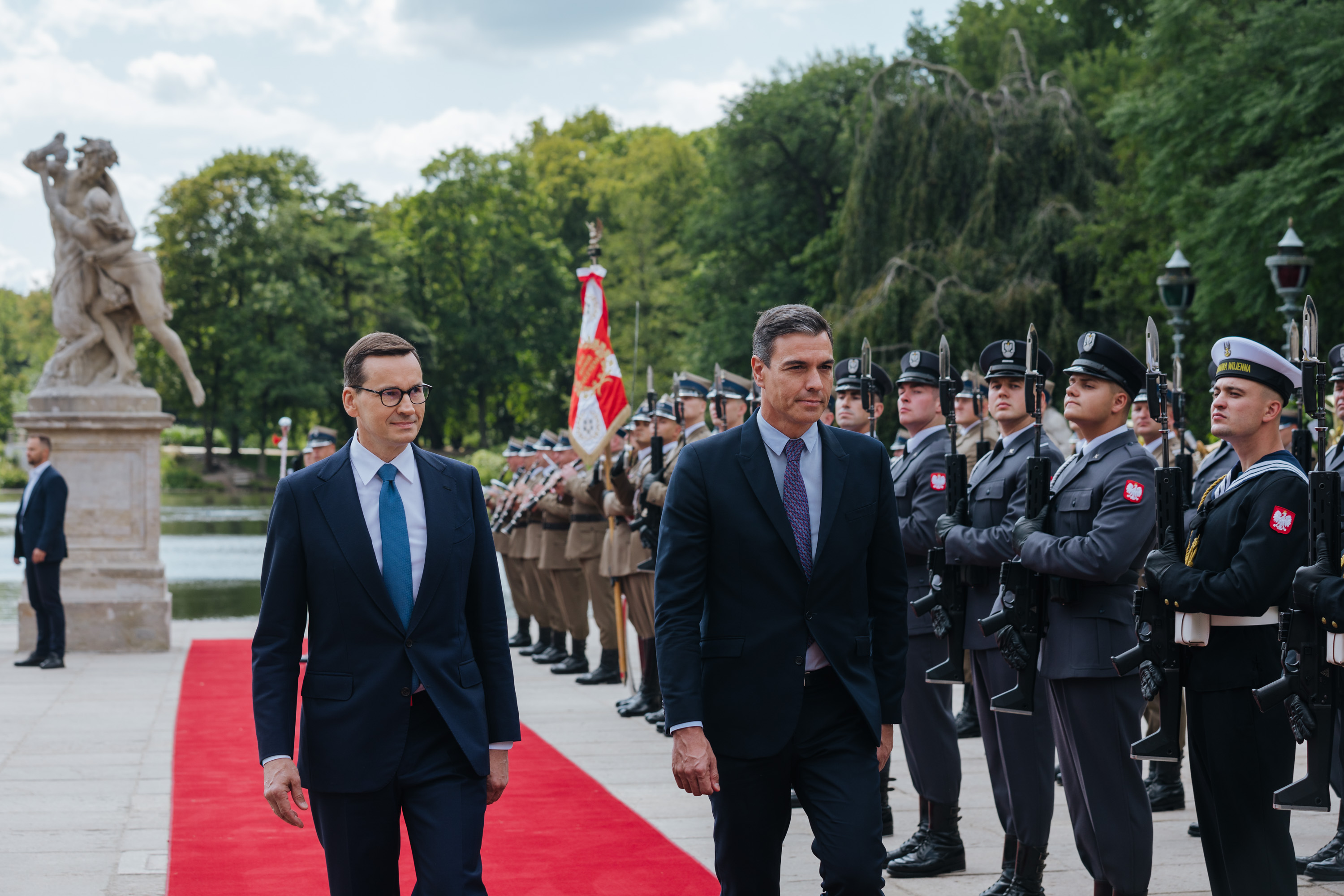
Polish Prime Minister Mateusz Morawiecki and Spanish Prime Minister Pedro Sánchez in Warsaw; July 2022.

Presidential and Prime Ministerial visits from Poland to Spain

- Prime Minister Tadeusz Mazowiecki (1990)
- President Aleksander Kwaśniewski (2003)
- Prime Minister Kazimierz Marcinkiewicz (2006)
- President Lech Kaczyński (2008)
- Prime Minister Donald Tusk (2008, 2011, 2013, 2014)
- President Bronisław Komorowski (2011)
- Prime Minister Ewa Kopacz (2015)
- Prime Minister Mateusz Morawiecki (2021)

Royal and Prime Ministerial visits from Spain to Poland

- King Juan Carlos I of Spain (1989, 2001)
- Prime Minister José María Aznar (2004, 2007)
- Prime Minister José Luis Rodríguez Zapatero (2005, 2007, 2009, 2011)
- Prime Minister Mariano Rajoy (April and June 2012, 2014, 2016, 2017)
- Prime Minister Pedro Sánchez (2018, 2022, 2024)
- King Felipe (2020, 2025)
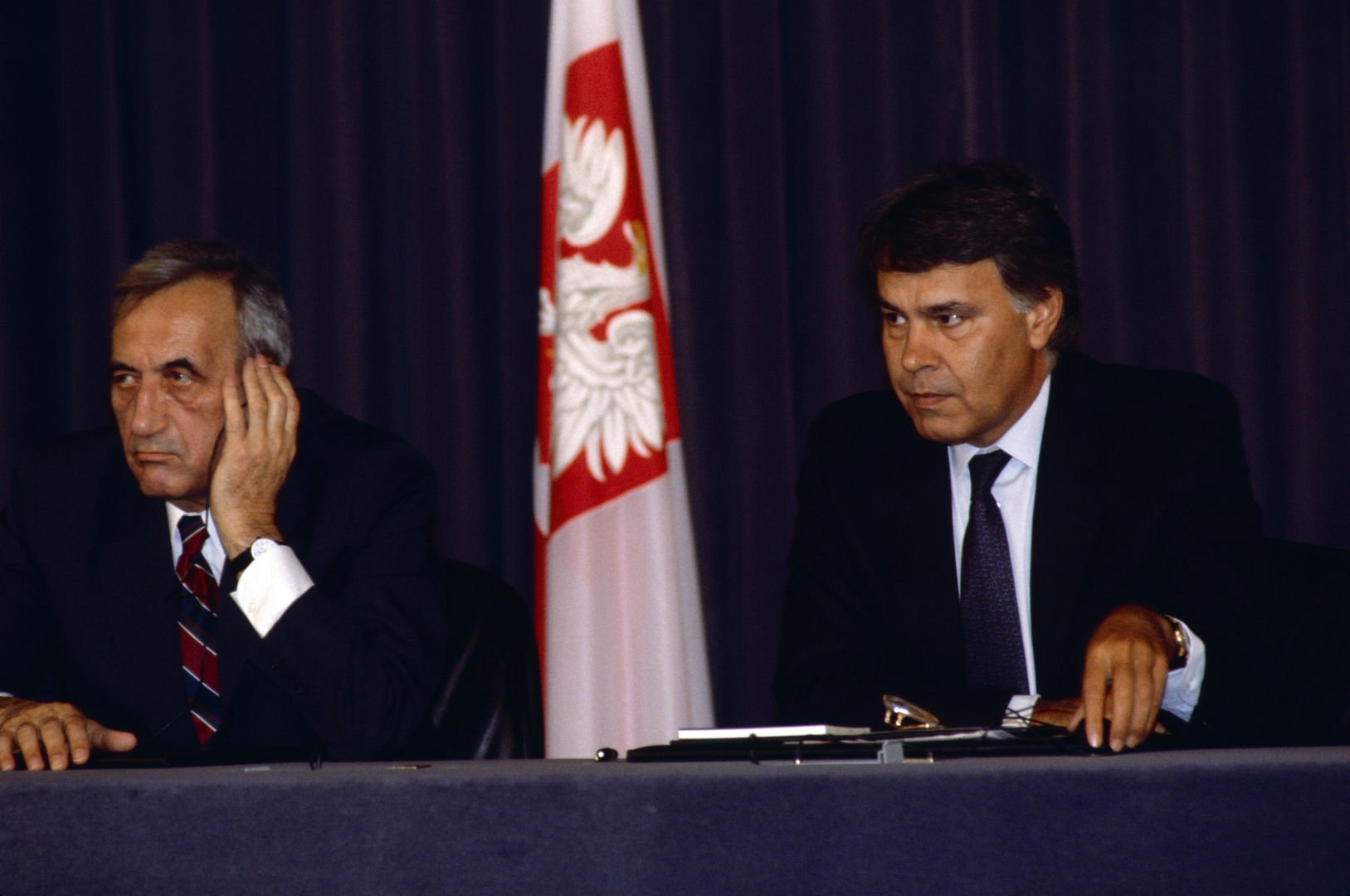
Prime Ministers Tadeusz Mazowiecki and Felipe González in Madrid; 1990.

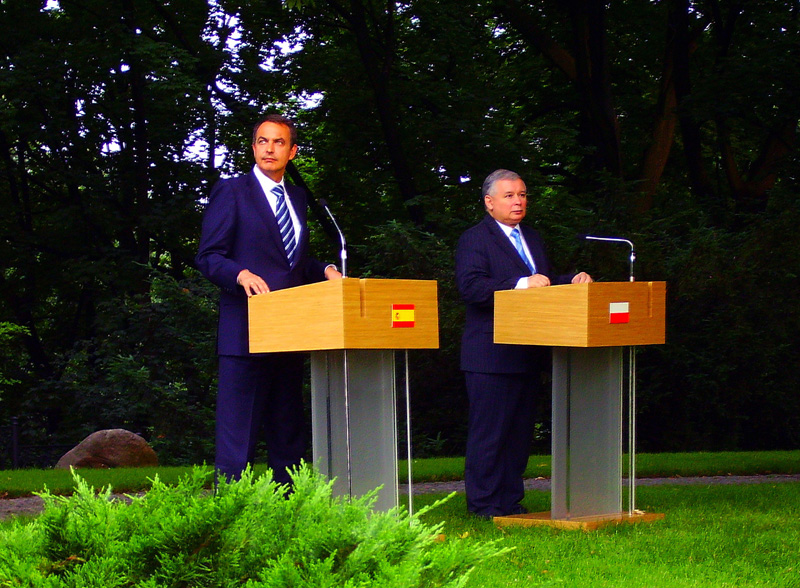
Prime Ministers José Luis Rodríguez Zapatero and Jarosław Kaczyński in Warsaw; June 2007.

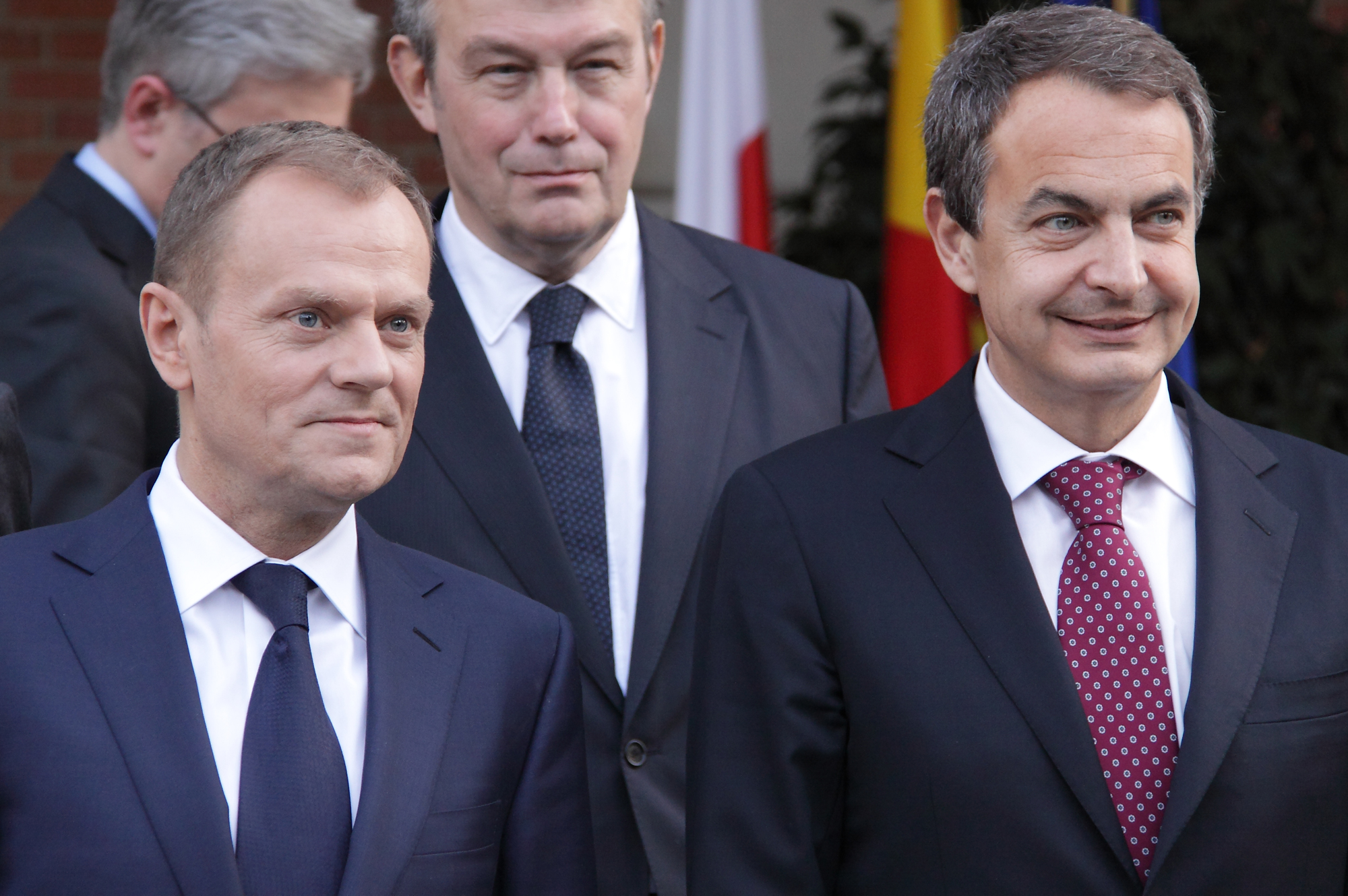
Prime Ministers Donald Tusk along with José Luis Rodríguez Zapatero in Madrid; March 2011.

== Cultural relations ==
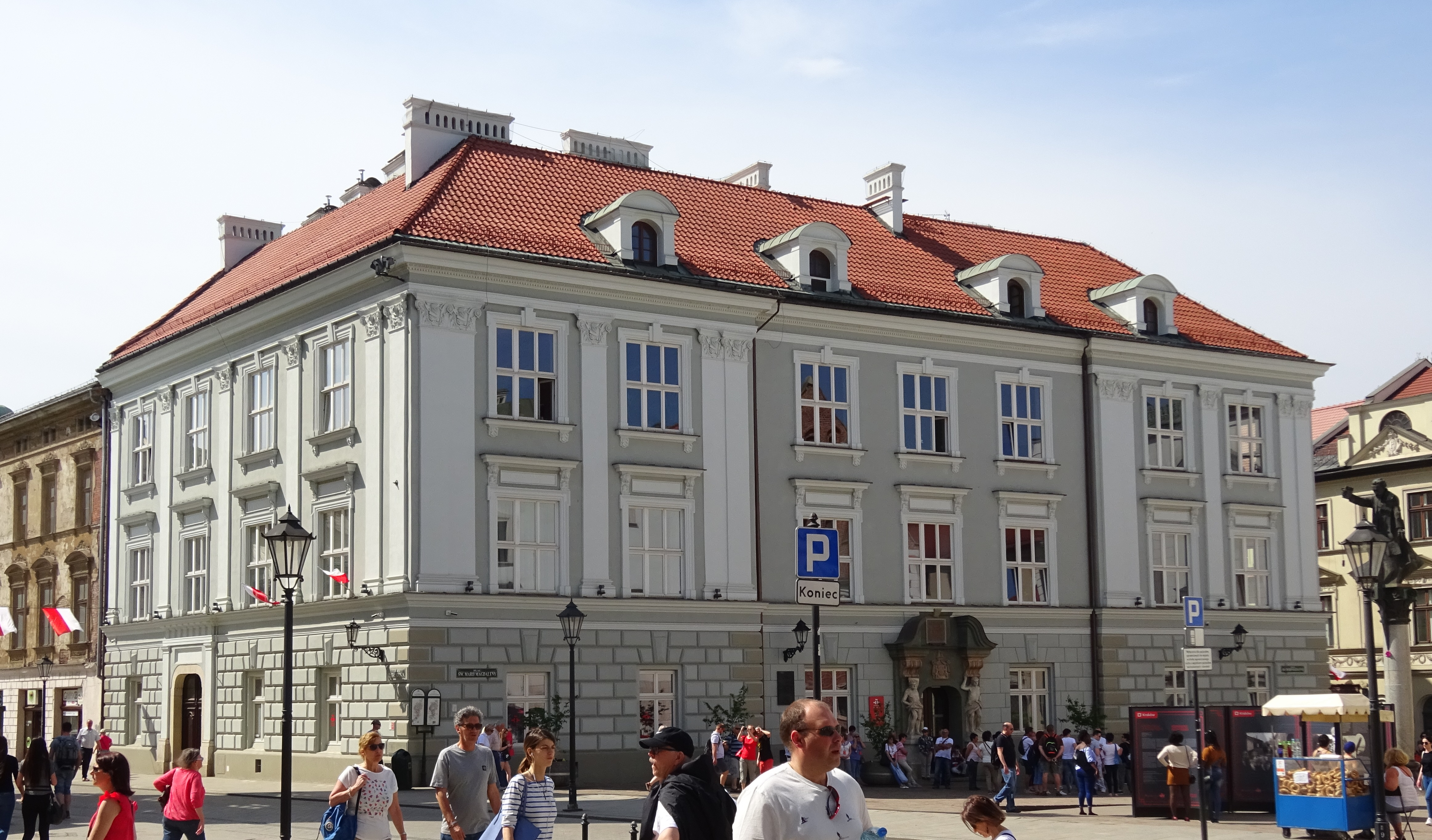
Seat of the Instituto Cervantes in Kraków, Poland

Certain ties in Polish and Spanish cultures can be explained by the fact that Poland and Spain had the highest percentage of petty nobility in Europe (hidalgos, szlachta), which encouraged ties between educated elites, and mutual references. Even more importantly, both countries also shared a strong Catholic history, on the frontier of struggles against Islamic conquest (Antemurale Christianitatis, Reconquista). Spain had a significant influence on Polish culture, particularly in literature. Spanish works have been translated into Polish and Spain was a setting of some famous Polish works such as The Manuscript Found in Saragossa, and influenced major Polish literary figures, such as Juliusz Słowacki.

In the 21st century both governments promoted their partner's culture at home, with the Polish Year in Spain in 2002 and the Spanish Year in Poland in 2003. There are Cervantes Institutes in Warsaw and Kraków, and a Polish Institute in Madrid. Spain is a popular tourist destination for Poles, with about half a million of Poles visiting Spain each year. The Spanish language is a popular foreign language in Poland.

== Polish community in Spain ==
Spain has an estimated Polish community of 100,000 people, many who arrived to Spain after World War II and after Poland joined the European Union in 2004.

== Trade ==
In 2025, trade between Poland Spain totaled €19.6 billion Euros. Poland's main exports to Spain include: automobile, machinery, pharmaceutical products, electronics and furniture. Spain's main exports to Poland include: automobiles, electrical equipment, electronics and machinery. In 2016, Spanish companies invested €171 million Euros in Poland, becoming the 6th largest foreign direct investor in the country.

== Resident diplomatic missions ==
of Poland in Spain

- Madrid (Embassy)
- Barcelona (Consulate-General)

of Spain in Poland

- Warsaw (Embassy)

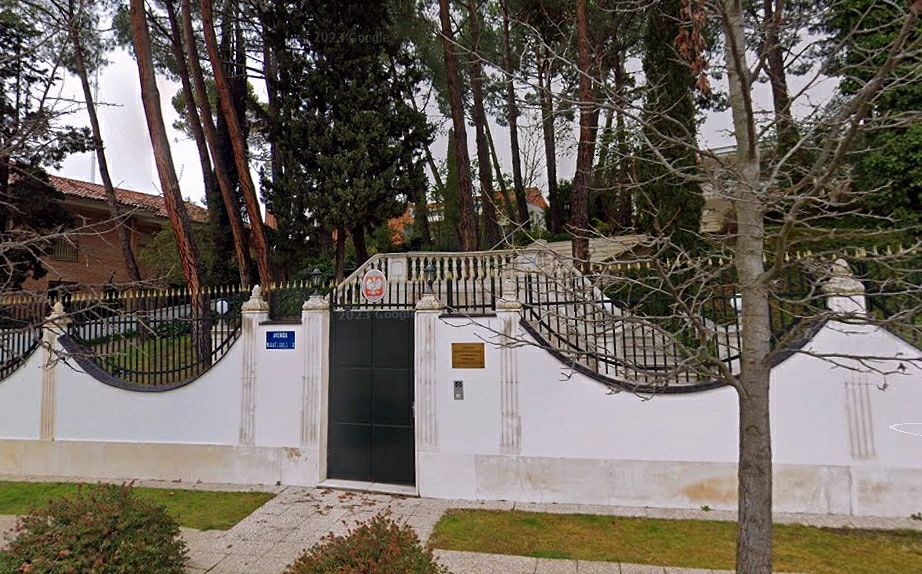
Embassy of Poland in Madrid

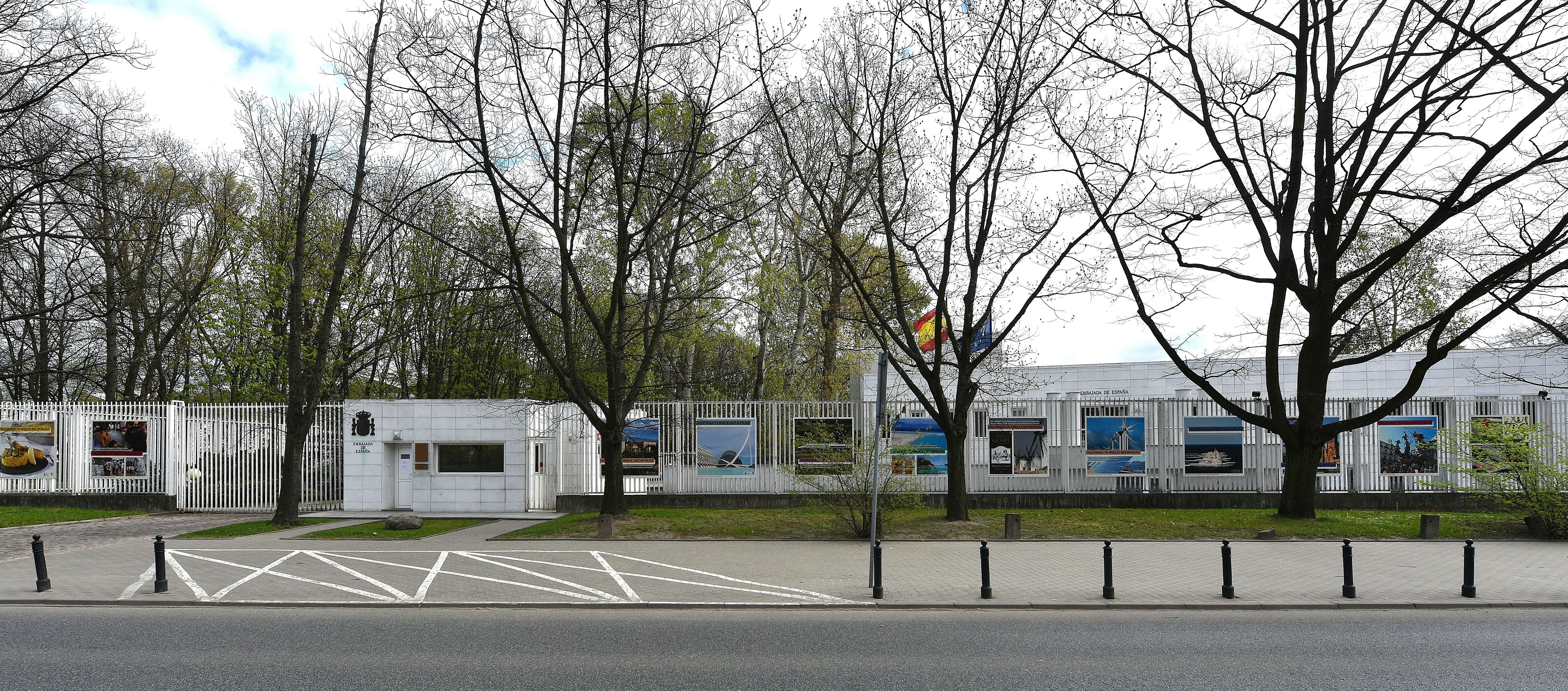
Embassy of Spain in Warsaw

== See also ==
- Foreign relations of Poland
- Foreign relations of Spain
- Dabrowski Battalion
- Poles in Spain
