= 45th Division (Spain) =

45th Division (45th International Division) 45.ª División
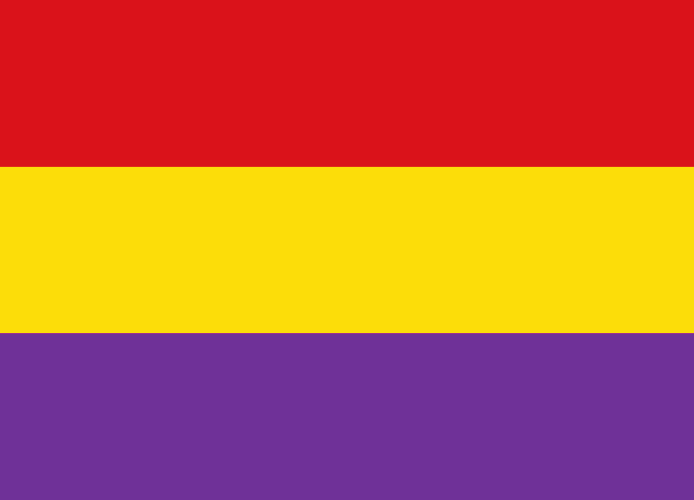
- Military flag of the Popular Army
- Active: June 1937 – February 1939
- Country: Spanish Republic
- Branch: Spanish Republican Army
- Type: Infantry division
- Role: Home Defence
- Part of: 18th Army Corps (1937); 21st Army Corps (1937 - 1938); 5th Army Corps (1938)
- Nickname: "45.ª División Internacional"
- Engagements: Spanish Civil War: Huesca Offensive; Battle of Brunete; Aragon Offensive; Battle of Zaragoza; Battle of the Ebro; Catalonia Campaign

Commanders
- Notable commanders: Manfred Stern (Emilio Kléber); Hans Kahle (Jorge Hans)

Flag of the International Brigades.

Map of Spain in November 1938. In pink the two regions under Republican control.

The 45th Division (Spanish: 45.ª División) was a division of the Spanish Republican Army in the Spanish Civil War.

This unit was established in mid 1937 in order to gather some scattered units of the International Brigades under one command, therefore it was also known as "45.ª División Internacional" (45th International Division). It took part in some of the major battles of the conflict such as Brunete, Zaragoza and the Battle of the Ebro persistently being afflicted by numerous casualties.

== History ==
The establishment of the 45th Division took place at the Aragon Front June 1937 during the planning period of the Huesca Offensive. It was initially foreseen as a provisional unit and even before it became operational General Lukács, the head of the unit grouping, died after being hit by an artillery shell and was replaced by "Emilio Kléber", the first de facto commander of the division. After the crashing failure of the new unit at the combats of the Huesca Offensive in June, the 45th Division was brought to the Madrid Front in order to take part in the Battle of Brunete under Kléber's leadership. Even though it began well at Brunete, the division did not succeed in meeting its assigned targets and ended up suffering numerous casualties.

In August it went back to the Aragon Front in order to take part in the Aragon Offensive as part of the so-called Agrupación B, together with an artillery group and an engineer battalion. Sent to a front of scant activity Kléber's troops advanced without difficulty until they had to halt as they arrived at a distance of 6 km from Zaragoza. In the exposed flat terrain the troops were defenseless against the fierce attacks of the artillery and the planes of the rebels. Owing to the poor performance of the unit under his command, Kléber was replaced by Hans Kahle and the human losses were covered by new reinforcements. Wladislaw Stopzyk, a new political commissar, was assigned to the unit.

In February 1938 the 45th Division fought briefly at the Extremaduran Front, where it had a measure of success in some combats. But very soon it was rushed again to the Aragon Front where it took part in the effort to halt the overwhelming Aragon Offensive of the rebels. However, the attempt proved futile and the division joined the other Republican units in the massive withdrawal that ensued. By April the rebel troops led by General Antonio Aranda reached the Mediterranean Sea dividing the Spanish Republic in two and the 45th Division would remain locked in Catalonia, becoming detached from the 129th International Brigade, which had remained in the mountainous territory south of the Ebro. Isolated from the remaining Republican territory, the 45th Division was made part of the 5th Army Corps led by Lt. Colonel Enrique Líster. During the months that followed the division managed to rearm and was reinforced by the 139th Mixed Brigade in order to be able to participate in the upcoming Battle of the Ebro. During the offensive the division held its ground against the deadly attacks of the Francoists, ending up with a very high number of casualties, especially the XIV International Brigade —part of the division— which suffered huge losses during the failed attempt to cross the Ebro River near Amposta.

Following the withdrawal of the International Brigades in October 1938, the division was reorganized with Spanish leaders and recruits. Its last commander was Francisco Romero Marín, a communist war veteran. It is known that the 45th Division took part in the first hopeless Republican efforts of trying to contain the rebel onrush of the Catalonia Campaign, but it soon had to withdraw northwards to the French border. After crossing the frontier line in early February 1939 the fleeing Republican troops were disarmed and interned in concentration camps by the French authorities and the division was terminated.

== Order of Battle ==
| Date | Army Corps | Mixed Brigades | Battlefront |
|---|---|---|---|
| June 1937 | - | XII and 150th | Huesca |
| 9 July 1937 | 18th Army Corps | XII and 150th | Brunete |
| December 1937 | 21st Army Corps | XII and XIII | Aragon |
| March 1938 | 21st Army Corps | XII, XIV and 129th | Aragon |
| 30 April 1938 | 5th Army Corps | XII, XIV and 139th | Ebro |

== Leaders ==
Commanders

- General Manfred Stern (since June 1937)
- Militia Lt. Colonel Hans Kahle (since October 1937)
- Militia Major Luis Rivas Amat (since 23 September 1938)
- Militia Major Ramón Soliva Vidal (since 7 November 1938)
- Militia Lt. Colonel Francisco Romero Marín (since 17 January 1939)

Chiefs of Staff

- François Bernard.
- Miguel Ángel San Cruz (since May 1938)

Commissars

- Augusto Vidal Roget;
- Wladislaw Stopzyk, member of the International Brigades (since 1 September 1937)
- François Vittori, member of the International Brigades (since 7 March 1938)
- José Sevil Sevil, member of the Spanish Communist Party (PCE) (since September 1938)

== See also ==
- Mixed Brigades

== Bibliography ==
- Alpert, Michael (1989). El Ejército Republicano en la Guerra Civil. Madrid: Siglo XXI de España. ISBN 978-84-323-0682-2.
- Álvarez, Santiago (1989). Los comisarios políticos en el Ejército Popular de la República. Ediciós do Castro.
- Engel Masoliver, Carlos (1999). Historia de las Brigadas mixtas del Ejército popular de la República, 1936-1939. Madrid: Editorial Almena. ISBN 84-96170-19-5.
- Salas Larrazábal, Ramón (2006). Historia del Ejército Popular de la República. La Esfera de los Libros S.L. ISBN 84-9734-465-0.
- Thomas, Hugh (1976). Historia de la Guerra Civil Española. Barcelona: Círculo de Lectores. ISBN 84-226-0874-X.
