= Naftali Botwin Company =

Jewish volunteer unit during the Spanish Civil War

- Active: 12 December 1937 – 23 September 1938
- Country: Jews from (Second Polish Republic) Poland, France, Belgium and Mandatory Palestine
- Allegiance: Republican Spain
- Branch: International Brigades
- Type: Foreign volunteer
- Role: Infantry
- Size: 150 men
- Part of: Palafox Battalion
- Patron: Naftali Botwin
- Motto: "For our Freedom and your Freedom"
- Engagements: Spanish Civil War

The Naftali Botwin Company was a unit of the Comintern's International Brigades which was made up from Jewish volunteers from various different countries.

== History ==
In 1936 a Parisian communist by the name of Albert Nahumi suggested to the leadership of the International Brigades to create a separate Jewish unit. The idea was initially rejected and Nahumi was killed in combat in action, but in 1937 progressive Jewish circles in Paris began to push once again for the creation of the unit. Finally, on 12 December 1937, an order of the day was issued forming the Naftali Botwin Company as a part of the 13th Polish Dabrowski Battalion. It wasn't an entirely new company, but rather a renaming of the existing 2nd company of the Palafox Battalion of the 13th Dabrowski Battalion. The company was named after Naftali Botwin, a communist Polish Jew who was executed in 1925 for the murder of a police informant in Lwów.

The company numbered 150 men and included Jewish volunteers from Poland, France, Belgium, Mandatory Palestine, and Spain, and fought alongside additional volunteers from Yugoslavia and Hungary. It also published a Yiddish newspaper "Botwin". Only 18 of the original 150 volunteers survived the war. The unit fought until the disbanding of the International Brigades in October 1938, and some of its members would go on to serve in the Polish Resistance during World War II.
