= CL International Brigade =

150th International Brigade Dabrowski Brigade (bis.) 150.ª Brigada Internacional
- Active: 27 May 1937 - 4 August 1937
- Country: Mostly Polish but also included Hungarians and Spaniards
- Allegiance: Spain
- Branch: International Brigades
- Type: Mixed Brigade
- Role: Infantry
- Size: 1,910 men
- Part of: 45th Division
- Nickname: Dabrowski or Dombrowski Brigade
- Motto: Za wolność waszą i naszą (For your freedom and ours)
- Engagements: Spanish Civil War: Huesca Offensive; Battle of Brunete

Commanders
- Notable commanders: Fernando Gerassi; Jan Barwiński

The 150th International Brigade, also known as "Dabrowski Brigade" (Spanish: Brigada Dombrowski or Brigada Dabrowski), was a military unit of the International Brigades during the Spanish Civil War. Its members were mostly Polish, but there was also a Spanish battalion, as well as a Hungarian section.

== History ==
This relatively short-lived mixed brigade was established on 27 May 1937 as the Dabrowski Brigade (Brigada Dabrowski), officially the 150th International Brigade of the loyalist army under the leadership of Fernando Gerassi. It was initially formed by the Dabrowski Battalion, the André Marty Battalion and the Rakosi Battalion which were sent to the Aragon Front as part of the new unit.

Later, in order to make up for the heavy losses incurred during the Huesca Offensive in mid June, a new battalion was added, the José Palafox Battalion. The CL International Brigade took part in the Battle of Brunete in July as part of the 45th Division, also known as "45th International Division", led by Kléber. At that time the brigade had 1,910 men distributed in four battalions. Is performance was poor and it suffered heavy losses during the combats, ending up quite battered when the operations in the Brunete area came to an end. Thus, on 4 August the CL International Brigade was disbanded and its battalions were transferred to other units of the International Brigades. Most of the men of the defunct unit ended up in the XIII International Brigade.

=== Posthumous honors ===
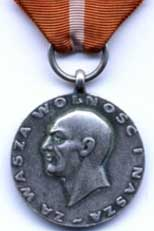
'Za wolność waszą i naszą' 1956 medal.

The postal service of the Polish People's Republic issued two stamps in 1946 and one in 1966 commemorating the Brigada Dombrowski. Also two pieces of postal stationery were issued, one in 1946 and another in 1986.

In 1956 the government of the Polish People's Republic established the award 'Za wolność waszą i naszą' for the members of the Polish Brigade in Spain (Dąbrowszczacy).

== Structure ==
Some of the battalions of the CL International Brigade were transferred from other units, while others were established anew. The brigade included the following battalions during the time of its existence:

- Dabrowski Battalion also known as the Dombrowski Battalion – exiled Polish volunteers
- Djuro Djakovic Battalion – Yugoslav volunteers
- André Marty Battalion – Franco-Belgian volunteers (named after André Marty).
- Rakosi Battalion – Polish and Hungarian volunteers
- Adam Mickiewicz Battalion – Polish volunteers
- José Palafox Battalion – Polish and Spanish volunteers

== See also ==
- International Brigades
- International Brigades order of battle
- XIII International Brigade, also Dabrowski Brigade

== Bibliography ==
- Beevor, Antony. The Battle for Spain. The Spanish Civil War 1936–1939. Penguin Books. London. 2006. ISBN 0-14-303765-X
- Engel, Carlos. Historia de las Brigadas Mixtas del E. P. de la República, Almena. Madrid. 1999. ISBN 84-922644-7-0
- Salas Larrazábal, Ramón. Historia del Ejército Popular de la República, La Esfera de los Libros, Madrid. 2006. ISBN 84-9734-465-0
- Thomas, Hugh. The Spanish Civil War. Penguin Books. London. 2001. ISBN 978-0-14-101161-5
