= Máté Zalka =

Hungarian writer, soldier and revolutionary

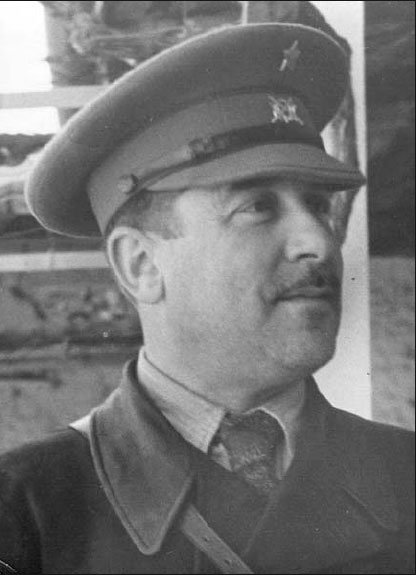
- Zalka during the Spanish Civil War
- Born: Frankl Béla; 23 April 1896; Tunyogmatolcs, Austria-Hungary
- Died: 11 June 1937 (aged 41); Huesca, Spain
- Burial place: Kerepesi Cemetery, Budapest, Hungary
- Other names: Máté Zalka, General Lukács
- Military career
- Allegiance: Austria-Hungary; Russian SFSR; Spanish Republic
- Branch: Royal Hungarian Honvéd; Red Army; International Brigades
- Service years: 1914–1937
- Commands: XII International Brigade; 45th Division
- Conflicts: World War I; Eastern Front; Russian Civil War; Polish–Soviet War; Kiev offensive; Turkish War of Independence; Spanish Civil War; Huesca Offensive †

Béla Frankl (23 April 1896 – 11 June 1937), known by the name Máté Zalka, was a Hungarian writer, soldier, and revolutionary. He fought in the Royal Hungarian Army during the First World War and was captured by the Imperial Russian Army. Subsequently, while a Russian prisoner of war, he came under the influence of Bolshevism and fought during the Russian Civil War. After participating in various other conflicts for the Soviet Union, Zalka moved to Spain and fought in the Spanish Civil War as a general for the International Brigades. He was killed on June 22, 1937, near Huesca when his car was hit by artillery fire. His remains were brought back to Hungary, where he was buried in the Kerepesi Cemetery in Budapest.

== Biography ==
=== Early life ===
Máté Zalka (born as Béla Frankl), was a Hungarian Jew born on April 23, 1896, in Tunyogmatolcs, Austria-Hungary. He received his education at Polgári Iskola, a high school located in Mátészalka, where he later adopted his new name. Zalka was the natural son of Zsigmond Szalkay of Mateszalka.

=== Hungary in World War I ===
Zalka lied about his age to volunteer in the Royal Hungarian Honvéd at the age of 18 and fought in Italy and on the Russian front during World War I, where he was taken prisoner by the Russians in 1917. Subsequently, he came under the influence of Bolshevism and fought during the Russian Civil War against the White formations.

=== Russian Civil War ===
Zalka formed an international group of Red Guards in Khabarovsk in February 1918 during the Russian Civil War and fought against the White formations in Siberia. At the end of World War I, Zalka chose to stay in Russia instead of returning to Hungary, where he met his future wife, Vera. They had one daughter, who later died due to complications from the Chernobyl disaster.

=== GPU operational activities ===
Zalka was a military commander who fought in the Battle of Kyiv against Poland in 1920 and later served as the commander of a cavalry regiment of the VCK GPU from 1921 to 1923. He was an ataman who had considerable support from the local population, but many of his actions resulted in punitive operations against civilians. Zalka also participated in the Turkish War of Independence under the pseudonym "General Lukács."

While he was a prisoner of war, he organized the prisoners' theater. He was director of the "Theatre of Revolution" (now called the "Mayakovsky Theatre") in Moscow (1925–1928).

=== Spanish Civil War ===
Zalka moved to Spain in 1936 and joined the International Brigades to fight in the Spanish Civil War in November of that year. Under the assumed name of Pál Lukács and with the rank of General, he initially commanded the XII International Brigade and later the 45th Division. In 1937, he was killed near Huesca when his car was hit by artillery fire. Zalka is mentioned in a number of works by Hemingway.

His remains were originally buried in the south of Spain. However, decades after his death, Zalka's nephew (who also fought in the Spanish Civil War) was invited by the Spanish royal family to a ceremony celebrating the end of the civil war. He was able to carry Zalka's remains to Hungary, where they were buried in the Kerepesi Cemetery in Budapest along with other high-ranking Hungarian military officers.
