= Rákosi Battalion =

- Active: 1937–1938
- Country: Spanish Republic
- Branch: International Brigades
- Type: Infantry battalion
- Part of: CL International Brigade; XIII International Brigade
- Patron: Mátyás Rákosi
- Engagements: Spanish Civil War: Huesca Offensive; Aragon Offensive; Battle of the Ebro

Commanders
- Notable commanders: Ákos Hevesi †

The Rákosi Battalion was a volunteer unit founded in April 1937. It was formed predominantly of Hungarians, who fought in the CL International Brigade and the XIII International Brigade during the Spanish Civil War (1936–39). The battalion was named after Mátyás Rákosi, then a political prisoner in Miklós Horthy's Hungary, later leader of the Hungarian People's Republic.

It was initially part of the CL International Brigade which was disbanded on 4 August 1937, and thereafter the battalion became part of the XIII International Brigade.

The Battalion's first action (with 288 men) was in the Huesca Offensive in June 1937. The battalion became trapped by machine-gun fire and lost a quarter of its men. Their commander, Ákos Hevesi, and political commissar, Imre Tarr, were both killed as they led from the front.

At the start of the Battle of the Ebro, on 25 July 1938, the battalion led the XIII International Brigade and 35th Division across the river near Ascó, initially advancing quickly.

== Personnel ==
- Ákos Hevesi – Hungary. Commander. Killed in the Huesca Offensive, June 1937
- Ferenc Münnich – Hungary. Political commissar. Became Chairman of the Council of Ministers of Hungary from 1958 to 1961.
- László Rajk – Hungary. Political commissar. Became Hungarian foreign secretary, was accused of espionage, and shot after a show trial in Hungary in 1949.
- Imre Tarr – Hungary. Political commissar. Killed in the Huesca Offensive, June 1937

== See also ==
- XIII International Brigade
- CL International Brigade
