= Palafox Battalion =

- Active: 28 June 1937 – 23 September 1938
- Country: (Second Polish Republic) Poland
- Allegiance: Republican Spain
- Branch: International Brigades
- Type: Infantry battalion
- Part of: CL International Brigade; XIII International Brigade
- Patron: José de Palafox, 1st Duke of Zaragoza
- Engagements: Spanish Civil War: Battle of Brunete; Zaragoza Offensive; Battle of the Ebro

The Palafox Battalion was a volunteer unit of largely Polish and Spanish composition in the International Brigades during the Spanish Civil War. It was named after José de Palafox, a Spanish general who successfully fought French Napoleonic forces during the Peninsular War.

== History ==
The Palafox Battalion was formed on 28 June 1937 as a unit of the CL International Brigade. On 4 August 1937, two of its companies were sent to reinforce the XIII International Brigade and the remaining companies followed on 12 October 1937. At that time the Palafox Battalion was merged with the Mickiewicz Battalion to form the 4th battalion of XIII International Brigade. It remained with the XIIIth Brigade until the International Brigades were demobilised on 23 September 1938.

It was formed from Poles, Soviet citizens, with a nucleus of Spanish volunteers from the Pasionaria Battalion and had a larger Soviet component than most battalions. It was commanded by a Major Tkachev, and most of the four companies were led by Red Army lieutenants. It also contained Jews, Ukrainians, Belarusians and Lithuanians.

== Organisation ==
It had five companies of which No. 2 was a specifically Jewish unit.

- 1 Coy:
- 2 Coy: Naftalí Botwin
- 3 Coy: Adam Mickiewicz
- 4 Coy: Taras Szewczenko
- 5 Coy: Ludwik Warynski

=== Adam Mickiewicz Company ===
It was common practice in the International Brigades to build new battalions around existing veteran companies and the Palafox Battalion's third company was used as the nucleus for the Mickiewicz Battalion.

=== Naftali Botwin Company ===
This company was formed of Jewish volunteers and was a sub-unit of the Palafox Battalion during the Spanish Civil War. It was named after Naftali Botwin, a Polish Jew who was executed in 1925 for killing a police informer.

=== Background ===
The idea of a separate Jewish unit was first put forward to Luigi Longo and André Marty in Albacete by "Albert Nahumi" (Arieh Weits), a French Communist Party leader in October 1936. The idea was well received and a call for volunteers went out. However, Nahumi died shortly afterwards and the idea was not progressed. A year later, the idea was resurrected and pressure was put on Longo and Marty by a group of influential Paris communists.

On 12 December 1937, the Naftali Botwin Company was established by renaming and reforming No. 2 Company of the Palafox Battalion into an officially Jewish unit. The new company had about 150 members from Poland, France, Belgium, Palestine and Spain. Its flag bore the Dabrowski motto ("For your freedom and ours") in Yiddish and Polish on one side, and in Spanish on the other. It also had its own anthem, Der March der Botvin-soldaten ("March of the Botwin Soldiers"). The lyrics were by Olek Nuss, who survived wounds in Spain only to be executed in Nazi-occupied France. It was published in Botwin, the journal of Yiddish-speaking soldiers in Spain, in November 1938.

=== Political dimension ===
By the end of 1937, the International Brigades were facing significant difficulties, both in Spain and abroad. Its supply of volunteers was drying up, as a result of high casualties and stories circulated by returning volunteers about harsh discipline and appalling conditions. The blockade on arms and materiel, organised by the Non-Intervention Committee was also having its effect. As Zaagsma writes: The International Brigade was one of the Comintern's most powerful propaganda tools ... Given the high proportion of Jews in the various communist parties, a Jewish fighting unit was a powerful propaganda tool.

== See also ==
- Gershon Dua-Bogen
- List of military units named after people
