= XII International Brigade =

XII International Brigade Garibaldi Brigade
- Flag of the International Brigades
- Active: 1936–1939
- Country: Mostly Italian
- Allegiance: Spanish Republic
- Branch: International Brigades
- Type: Mixed Brigade
- Role: Infantry
- Part of: 14th Division (1937); 11th Division (1937); 35th Division (1937); 45th Division (1937–1939)
- Garrison/HQ: Albacete, Barcelona
- Nickname: Brigada Garibaldi
- Engagements: Spanish Civil War

Commanders
- Notable commanders: Máté Zalka; Randolfo Pacciardi

The XII International Brigade was mustered on 7 November 1936 at Albacete, Spain. It was formerly named the Garibaldi Brigade, after the most famous and inspiring leader in the Italian Independence Wars, General Giuseppe Garibaldi.

== Structure ==
Its first commanding officer was a Soviet advisor of Hungarian origin, Gen. "Pavol Lukács" (Máté Zalka), who went on to command the 45th Division of the Spanish Republican Army (he was killed during the Huesca Offensive), and its first political commissar was Gustav Regler.

The brigade included, among others, the following battalions:

- Garibaldi Battalion – Albanian, Italian and Spanish volunteers, led by Randolfo Pacciardi.
- André Marty Battalion – Franco-Belgian volunteers (named after André Marty).
- Dabrowski Battalion also known as the Dombrowski Battalion – exiled Polish volunteers
- Thaelmann Battalion – German and Austrian volunteers (named after Ernst Thälmann), led by Ludwig Renn.
- Figlio Battalion – Spanish volunteers
- Madrid Battalion – Spanish volunteers
- Prieto Battalion – Spanish volunteers

The Brigade fought in the battles of Madrid, the Corunna Road, Guadalajara, Guadarrama and Brunete.

== See also ==
- International Brigades
- International Brigades order of battle
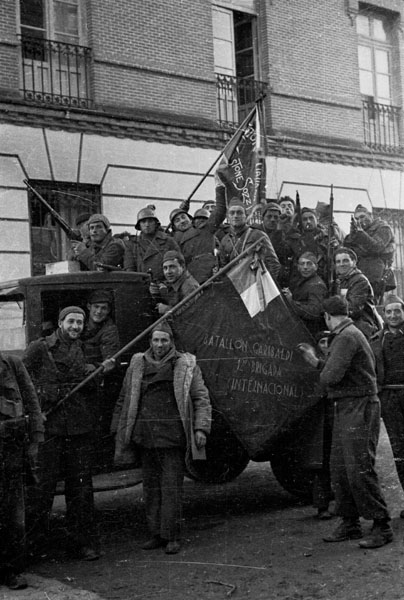
  Troops of the Garibaldi Battalion, XII International Brigade. November 1936.

== Bibliography ==
- Beevor, Antony. The Battle for Spain. The Spanish Civil War 1936–1939. Penguin Books. London. 2006. ISBN 0-14-303765-X
- Thomas, Hugh. The Spanish Civil War. Penguin Books. London. 2001. ISBN 978-0-14-101161-5
