= Poles in Spain =

Poles in Spain Polacy w Hiszpanii
Total population
- 52,495 (2022); 0.95% of Spain's foreign population 0.11% of Spain's population

Regions with significant populations
- All over Spain, especially Madrid, Barcelona, Valencia, Andalusia

Languages
- Polish, Spanish

Religion
- Roman Catholicism, Judaism

Related ethnic groups
- Poles, Spaniards, Silesians

Poles in Spain or Polish-Spaniards are citizens and/or residents of Spain whose ethnic origins lie fully or partially in Poland.

== Demographics ==
The Polish minority in Spain numbered approximately 52,495 according to 2022 census figures. The Polish population is mainly guest workers drawn by Spain's economic boom during the 1990s. Madrid, Barcelona, Málaga, Huelva and Valencia have significant Polish populations.

Year	Population	Change
1998	5,521	—
2001	13,469	144%
2004	27,862	106.9%
2006	45,797	64.4%
2008	78,560	71.5%
2010	86,324	9.9%
2012	84,281	-2.4%
2014	69,471	-17.6%
2016	57,234	-17.6%
2018	52,446	-8.4%
2020	53,418	1.9%
2022	52,882	-1.0%
2024	59,132	11.8%

== Poles in the Spanish Civil War ==
Approximately 5,400 volunteers of Polish origin participated in the Spanish Civil War as part of the International Brigades. The majority (3,800) were miners working in France, 300 were Polish-Americans, and several hundred were Poles living in various European countries. Only 800 came from Poland itself.

== Notable people ==
- Luis José Sartorius, 1st Count of San Luis, noble, politician and journalist
- László Kubala, former football player
- Enrique Múgica Herzog, politician
- Maria Amalia of Saxony, queen consort of Spain, queen consort of Naples and Sicily
- Adam Karol Czartoryski, aristocrat
- Yarek Gasiorowski, football player
- Esther Koplowitz, businesswoman magnate and philanthropist
- Alicia Koplowitz, businesswoman magnate
- Tamara Czartoryska, sportswoman and model
- Adam Jezierski, actor

== See also ==
- Great Emigration – Period when large numbers of educated people fled Poland and Lithuania, 1831 to 1870
- Masurians – Lechitic ethnic group of northeastern Poland
- Poland – Country in Central Europe
- Poland–Spain relations
- Polish diaspora – People of Polish heritage who live outside Poland
- Silesians – Inhabitants of the Silesia region
