= XIII International Brigade =

XIII International Brigade Dąbrowski Brigade
- Active: 1936–1939
- Country: Polish, Spanish, Hungarian and Balkans
- Allegiance: Spain
- Branch: International Brigades
- Type: Mixed Brigade – Infantry
- Role: Home Defence
- Part of: 14th and 35th Division (1937); 45th Division (1937–1938); 35th Division (1938–1939)
- Garrison/HQ: Albacete
- Nickname: Brigada Dombrowski
- Engagements: Spanish Civil War

Commanders
- Notable commanders: Wilhelm Zaisser; Vincenzo Bianco; Józef Strzelczyk; Mihail Kharchenko; Boleslaw Molojec

The 13th International Brigade – often known as the XIII Dąbrowski Brigade – fought for the Spanish Second Republic during the Spanish Civil War, in the International Brigades. The brigade was dissolved and then reformed on four occasions.

== 1st Formation ==
The brigade was first mustered at the International Brigade headquarters in Albacete in December 1936. The custom was to name Brigades on formation after inspirational "heroes of the Left". The 13th Brigade was named after Jarosław Dąbrowski, a Polish general who died on foreign soil, fighting in the defence of the Paris Commune in 1871. It consisted of three battalions, and three artillery batteries.

- Louise Michel (1) Battalion
- Chapaev Battalion / Czapajew Battalion
- Vuillemin Battalion
- 1st Battery "Ernst Thaelmann"
- 2nd Battery "Karl Liebknecht"
- 3rd Battery "Antoni Gramsci"

== 2nd Formation ==
The brigade was reformed on 4 August 1937, from Central European battalions. It again used Jarosław Dąbrowski as its exemplar.

- Dąbrowski Battalion – Polish and Spanish
- Palafox Battalion – Polish Jews, Belarusians, Lithuanians, Ukrainians, Spanish, Balkan.
- Rakosi Battalion – Hungarian, Spanish.
- Đuro Đaković Battalion – Yugoslav.

It was dissolved on 23 September 1938, along with the other International Brigades, when the Negrin Government decided to send foreign volunteers home. This decision was taken after pressure from the Non-Intervention Committee to remove all foreign volunteers from both sides of the conflict in an endeavour to de-internationalise it. Negrin acquiesced because he believed the Nationalists would send their foreigners home too.

== 3rd formation ==
The brigade was again reformed (in Monredón) on 1 October 1938 from exclusively Spanish conscript battalions.

== 4th formation ==
In mid-January 1939, in Palafrugell, Catalonia, a group of Polish and Balkan volunteers requested permission of André Marty to return to fight the Nationalists' Catalonia Offensive. On 23 January, they were formed into the XIII International Brigade. It was placed in charge of a young second lieutenant. The unit soon fell apart.

== Brigade Staff ==
Brigade Commanders:

- Gen Wilhelm Zaisser "Gomez" (German)

Chiefs of Staff:

- Albert Schreiner "Schindler" (German)

Brigade Commissars:

- Ferry (Italian)

== See also ==
- CL International Brigade, also known as "Dabrowski Brigade"
- Ukrainian interbrigade company Taras Shevchenko
