= Mickiewicz Battalion =

- Flag of the Battalion
- Active: 27 October 1937 – 23 September 1938
- Country: (Second Polish Republic) Poland
- Allegiance: Republican Spain
- Branch: International Brigades
- Type: Infantry
- Size: Battalion
- Part of: XIII International Brigade
- Patron: Adam Mickiewicz
- Engagements: Spanish Civil War: Battle of the Ebro

Commanders
- Notable commanders: Franek Ksiezarczyk

The Mickiewicz Battalion was a volunteer battalion of the International Brigades during the Spanish Civil War. It formed part of the XIII International Brigade from 27 October 1937 until 23 September 1938, when the International Brigades were disbanded. It was named after Adam Mickiewicz (1798–1855), a Polish poet and patriot.

In July 1938 The Battalion took part in the Battle of the Ebro crossing the river and initially advancing quickly attacking and capturing many Nationalist troops at La Venta de Camposines, before moving on to near Gandesa. By September 1938 they were dug in defending a difficult position on the road from Corbera d'Ebre under constant bombardment and machine gun fire, the only respite being at night. They continued to dig trenches and lay barbed wire. After an artillery bombardment, the Battalion continued a heroic defence against tanks and cavalry which saw many of their best men killed, before the order for withdrawal came.

== Personnel ==
- Franciszek Księżarczyk - commander
- Mieczyslaw Schleyen - political commissar
- Zygmunt Mołojec
- Bolesław Mołojec

== See also ==
- List of military units named after people
