= Bolesław Mołojec =

Polish resistance member

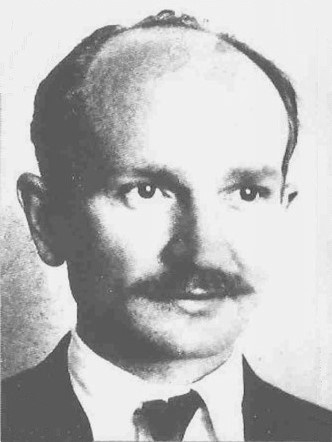
- Portrait of Mołojec from the collections of the Archives of Modern Records, c. 1940
- Born: 9 February 9 February 1909; Henryków, Piotrków Governorate, Congress Poland
- Died: 31 December 1942 (aged 33); Warsaw, General Government
- Cause of death: Executed
- Military career
- Allegiance: Second Spanish Republic; Third International
- Rank: Major
- Nicknames: Edward; Długi
- Unit: Dabrowski Battalion
- Commands: XIII International Brigade; People's Guard
- Known for: Leader of the Polish Workers' Party
- Conflicts: Spanish Civil War; World War II

Bolesław Mołojec (pronounced [ˈbɔlɛslav ˈmɔwɔjɛt͡s]; born 9 February 1909, Henryków – died 31 December 1942, Warsaw), known under noms de guerre "Edward" and "Długi", was a Polish communist activist and commander of International Brigades during the Spanish Civil War.

He served in the leadership of the Communist Party of Poland's (KPP) youth organisation in 1935–1936; disciplined by the Soviet leadership in 1936, a fact that later counted in his favour after Stalinist authorities had purged KPP. Mołojec put himself in charge of the Polish Workers' Party (PPR) after the 1941 German invasion of the Soviet Union. He was assassinated by his own peers.

== Biography ==
In his youth Mołojec studied and worked in Tomaszów Mazowiecki, he was also the organiser of anti-capitalist lectures and protests.

Before World War II, Mołojec volunteered for the Polish units of the International Brigades in the Spanish Civil War. He took the nom de guerre "Major Edward", became prominent in the Dabrowski Battalion, and ended up commanding the XIII International Brigade.

In 1939, the Comintern put him in charge of the provisional leadership centre in Paris, responsible for re-grouping the purged Polish communist movement. However, little was achieved in the atmosphere of suspicion surrounding the decimated KPP. In 1940, Mołojec was ordered to Moscow and attempts to re-form the KPP were abandoned by the Soviets.

Mołojec was attached to the Initiative Group parachuted into the General Government in December 1941, to establish the PPR. With Marceli Nowotko and Paweł Finder, he formed the leadership troika. He was in charge of the generally unsuccessful efforts to establish a military underground, the Gwardia Ludowa, and launch guerrilla warfare against the German occupation forces.

In November 1942, when Nowotko was killed in mysterious circumstances, Mołojec put himself in charge of the PPR. Some weeks later, Mołojec was executed by Jan Krasicki on the orders of Finder, Fornalska, Władysław Gomułka and Franciszek Jóźwiak, held responsible for arranging Nowotko's murder, a charge that has never been entirely convincingly proven.

In the Polish People's Republic, Mołojec was for many years a nonperson whose role in the Spanish Civil War and the formation of the PPR and its military wing were concealed or glossed over.
