= Henryków, Gmina Lubochnia =

Henryków
- Village
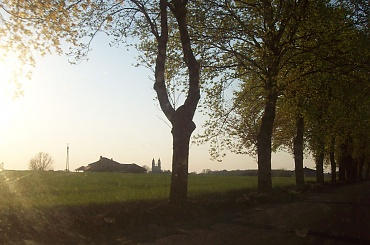
- Church in Lubochnia on the horizon

- Location within Poland
- Coordinates: 51°36′N 20°4′E
- Country: Poland
- Voivodeship: Łódź
- County: Tomaszów
- Gmina: Lubochnia

Henryków [xɛnˈrɨkuf] is a village in the administrative district of Gmina Lubochnia, within Tomaszów County, Łódź Voivodeship, in central Poland.
