= Tunyogmatolcs =

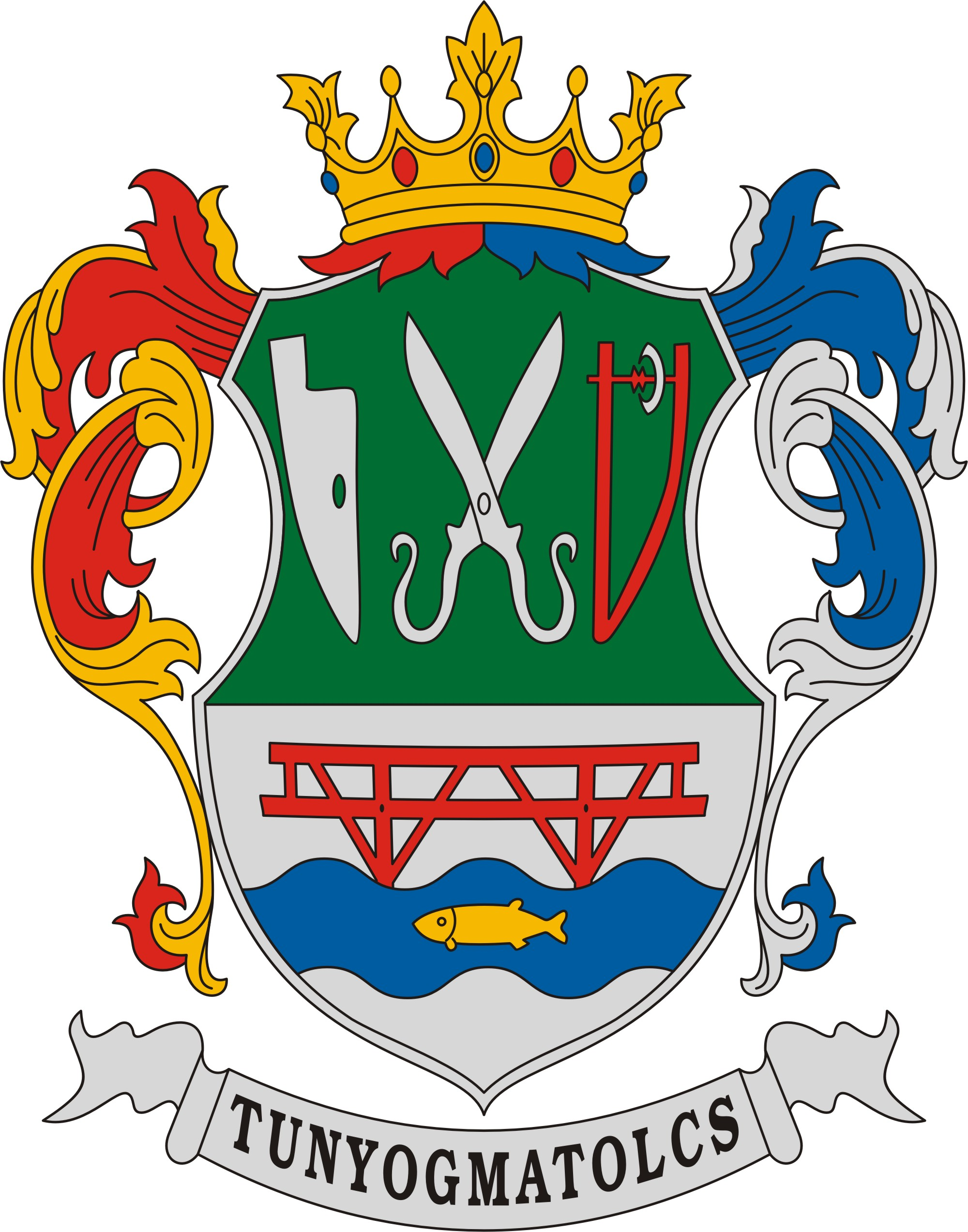
- Coat of arms

- Location of Tunyogmatolcs in Hungary
- Coordinates: 47.971285°N 22.455527°E
- Country: Hungary
- Region: Northern Great Plain
- County: Szabolcs-Szatmár-Bereg

Area
  - Total: 26.28 km^{2} (10.15 sq mi)

Population (2015)
  - Total: 2,430
  - Density: 92.5/km^{2} (239/sq mi)
- Time zone: UTC+1 (CET)
  - Summer (DST): UTC+2 (CEST)
- Postal code: 4731
- Area code: +36 44
- Website: https://tunyogmatolcs.hu/

Tunyogmatolcs is a village in Szabolcs-Szatmár-Bereg county, in the Northern Great Plain region of eastern Hungary.

== Geography ==
It covers an area of 26.28 km^{2} (10 sq mi) and has a population of 2430 people (2015).

It is located in the eastern part of the county, on the left bank of the river Szamos. Today's settlement is crossed by Holt-Szamos; the part of the settlement to the west of it was Tunyog, while Matolcs, in the state before the regulation of the river, lay on its right bank, today it is located in an area enclosed by a backwater and a living river.

== History ==
The settlement arose from the merger of two villages, Tunyog and Matolcs. The two settlements merged in 1950, but separated in 1957 and reunited in 1961.

The name Tunyog first appears in 1335 and can be traced back to the Slavic personal name Thunugh, a descendant of the Tunyogi family, considered to be their ancient estate in the Kata genus.

The church of Tunyog, which was under the protection of St. Thomas, as well as the part of the estate of the clararis nuns of Óbuda – was handed over to the Csaholy monastery according to a 1347 perpetuity.

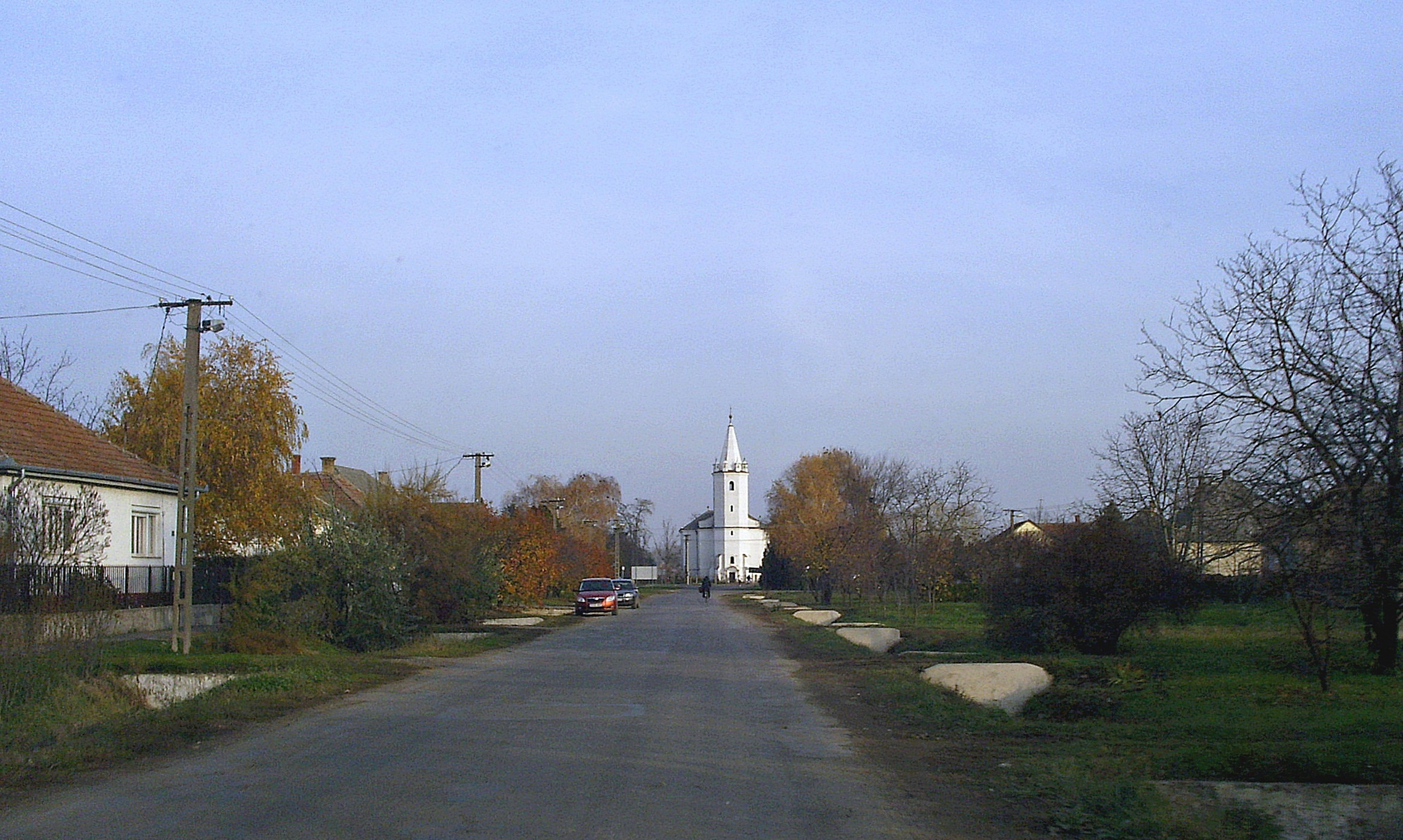
Tunyogmatolcs, Hungary

After the extinction of the Tunyogi family, the Daróczi Narrow Family received a royal donation to half of the village in 1378, then in 1547 to the Bithiri Melith and Petrichevich families; In 1592 Nagykállai Leökös Lőrinc; 1630 Kozák Rácz János; In 1717 Mihály Korda, in 1725 János Géressy. Until the middle of the 19th century, the families of Count Károlyi, Korda, Ilosvay and Szűcs were landlords of the settlement.

Matolcs inherited his name from the Matucsinay family. (The name of the castle, to which Possesio Matochina belonged in 1387, is mentioned in the form of Castrum Matuchyna.) In 1436, the king took the property from the Matucsinayas (for the second time because of their infidelity) and donated it to the Baths. After the extinction of the Báthori family, Gábor Bethlen acquired the right of possession to his two nephews, but György I. Rákóczi took over their share.

The settlement gained the status of a market town already in the 17th century, and in 1707 it also gained the right to a fair.

The county held its assembly here several times, including in 1669 and 1707.

The citizens of the market town were engaged in handicrafts. The guild industry of pottery, filter and tumbler flourished. The inhabitants of Matolcs were famous filter taps, their guild certificate dates from 1714, when they won another trade fair.

In 1776, the free citizens of Matolcs were forced to process the wool of the Ecsedi estate, and the settlement was registered as part of the Ecsedi estate.

In 1810 Matolcs became almost exclusively part of the Károlyi family. Some families even shared the remaining plots: Lajos Luby, Zoltán Kölcsey, Móricz Klein, whose names are still preserved in the fields bordering the settlement.

=== Jewish history ===
==== Tunyog ====
During the 1848/49 Revolution and War of Independence, Róth Bertalan became a "farmer national guard". Kreismann Bernát and Kreismann Márton were traders. Jewish traders of Tunyog were known for selling plums. From 1909, Kreismann Bernát, who received several honors during World War I and served as a sergeant, engaged in grain trade. Kesztenbaum Endre, wounded in World War I, retired as a sergeant major with honors. Ungár Mór, a trader, retired in a leadership position with honors. Ungár Lajos and Weisz Ivor, lieutenants, died heroically. Groszmann Mór, a trader who fought in World War I, opened a shop in 1919 and became a municipal representative. From 1930, Hirschfeld Andor, a farm manager, led Klein Andor's estate. Starting from 1933, Kesztenbaum Endre leased the roller mill, which employed five people. In 1941, there were 70 Jews living in the settlement. After the Holocaust, no Jew remained in Tunyog.

==== Matolcs ====
In the 1850s, there were 22 Jews living in the settlement, which accounted for 2.34 percent of the total population. The name Ungár Mór, a merchant, has survived from the 1930s. In 1941, a total of 40 individuals were counted. However, in 1947, there were no Jews left in Matolcs.

It is also known that a person by the last name Kreismann, who returned to Matolcs from the US before 1944, and when he returned, he was reported to the gendarmes and was incarcerated in the ghetto. He tried to flee from there, but he didn't succeed. Later, he even jumped off the deportation train, but that attempt also failed. He died six days before the liberation.

== Famous people ==
Máté Zalka (1896–1937) was born in Matolcs.

András Széles (1963-), zither artist, Young Master of Folk Art.

Karola Kiss (T. Kiss K) (1972-), Hajdú-Bihar County Territorial Prize Award-winning painter

Dr. László Bálint Gacsályi (1941–2014), veterinarian
