= Jarosław Dąbrowski =

Polish-French noble, military officer, rebel, and activist (1836–1871)

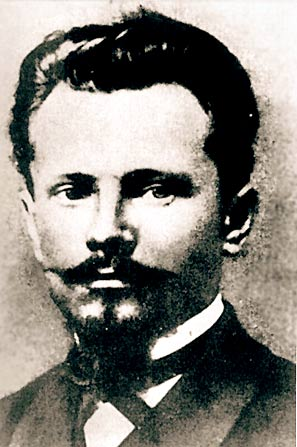
- Jarosław Dąbrowski, 1871
- Nicknames: Żądło, Łokietek
- Born: 13 November 1836; Zhitomir, Volhynian Governorate, Russian Empire (now Zhytomyr, Ukraine)
- Died: 23 May 1871 (aged 34) Paris, France
- Allegiance: Russian Empire; Polish National Government; Paris Commune
- Branch: Imperial Russian Army; Central National Committee; Communards; National Guard
- Service years: 1845–1864; 1871
- Rank: Staff captain and Quartermaster; Insurgent leader; Commander-in-chief/General
- Commands: National Guard
- Conflicts: Caucasian War; January Uprising; Paris Commune †
- Awards: Order of Saint Stanislaus
- Family: Radwan coat of arms

Jarosław Żądło-Dąbrowski (Polish pronunciation: [jaˈrɔswav ˈʐɔndwɔ dɔmˈbrɔfskʲi]; 13 November 1836 – 23 May 1871), also known as Jaroslav Dombrowski, was a Polish nobleman (szlachta member) and military officer in the Imperial Russian Army, a Polish nationalist and radical republican for Poland, and general and military commander of the Paris Commune in its later period. He was a participant in the Polish 1863 January Uprising and one of the leaders of the "Red" faction among the insurrectionists as a member of the Central National Committee and the Polish Provisional National Government.

== Early life ==
Dąbrowski was born in 1836, after the Partitions of Poland, in Żytomierz, in the Volhynian Governorate of the Russian Empire, in what is now Zhytomyr in Ukraine. He was the offspring of the old szlachta family Żądło-Dąbrowski z Dąbrówki. He bore the Radwan coat of arms. His father was Wiktor Żądło-Dąbrowski, his mother was Zofia née Falkenhagen-Zaleska.

== Military career ==
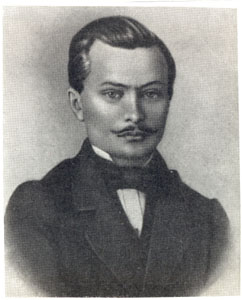
Dąbrowski in 1861

In 1845 at age 9, Dąbrowski joined the Imperial Russian Army, enrolling in the officer training corps at the Brest-Litovsk Fortress, where he spent 8 years. He graduated from the St. Petersburg Cadet Corps in 1855. He fought as a Russian officer against uprisings of the local mountain populations in the Caucasian War. In 1859 he enrolled in the General Staff Academy in St. Petersburg. There he was one of the leaders of the secret "Officers' Committee of the First Army". Members included several hundred Russian and Polish officers, cooperating with the revolutionary "Zemlya i Volya" (Land and Liberty) movement. He became involved in the preparation of the January Uprising, but was arrested on 14 August 1862, and exiled to Siberia for his participation in a plot against the Tsar, Alexander II. In 1865, he escaped and fled to France.

== In Paris ==
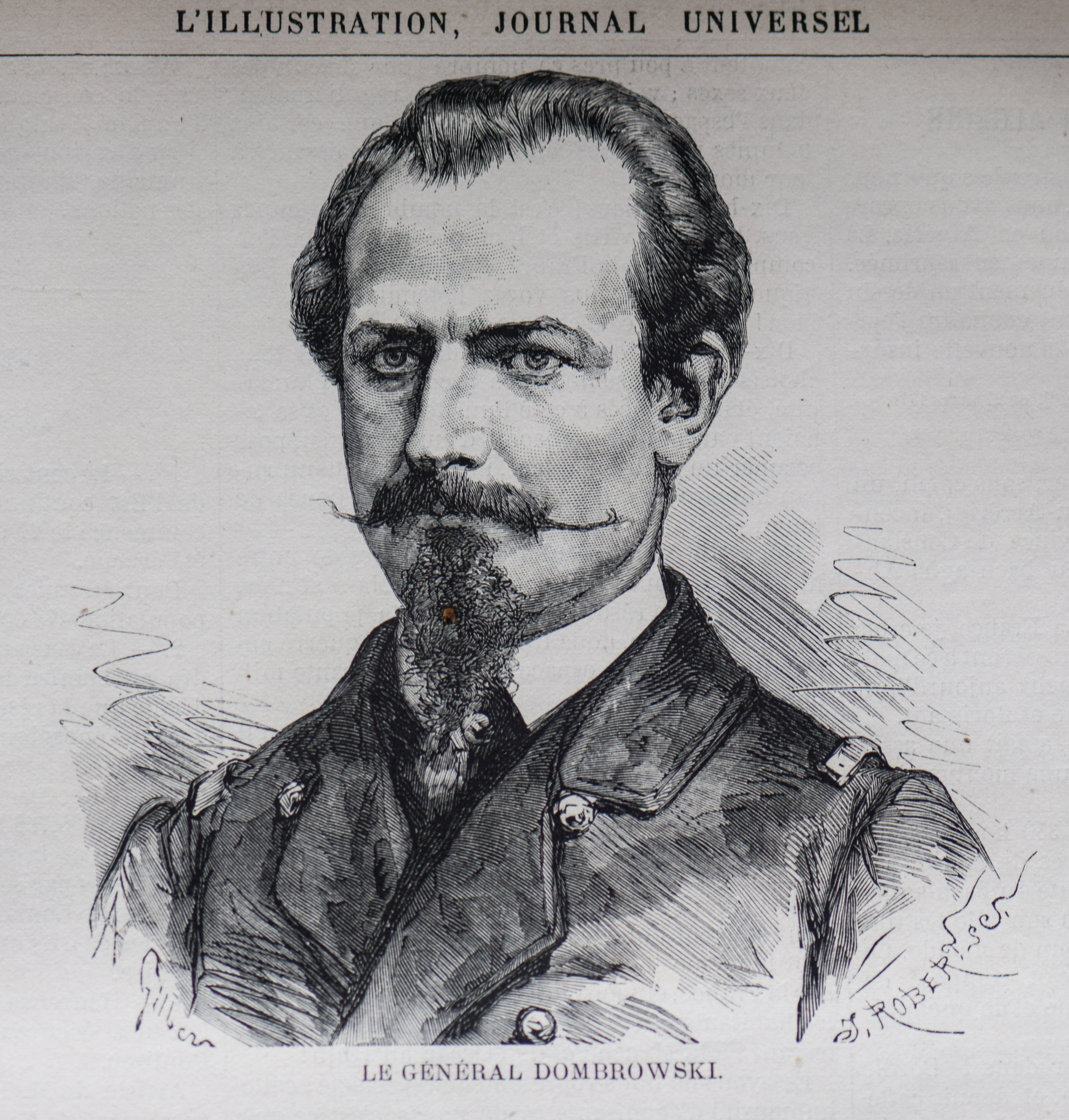
Engraving of Jarosław Dąbrowski in the magazine L'Illustration, 1871

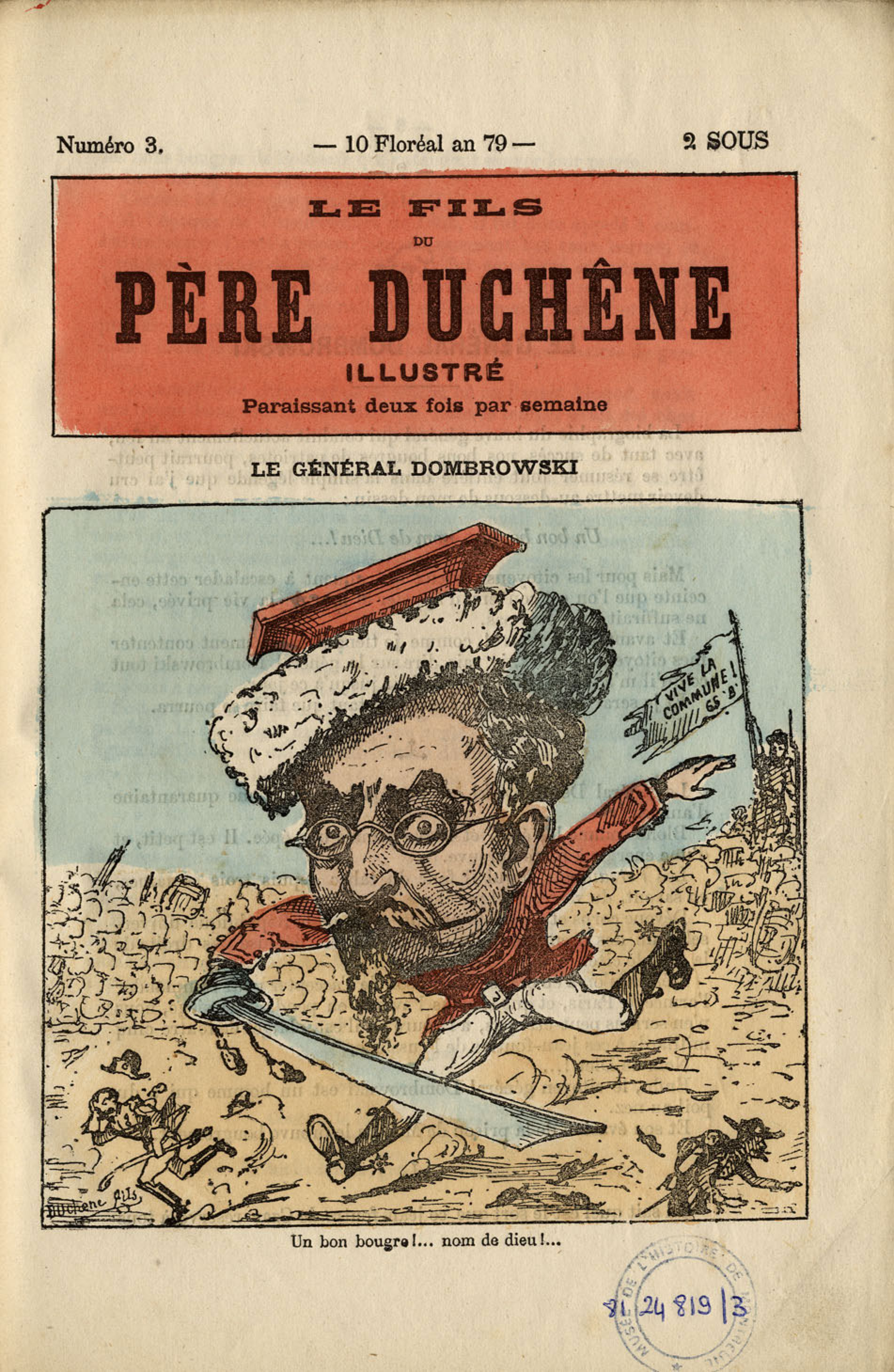
Dąbrowski caricatured in Le Père Duchesne Illustré: "Un bon bougre!... Nom de Dieu!..." ("A Good Guy!... For God's Sake!!..."); May 1871

In early March 1871, following months of siege by the Prussians and the capture of Napoleon III by the Prussian Army, a socialist-anarchist coalition called the Paris Commune seized power in Paris and declared itself independent of the French government. Dąbrowski was elected to the Council of the Paris Commune, using the spelling Jaroslav Dombrowski. As one of the few Commune soldiers with military experience, he was soon named Commander-in-Chief of the Commune forces.

On 21 May 1871, shortly after he was named commander, the French Army attacked and entered Paris. The first reaction of many of the National Guard was to find someone to blame, and Dąbrowski was the first to be accused. Rumors circulated he accepted a million francs to give up the city. He was deeply offended by the rumors. They stopped when he died two days later from wounds received on the barricades. His last reported words were, "Do they still say I was a traitor?" The Commune fell on 28 May 1871.

=== Misidentification with pianist Henri Dombrowski ===
A photographic portrait, taken before 1870, of Paris pianist Henri Dombrowski was falsely portrayed as depicting General Jarosław Dąbrowski by photographer Pierre Petit. Petit sold 200,000 copies of the photo. Henri Dombrowski demanded damages. The misidentification with pianist Henri Dombrowski can be seen in many monuments and portrayals of Jarosław Dąbrowski as a result of Petit's actions.

== Legacy ==
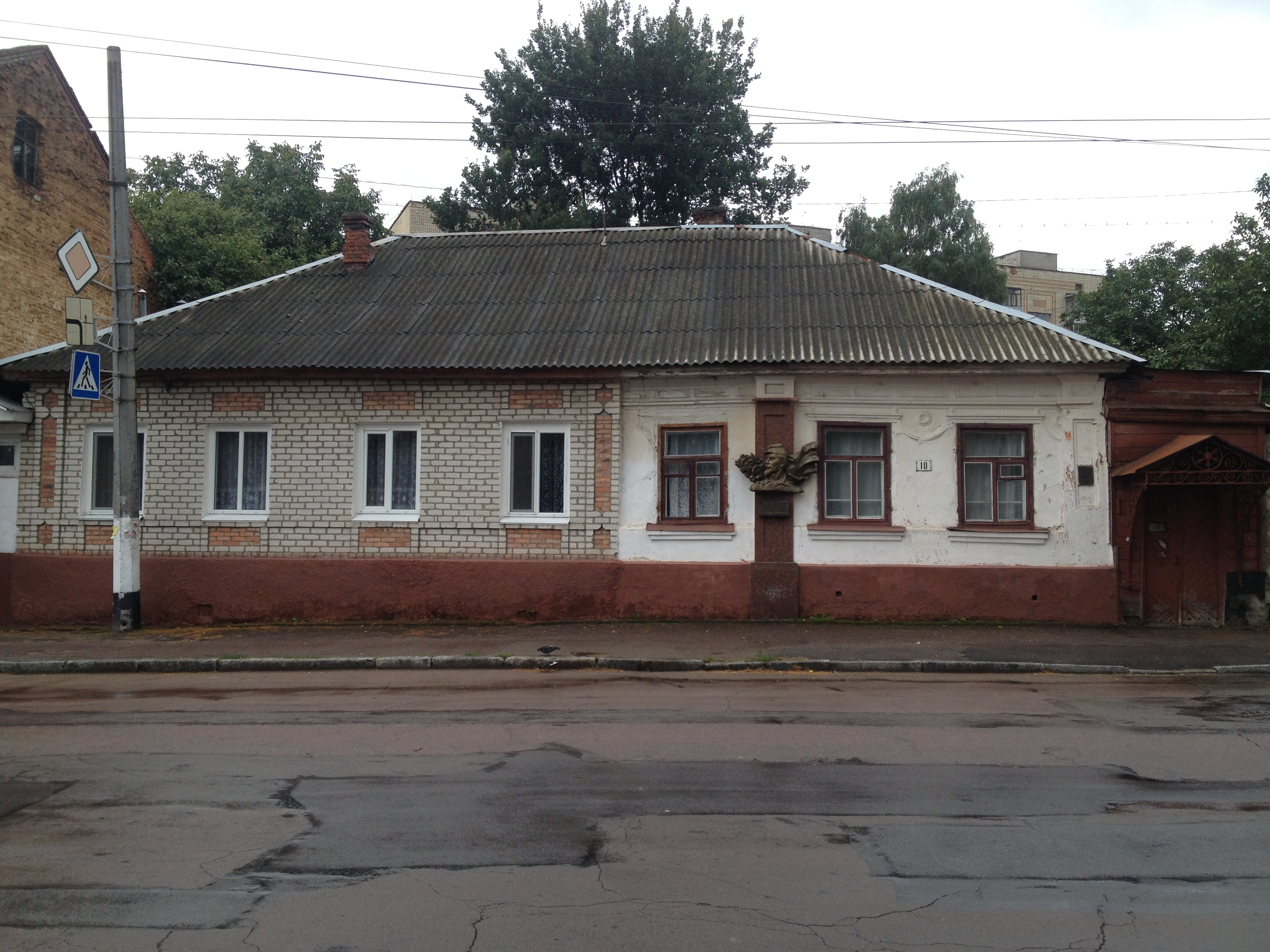
Zhytomyr house where Dąbrowski was born

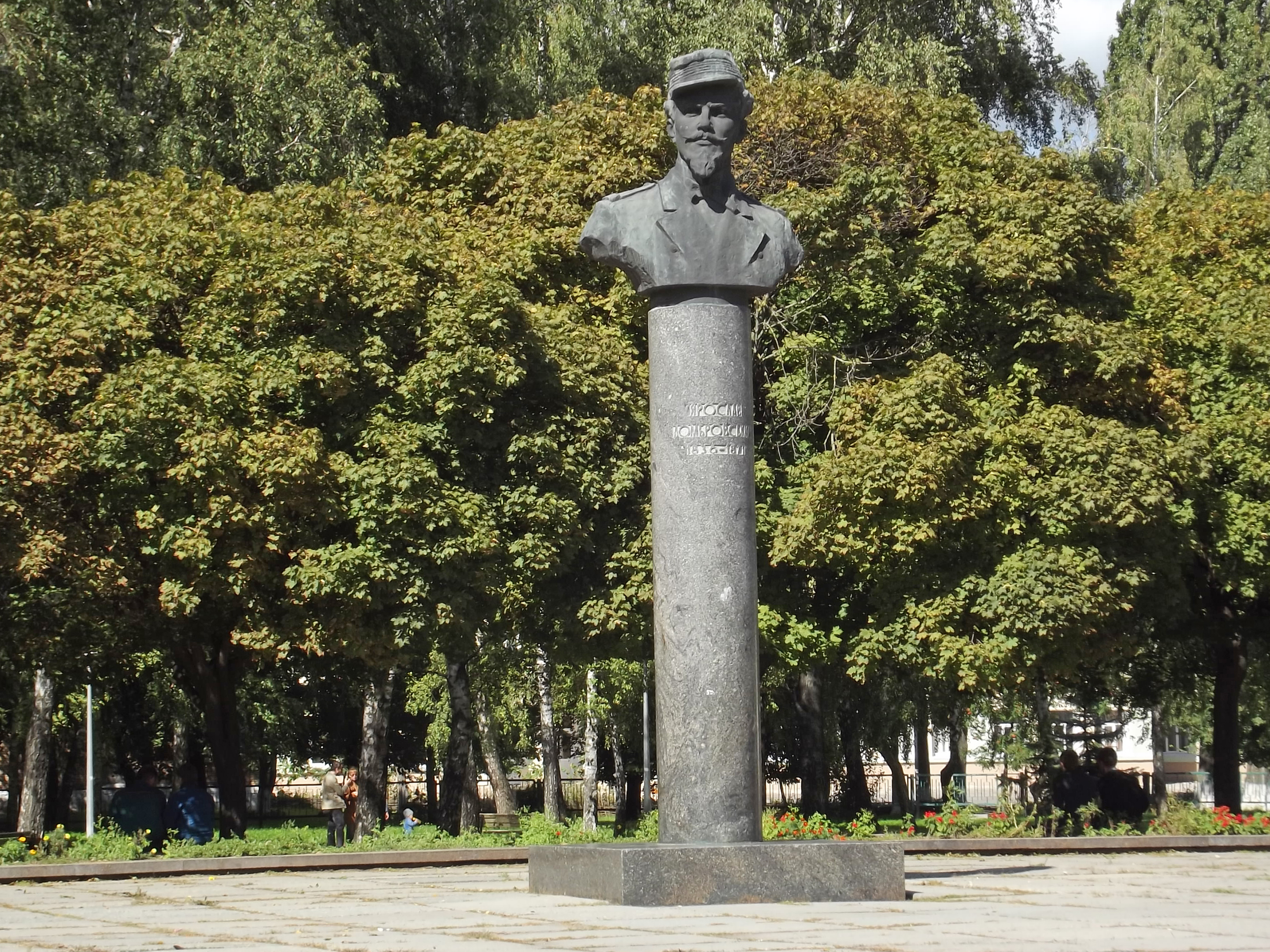
Monument dedicated to Dąbrowski in Zhytomyr

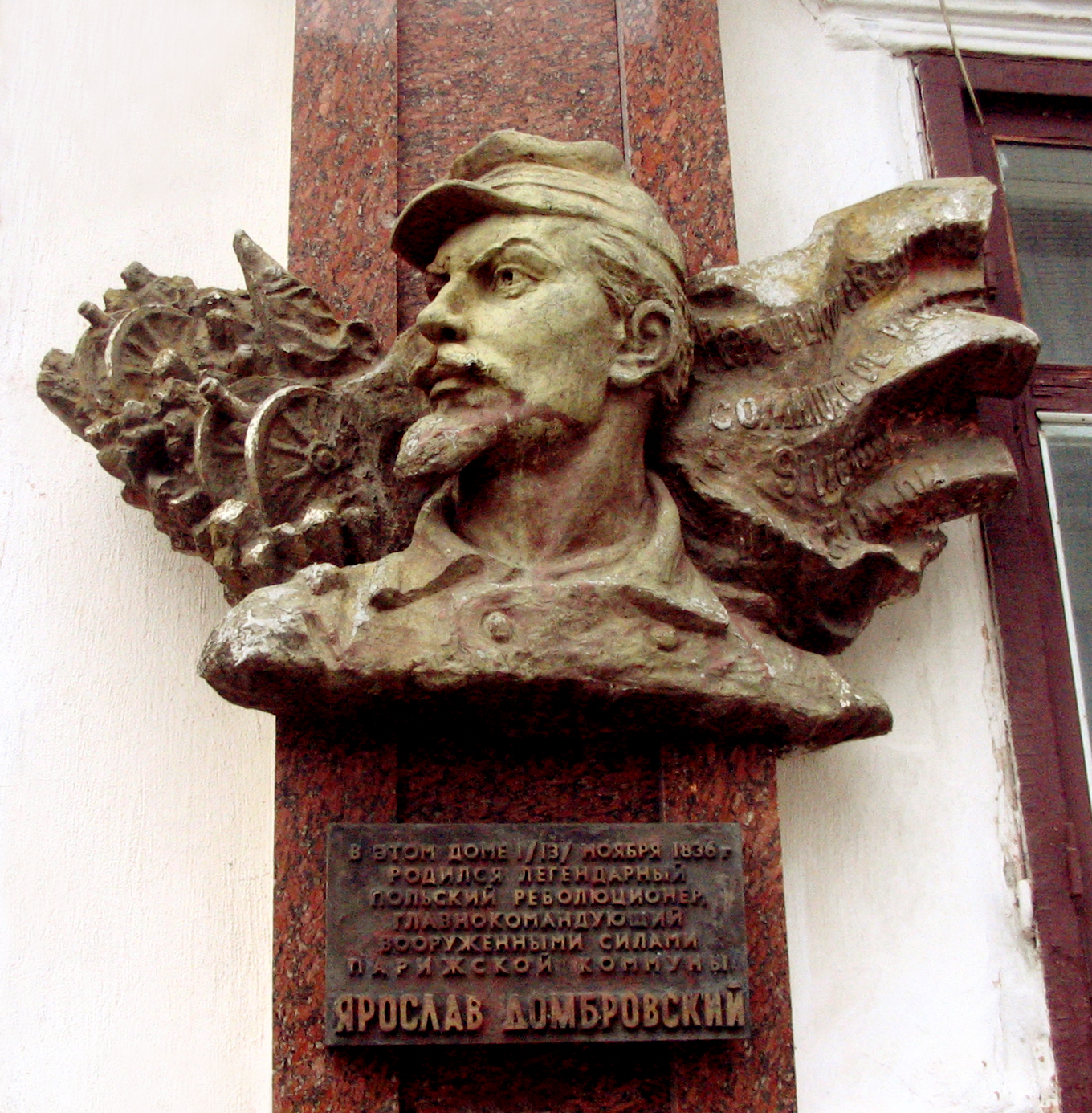
Memorial on the Zhytomyr house where Dąbrowski was born

Several schools and roads are named after him in Poland; among them most notable is the Military University of Technology in Warsaw. In the Spanish Civil War (1936–1939), the Dabrowski Battalion and various brigade-strength units (known in Polish as the Dąbrowszczacy) – were named in his honour. During the communist era Polish banknotes featured Dąbrowski on the 200 zl bill.

== See also ==
- Paris Commune
- Fire in the Minds of Men: Origins of the Revolutionary Faith
- James H. Billington
- List of Poles

== Bibliography ==
- Beer, Daniel (2017), THE HOUSE OF THE DEAD: SIBERIAN EXILE UNDER THE TSARS, New York: Alfred A. Knopf, Inc., ISBN 9780307958907.
- Billington, James H. (1980), FIRE IN THE MINDS OF MEN: ORIGINS OF THE REVOLUTIONARY FAITH, New York: Basic Books.
- Dufour, Sélim-François (7 April 1867), "CONCERTS ET AUDITIONS MUSICALES DE LA SEMAINE", Revue et gazette musicale de Paris (14), Paris, France: Brandus & Dufour: 109.
- Friedl, Peter (September 2010), "History in the Making", E-flux (18), New York City, New York county, NEW YORK, U.S.A..
- Lerski, Jerzy J. (1996), HISTORICAL DICTIONARY OF POLAND, 966–1945, Westport, Connecticut: Greenwood Press.
- Milza, Pierre (2009), L'année terrible: La Commune (mars–juin 1871), Paris: Perrin, ISBN 978-2-262-03073-5.
- Zdrada, Jerzy (1973), JAROSŁAW DĄBROWSKI, 1836–1871, Kraków: Wydawnictwo Literackie.
- Złotorzycka, Maria (1946) [1939], "Dąbrowski Jarosław", in Konopczyński, Władysław (ed.), POLSKI SŁOWNIK BIOGRAFICZNY: DĄBROWSKI JAN HENRYK – DUNIN PIOTR STANISŁAW, vol. V, Kraków: POLSKA AKADEMIA UMIEJĘTNOŚCI, pp. 8–10.
