= Dabrowski Battalion =

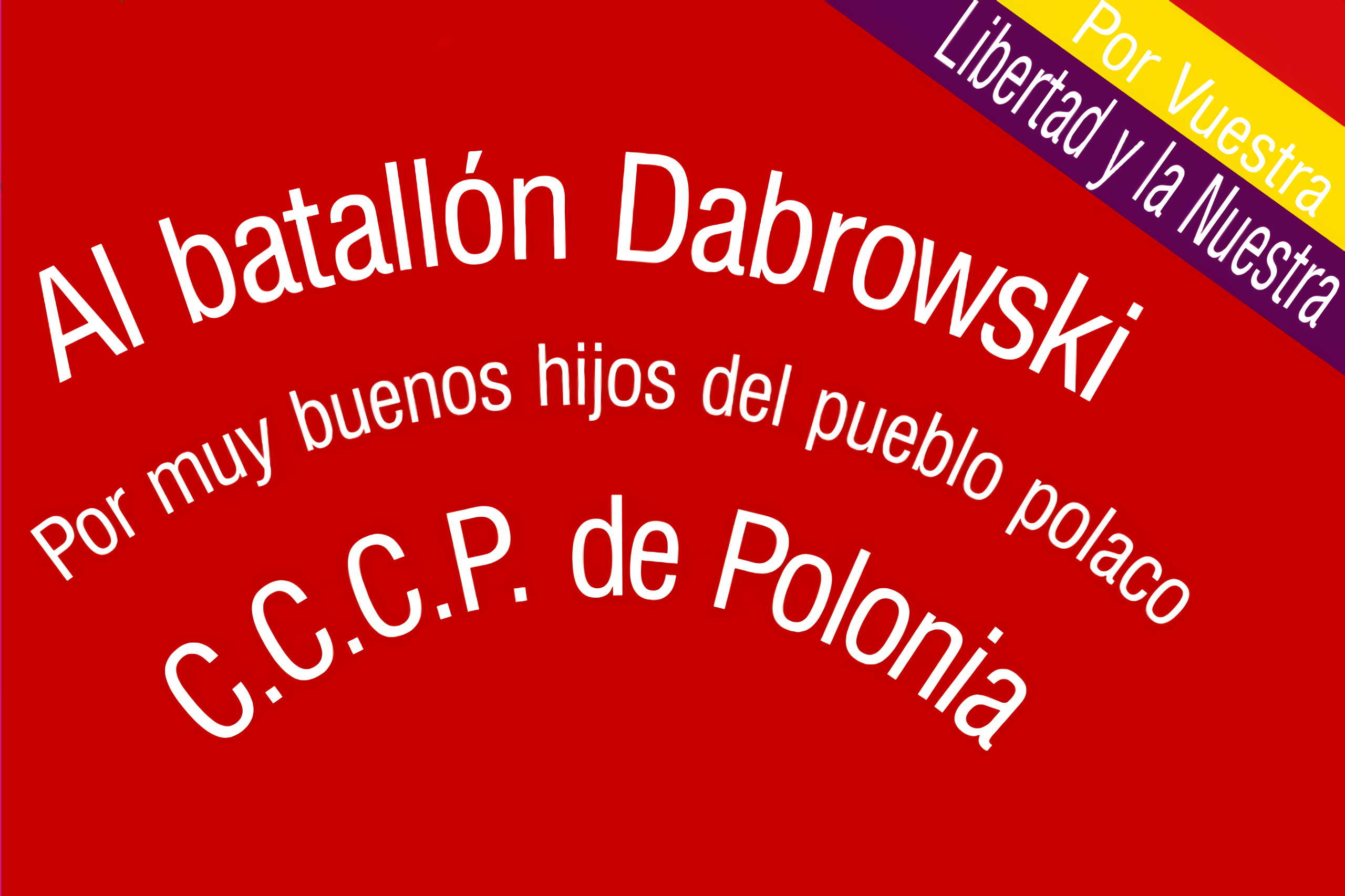
- One of the flags of the battalion
- Active: 14 October 1936–24 September 1938; 1 January 1939–9 January 1939
- Country: Poland
- Allegiance: Spanish Republic
- Branch: 11th Mobile Brigade (XI "Hans Beimler" International Brigade); XII International Brigade; 150th International Brigade; XIII International Brigade
- Type: Foreign volunteer Battalion
- Size: 600 men (November 1936)
- Nickname: Dąbrowszczacy
- Patron: Jarosław Dąbrowski
- Motto: For our freedom and yours
- Engagements: Spanish Civil War: Siege of Madrid; Battle of Jarama

Commanders
- Notable commanders: Józef Strzelczyk

The Dabrowski Battalion, also known as Dąbrowszczacy (Polish pronunciation: [dɔmbrɔfˈʂt͡ʂat͡sɨ]), was a battalion of the International Brigades in the Spanish Civil War. It was initially formed entirely of volunteers, "chiefly composed of Polish miners recently living and working in France and Belgium". Due to the relatively short travelling distances, these men were amongst the first to arrive in Spain. The battalion had a strong Polish flavour and even when, towards the end of the war, Poles were heavily outnumbered by Spanish troops, the officers and non-commissioned officers were still predominantly Polish. It also contained a significant nucleus of Red Army officers. It fought from 1936-1939.

The battalion was raised in Albacete (the headquarters depot of the International Brigades) in mid-October 1936.

== Soldiers ==
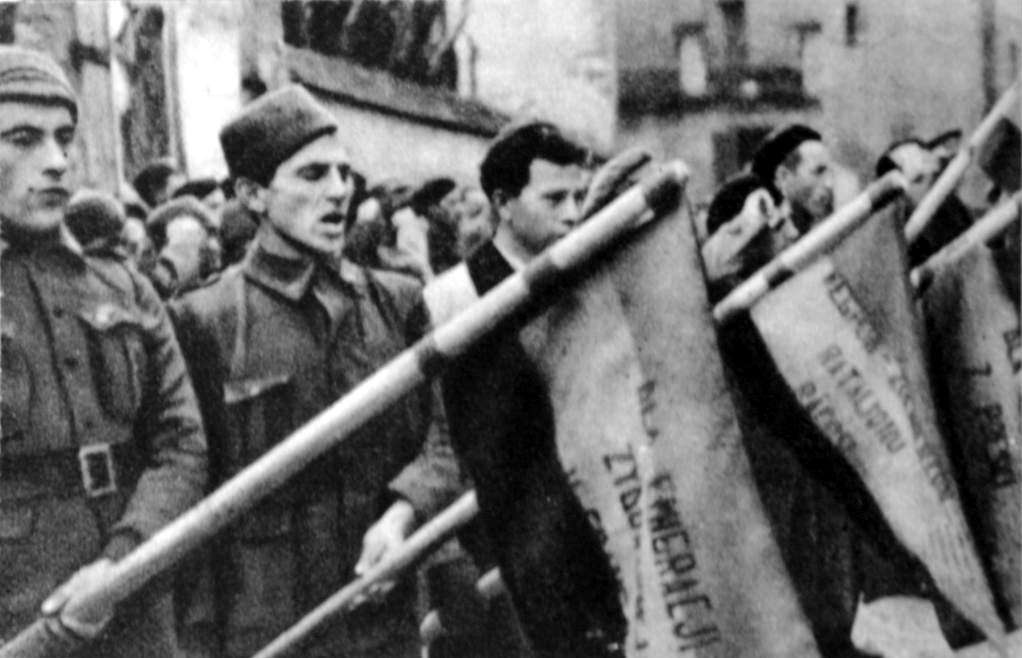
Soldiers of the Brigade.

About 5,000 Poles fought in the unit. The brigade was named after the 19th-century Polish general Jarosław Dąbrowski. The unit was formed as Dąbrowski's battalion in October 1936.

In June 1937 it was reorganised into the 150th Brigade, which was renamed to the 13th Dąbrowski's International Brigade in August. The brigade was demobilized in 1938 but volunteered back to service in 1939. On 9 January it crossed the French border and was finally dissolved; most of its soldiers were interned.

Most of the Dabrowski Battalion were Polish communists. For their communist orientation they were condemned by the Second Polish Republic, which cancelled the citizenship of many of them (in spite of the fact that Poland was the second-largest arms supplier to the Republic, just after the USSR). On the other hand, they were portrayed as heroes in the Polish People's Republic; many of them served in the Berling Army, Armia Ludowa and Gwardia Ludowa during the Second World War.

=== Commanders ===
- Stanisław Ulanowski (October – 21 November 1936)
- Antoni Kochanek (21 November 1936 – 2 January 1937)
- Józef Strzelczyk „Jan Barwiński” (16 April – 15 July 1937)
- Wacław Komar właśc. Mendel Kossoj (15 July 1937 – 13 February 1938)
- Franciszek Księżarczyk (13–16 February 1938)
- Antoni Pietrzak (16 February – 17 March 1938)
- José Martinez (17 March – 3 September 1938)
- Emiliano Chamon (3–24 September 1938)

== Operational history ==
=== Formation ===
This battalion was originally part of XI Brigada Movil ("11th Mobile Brigade") which was formed 14–17 October 1936. The volunteers were grouped by language into four battalions to make communication easier. On 22 October 1936, the IX Brigada Movil was renamed the XI International Brigade (also known as the 13th Hans Beimler Brigade), with General "Kléber" (Manfred Stern) commanding. The four component battalions were renamed as follows:

- 1st Bn Franco-Belge became Commune de Paris Battalion.
- 2nd Bn Austro-German became Edgar André Battalion
- 3rd Bn Italo-Espanol became Garibaldi Battalion
- 4th Bn Polish-Balkan became Jarosław Dąbrowski Battalion, commanded by Major Tadeusz Oppman.
- An entirely Spanish volunteer unit - the Asturias-Heredia Battalion - was added after the Battle of Madrid to bring the brigade up to strength.

=== Siege of Madrid ===
By early November, the Siege of Madrid was underway and the need for men was great. The 600-man strong Dabrowski Battalion, along with the rest of XI International Brigade were the first units of the International Brigades to go into action.

The first intervention of the International Brigades, in the siege of Madrid on 8 November 1936, would become legendary. The first Brigade to arrive was the XI with 1,700 men, mainly Germans, French, Belgians and Poles, followed by the XII four days later with another 1,550. The CNT press in the capital reported their arrival in the early hours of the morning 'in silent and damp streets: Marching firmly, their footsteps echoing on the cobblestones... singing revolutionary songs in French, German, Italian... The people ran out to cheer them,' convinced these strangely uniformed men had been sent by Russia and 'if their powerful ally Russia...intervened on their side anything was possible...the cry rang out from many a balcony--Long live the Russians !' After two days of combat half the XI were dead. ***CITATION***

The Dabrowski Battalion was in the thick of the action - at the University City and Casa de Campo - losing two thirds of its men. It was subsequently reinforced by new volunteers arriving from Albacete and by Spanish volunteers, and reorganised into three Polish/Balkan companies and one Spanish company.

=== Battle of Jarama ===
The Dąbrowski Battalion, as part of the XII brigade, was sent to Jarama, a few kilometres from Madrid, to block a Nationalist attack. The Nationalist aim was to take the main Madrid to Valencia highway and thus cut Madrid off from Andalusia, where the Republican government was based. The fighting was ferocious with all five International Brigades engaged along a continuous front.

At Jarama, the battalion was commanded by Józef Strzelczyk. During the course of the battle, the battalion lost a third of their effectives (6–27 February 1937).

== Order of battle ==
The Dabrowski Battalion served as part of several brigades. As its numbers were reduced by casualties, it absorbed various other understrength international battalions, supplemented by Spanish conscript companies, but it never again reached full strength. It was disbanded in September 1938.

Date joined	Date left	Brigade		Comment
26 Oct 1936	28 Nov 1936	XI International Brigade	11th Hans Beimler Brigade	
28 Nov 1936	30 Apr 1937	XII International Brigade	12th Garibaldi Brigade	
1 May 1937	4 Aug 1937	150th International Brigade		
4 Aug 1937	23 Sep 1938	XIII International Brigade	13th Dabrowski Brigade	Disbanded

== See also ==
- Polish volunteers in the Spanish Civil War
- Bolesław Mołojec

== Notes and references ==
- Hugh Thomas, The Spanish Civil War
