= Huesca Offensive =

Battle of the Spanish Civil War

- Part of the Spanish Civil War
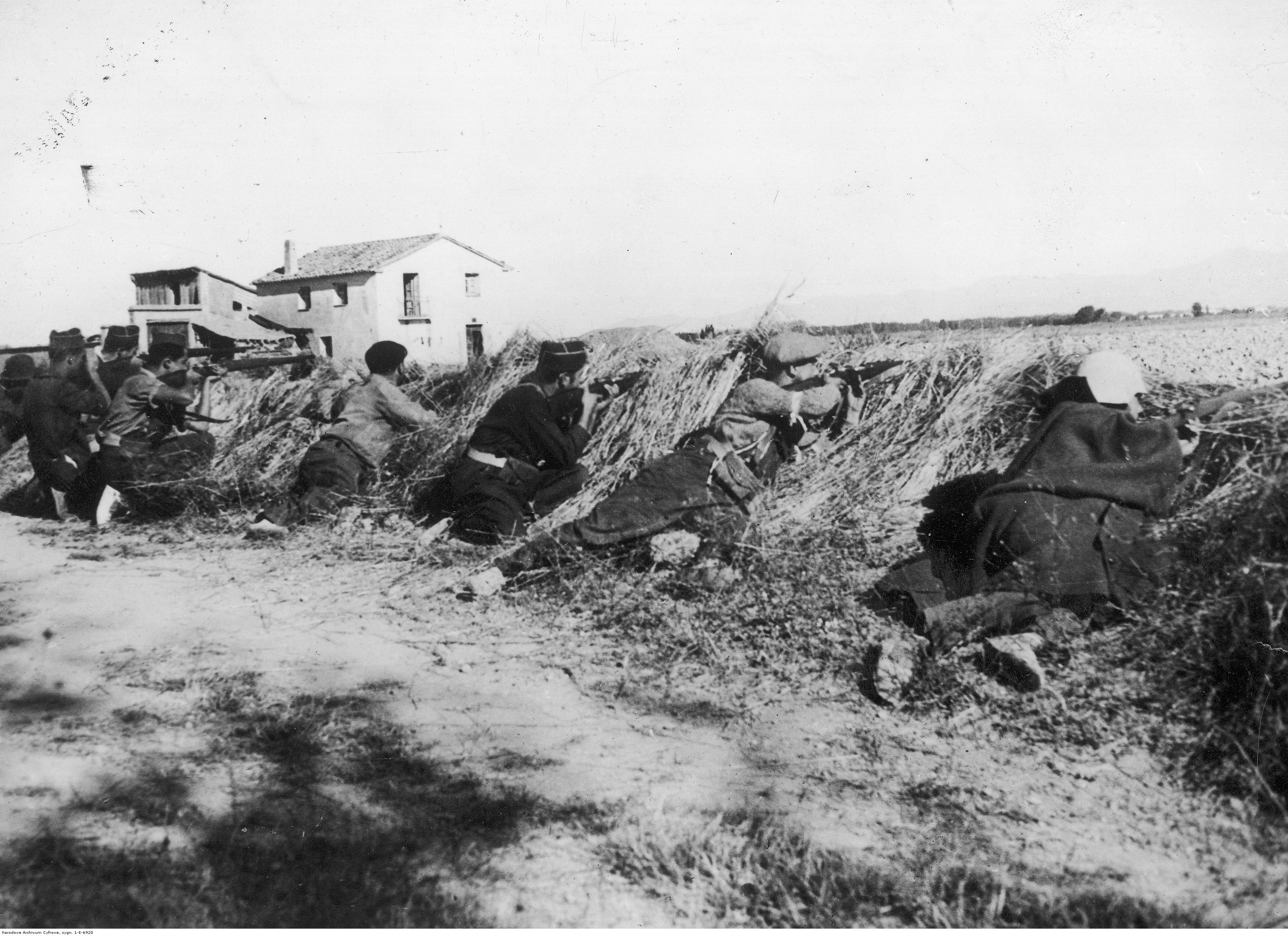
- Republican forces on the outskirts of Huesca, September 1936
Date	12 June – 19 June 1937
Location	Near Huesca, Huesca province, Spain
Result	Nationalist victory

Belligerents
Spanish Republic; International Brigades	Nationalist Spain

Commanders and leaders
(Second Spanish Republic) Sebastián Pozas; Máté Zalka †	

Units involved
Army of the East: Rakosi Battalion	

Strength

Casualties and losses
9,000 casualties	

The Huesca Offensive was an operation carried out during the Spanish Civil War by the Republican Army in June 1937 in order to take the Aragonese city of Huesca, which since the start of the war in July 1936 had been under the control of the Nationalist forces.

== Background ==
In April 1937, the Nationalists started an offensive against the Republican-held Biscay Province, and by the end of May, the Navarrese troops had reached the eastern side of Bilbao's defenses. The Republican government then decided to launch two diversionary offensives on the Aragon and Madrid fronts in order to divert Nationalist troops.

== The Offensive ==
The Republican government decided to launch an attack against the Nationalist held city of Huesca. After the May Days, the Republican forces in the Aragon front had been reorganized and the Republican government established a new Army of the East. This force, under the command of General Pozas, was reinforced with the XII International Brigade, led by General Pavol Lukacs (an alias for Máté Zalka, the Brigade's Commander), and four brigades from the central front. The Republican forces outnumbered the Nationalist forces besieged in Huesca, but the Nationalist troops were well entrenched and the Republican troops had little artillery and armoured support.

The attack against Huesca started on 12 June, led by Lukács who also commanded the 45th Division of the Spanish Republican Army. The troops attacking across open ground were decimated by the machine-gun and artillery fire of the Nationalists. Furthermore, the same day, Lukács/Zalka was hit by a Nationalist shell and died. The offensive saw the Rakosi Battalion's first action (with 288 men). The battalion became trapped by machine-gun fire and lost a quarter of its men. Their commander, Ákos Hevesi, and political commissar, Imre Tarr, were both killed as they led from the front. On 16 June the Republican troops attacked the villages of Alerre and Chimillas but the assault was repelled by the Nationalist troops. On 19 June, the Nationalists entered Bilbao and the offensive was called off, after other two days of failed Republican assaults.

== Aftermath ==
The Republican troops had heavy casualties (according to Beevor, 9,000), mainly anarchist and POUM members. The failed offensive after the recent May Days in Barcelona, increased the defeatism and the suspicions among the Republican troops in Aragon.

== See also ==
- List of Spanish Republican military equipment of the Spanish Civil War
- List of Spanish Nationalist military equipment of the Spanish Civil War

== Bibliography ==
- Beevor, Antony. The Battle for Spain. The Spanish Civil War 1936–1939. Penguin Books. London. 2006. ISBN 0-14-303765-X
- Thomas, Hugh. The Spanish Civil War. Penguin Books. London. 2001. ISBN 978-0-14-101161-5
