= List of magazines in Belarus =

Publications in Belarus, including magazines, mostly have a pro-Russian perspective and are subject to strict censorship.

In the period between 2010 and 2015 the number of magazines published in the Belarusian language declined by 30%. In addition, there was a 35% decrease in their circulation during the same period. The number of magazines in the country was 135 in 2015. It was reported to be 571 in 2023.

The following is an incomplete list of current and defunct magazines published in Belarus.

== A ==
- ARCHE Pachatak

== N ==
- Nasha Historiya

== V ==
- Vozhyk
