= Sykhivskyi District =

Coordinates: 49.7953°N 24.0497°E

Sykhivskyi District Сихівський район
- Urban district in Lviv
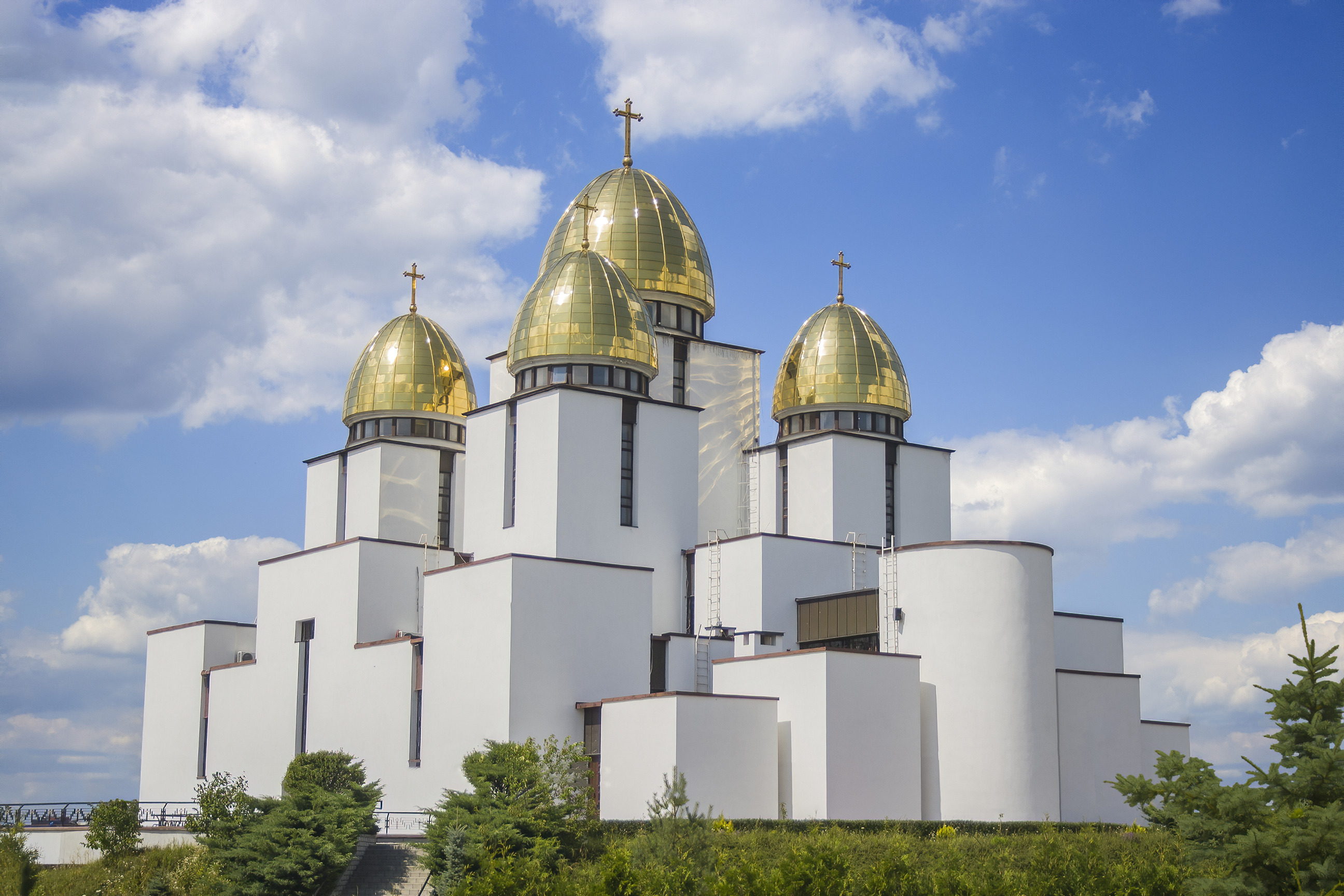
- Church of the Nativity of the Virgin Mary in Sykhiv

- Map of Lviv and its raions with Sykhiv highlighted in red.
- Country: Ukraine
- Oblast: Lviv Oblast

Population
  - Total: 151,371
- Time zone: EET

Sykhivskyi District (Ukrainian: Сихівський район) is an urban district of Lviv, named after an eponymous historical settlement. The district covers the southeastern part of the city. It is considered to be one of the most attractive sleeping areas of Lviv with a developed infrastructure.

== History ==
Sykhivskyi District was officially created in 2000 which makes it the newest district of Lviv. It contains such neighborhoods as Novyi Lviv, Persenkivka, Kozelnyky, and Sykhiv.

== Historical areas ==
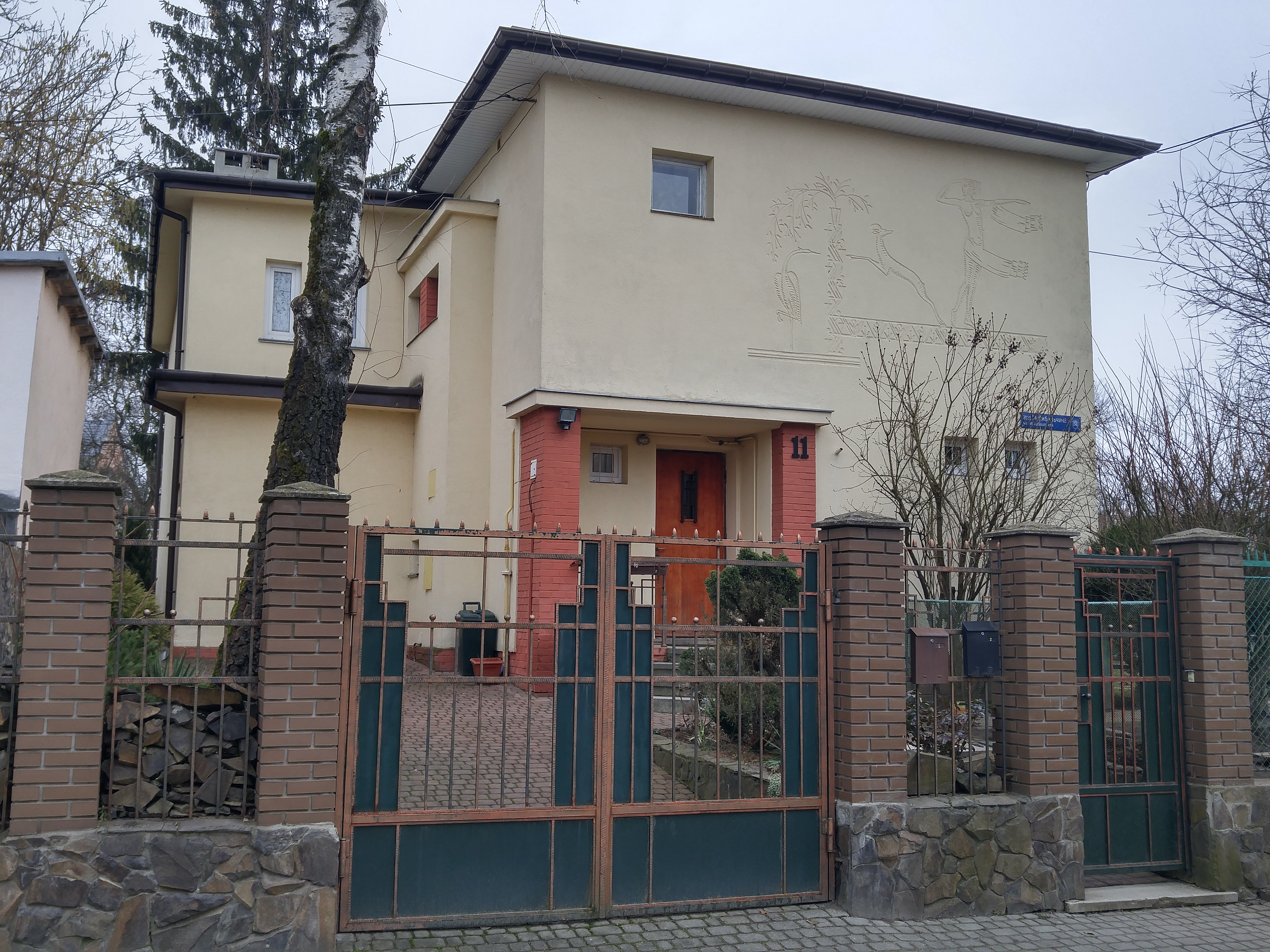
A 1932 villa with sgraffito in Novyi Lviv

=== Novyi Lviv ===
Novyi Lviv (New Lviv) is a city quarter in Sykhivskyi District, which was planned as a garden city on the site of the earlier folwark of Krasuchyn. The area is separated from downtown Lviv by Zalizna Voda park, which became a popular recreation site during the 1830s. The initial construction started in 1910, but was halted due to World War I, with only a few houses being finished. In the 1920s a villa complex known as Vlasna Strikha ("Own roof") was constructed in the western part of the area to house officials and members of the middle class. In the late 1920s and early 1930s a number of functionalist residential buildings were added, and during the 1930s villas following uniform designs appeared in the district, some including elements of art deco style. In 1933 a still extant water tower was built to provide water supplies to the quarter. During the Soviet era Novyi Lviv was built up with lowrise residential buildings and khrushchyovkas. In the 2010s a number of highrise structures appeared in the area.

=== Persenkivka ===
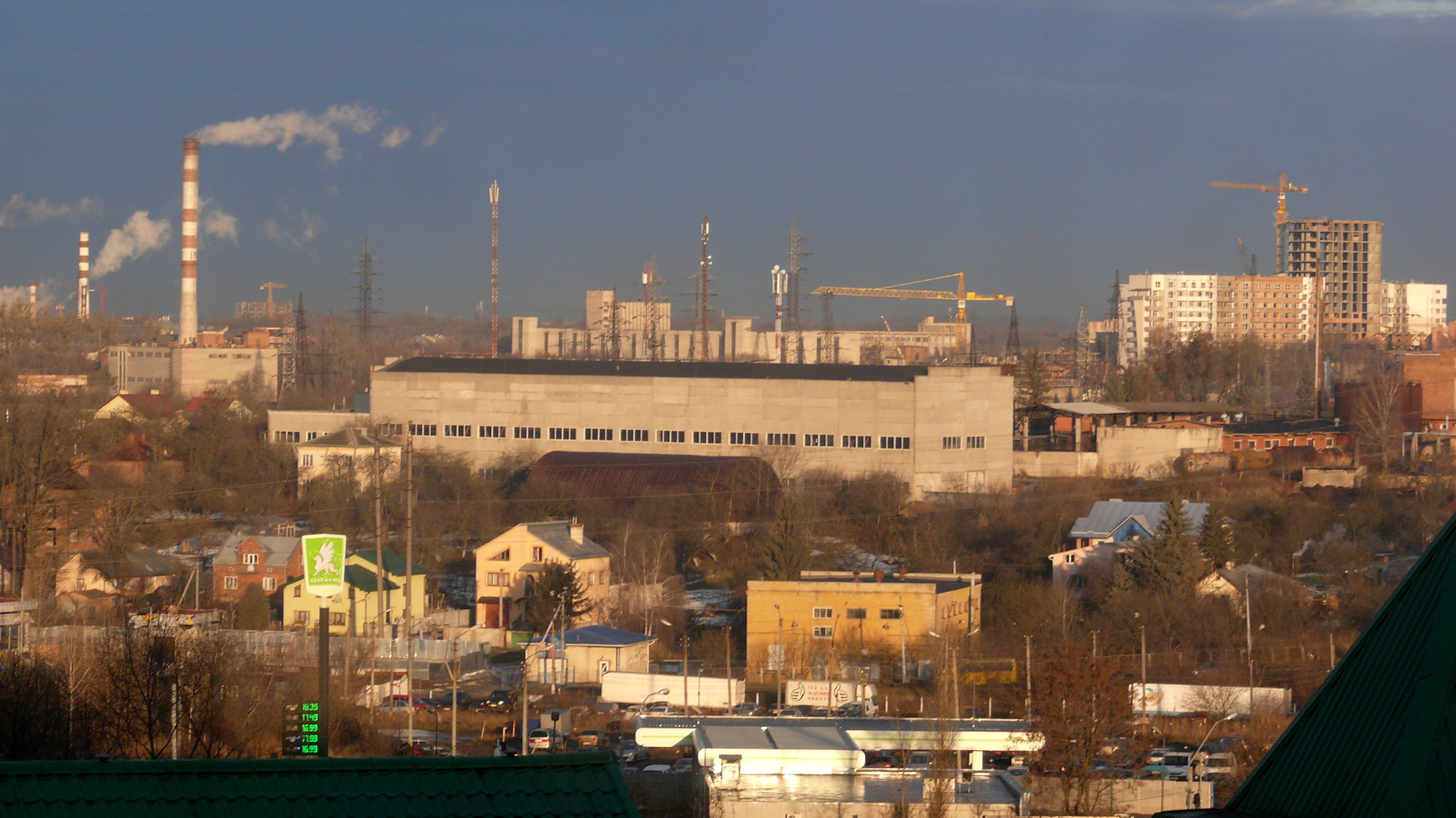
A view of Persenkivka

In 1907-1908 a power plant was established in the area of Persenkivka to the south of Novyi Lviv. An industrial area soon formed in the vicinity. In 1921 a railway line connected Persenkivka's railway station with the grounds of the Eastern Trade Fair in today's Stryi Park. After the bankruptcy of many enterprises during the 1990s, their grounds were used for residential construction or as office spaces.

In the early 1930s the construction of a Carmelite monastery started in the neighbourhood, however due to the beginning of World War II it was never finished. After the expulsion of the monks in 1946, the building functioned as a shop and a service station, and later became a property of Lviv Bus Factory. In 2017 the structure was granted the status of an architectural monument.

=== Sykhiv ===
The suburban village of Sykhiv was first mentioned in 1409 when it was bought by Piotr Włodkowic from its previous owners Ivan Rusyn and his wife Oksana for 50 kopas of Ruthenian Groschen. In 1525 the village was awarded Magdeburg rights by King Sigismund I.

Until 1673 Sykhiv functioned as a single folwark. In that year it was divided into 12 parts, each belonging to a consul of Lviv's city council. In 1774 the village of Sykhiv consisted of 46 homesteads and belonged to a Greek Catholic parish.

During the Polish-Ukrainian War, on 27 December 1918, the village was taken by forces of the Ukrainian Galician Army.

The northern part of the district was developed mostly during the 1920s and 1930s when Lviv belonged to Poland. During the German occupation in 1942 Sykhiv was administratively subordinated to Lviv. However, after coming under Soviet control, the village once again became part of Pustomyty Raion. It was finally attached to Lviv once again on 13 June 1952.

The southeastern (the core of the raion) and western parts were developed in the 1980s and 1990s by Ukrainian Soviet government. Construction of the first part of a new residential district commenced in 1979, with first buildings being settled in 1981. In 1986 a cinema named after Oleksandr Dovzhenko was opened in the area.

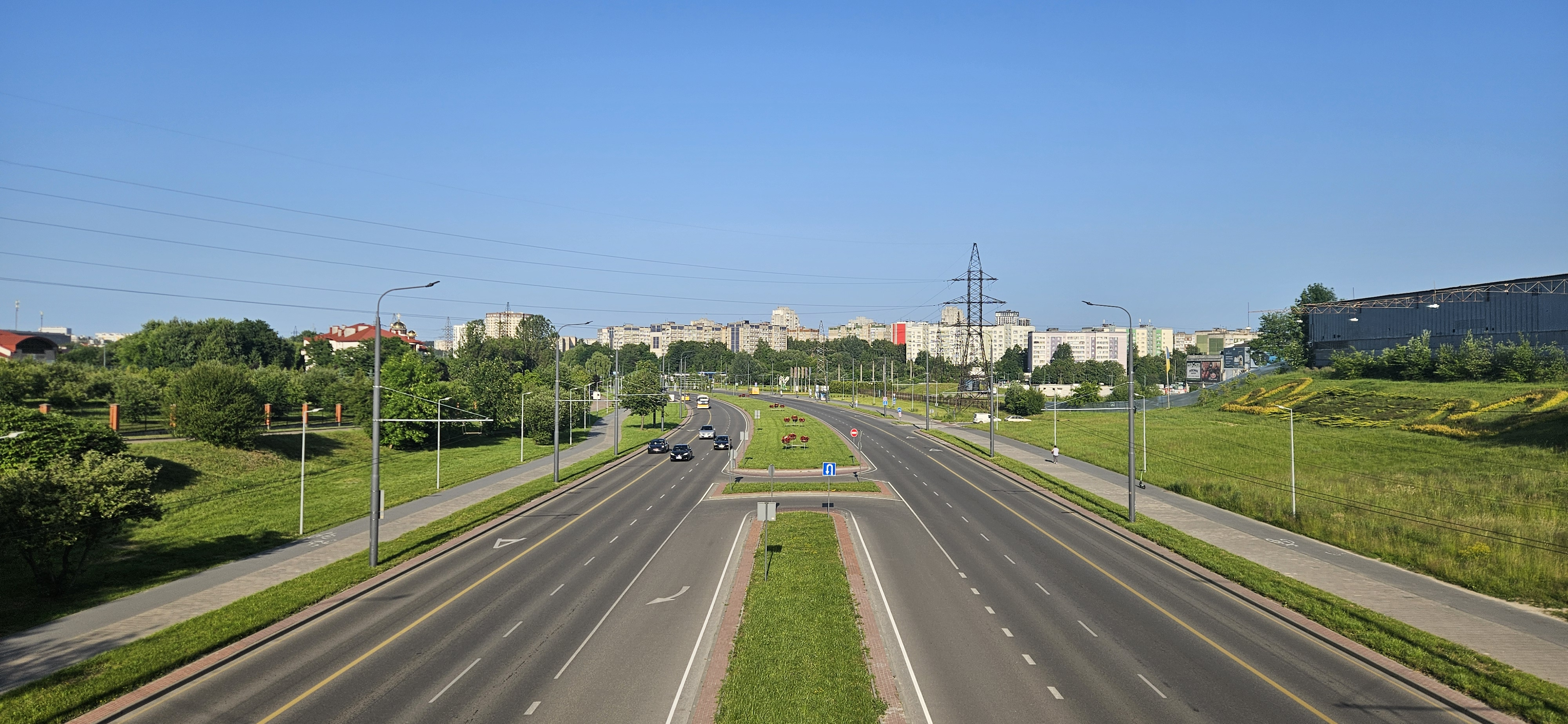
A skyline of Sykhiv from John Paul II Avenue

In 1994 a trade centre, popularly known as "Santa Barbara" due to its characteristic arcade, was opened in Sykhiv, giving its nickname to the nearby part of the district.

On 25 June 2001, during his visit to Ukraine, Pope John Paul II served a liturgy for the youth in front of the Cathedral of the Nativity of Mother of God in Sykhiv, which had been constructed between 1995 and 2000 according to a project by Canadian architect Radoslav Zhuk. The mass was attended by 500,000 people. In 2002 a monument to the pontiff was installed in front of the church, and five years later a park named in his honour was established nearby. In 2021 one of the streets of Sykhiv was renamed after John Paul II.

In May 2022 modular housing for 380 families was opened in Sykhiv microdistrict in order to house internally displaced persons fleeing the Russian invasion of Ukraine.

== Transport ==
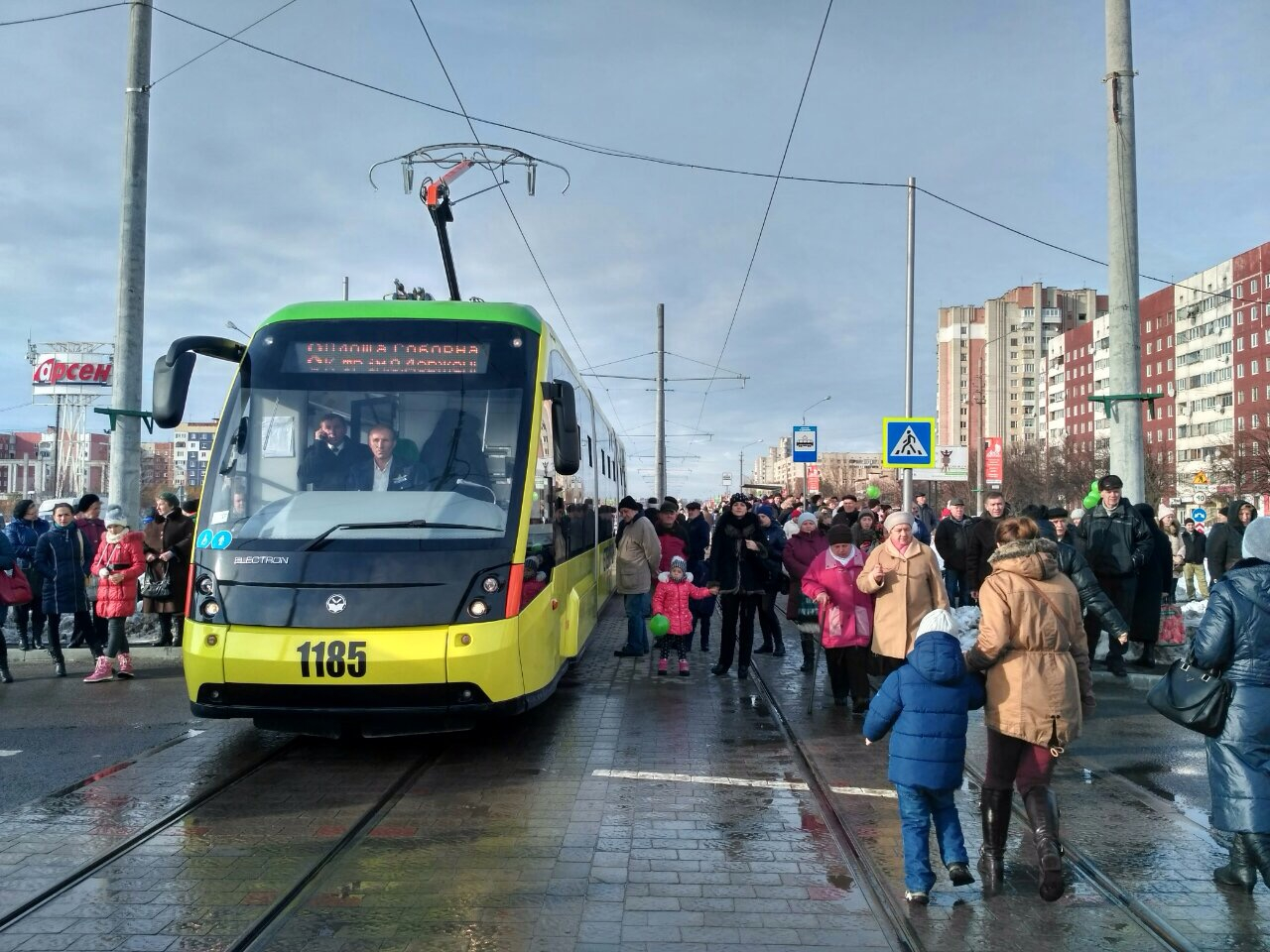
Sykhiv tram

In 1865 an eponymous railway station was established near Sykhiv as part of the Lviv-Chernivtsi line. In 1957 Novyi Lviv was connected to the rest of the city with a trolleybus line, which functioned until 2009. Another trolleybus line connected Sykhiv railway station with the city of Lviv in 1970. The Sykhiv residential district itself was served by bus until 1997, when a trolleybus line was established, followed by an extension in 2011. In 2004 a viaduct to Sykhiv was completed. Another trolleybus line opened in 2020.

Between 2014 and 2016 a tram line was constructed, connecting Sykhiv with downtown Lviv and the main railway station. The project, originally planned during the 1970s, was financed by the European Bank of Reconstruction and Development.

== Points of interest ==
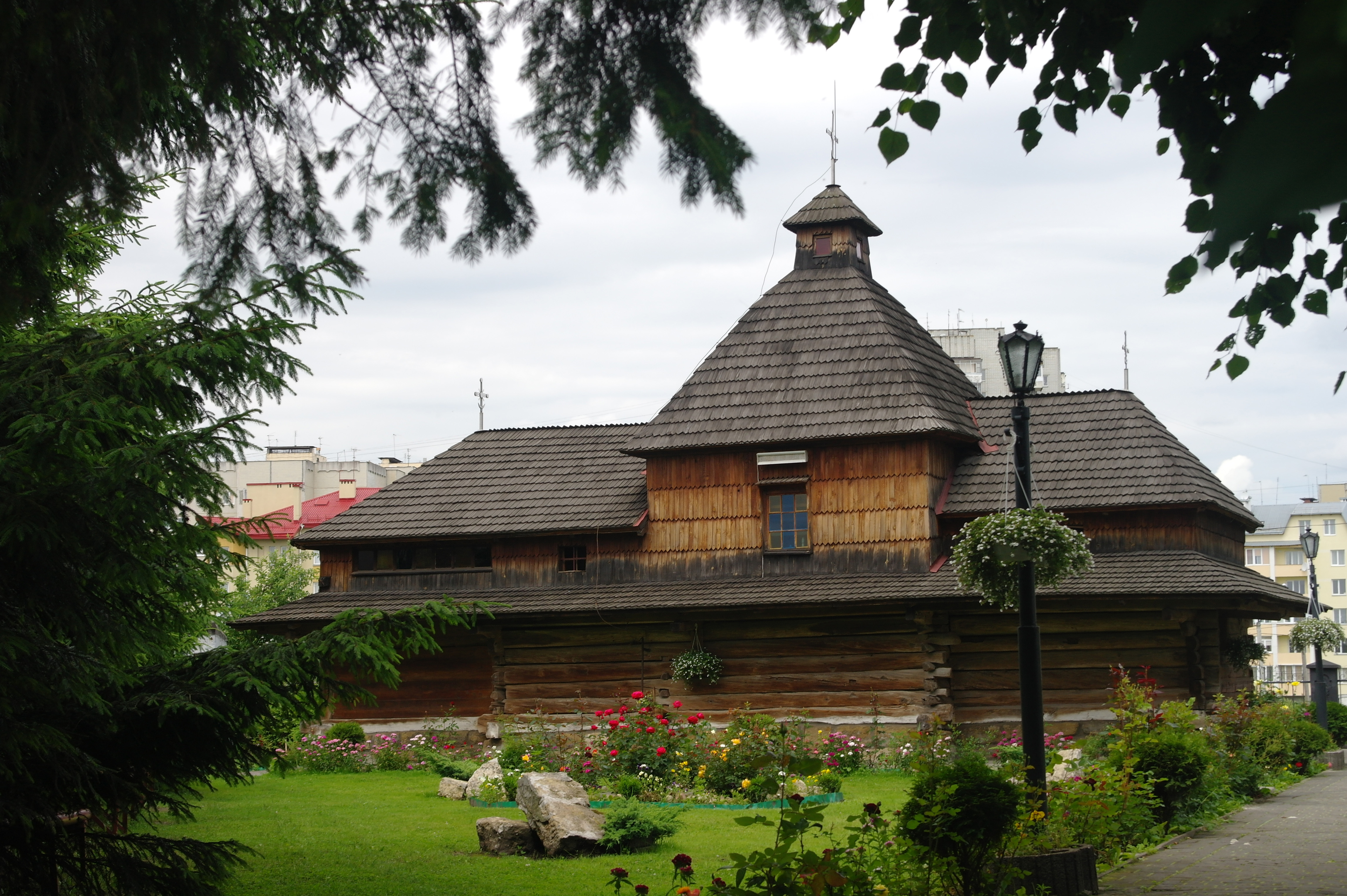
Holy Trinity Church in Sykhiv

The Arena Lviv stadium and Lviv Bus Factory are located in Sykhivskyi District.

The 17th-century wooden church of Holy Trinity, with frescoes dating from 1683, is located in Sykhiv. Transferred to the Lviv Art Gallery in 1974, the church was planned for relocation to Shevchenkivskyi Hai museum, but in 1989–1990 the Greek Catholic community retained its ownership over the building and later restored it.

In 1982 a monument to Yuri Velykanovych, a member of the Communist Party of Western Ukraine and participant of the Spanish Civil War, was opened in Zalizna Voda park. In 2017 it was removed by members of the C14 right-wing organization.

== See also ==
- Urban districts of Ukraine
