= Savyolovsky District =

Savyolovsky District Савёловский район (Russian)
- District
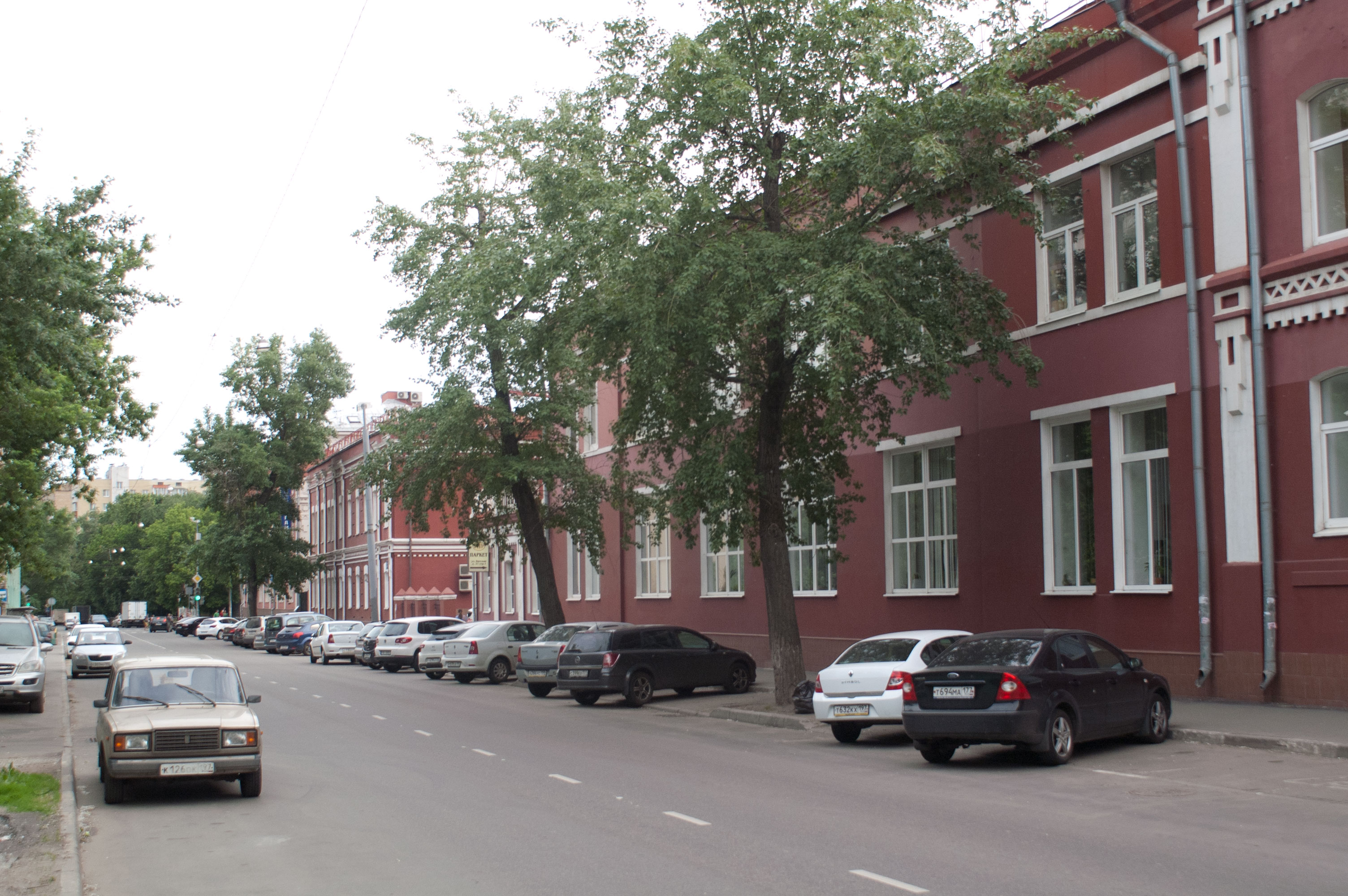
- Vyatskaya Street, Savyolovsky District

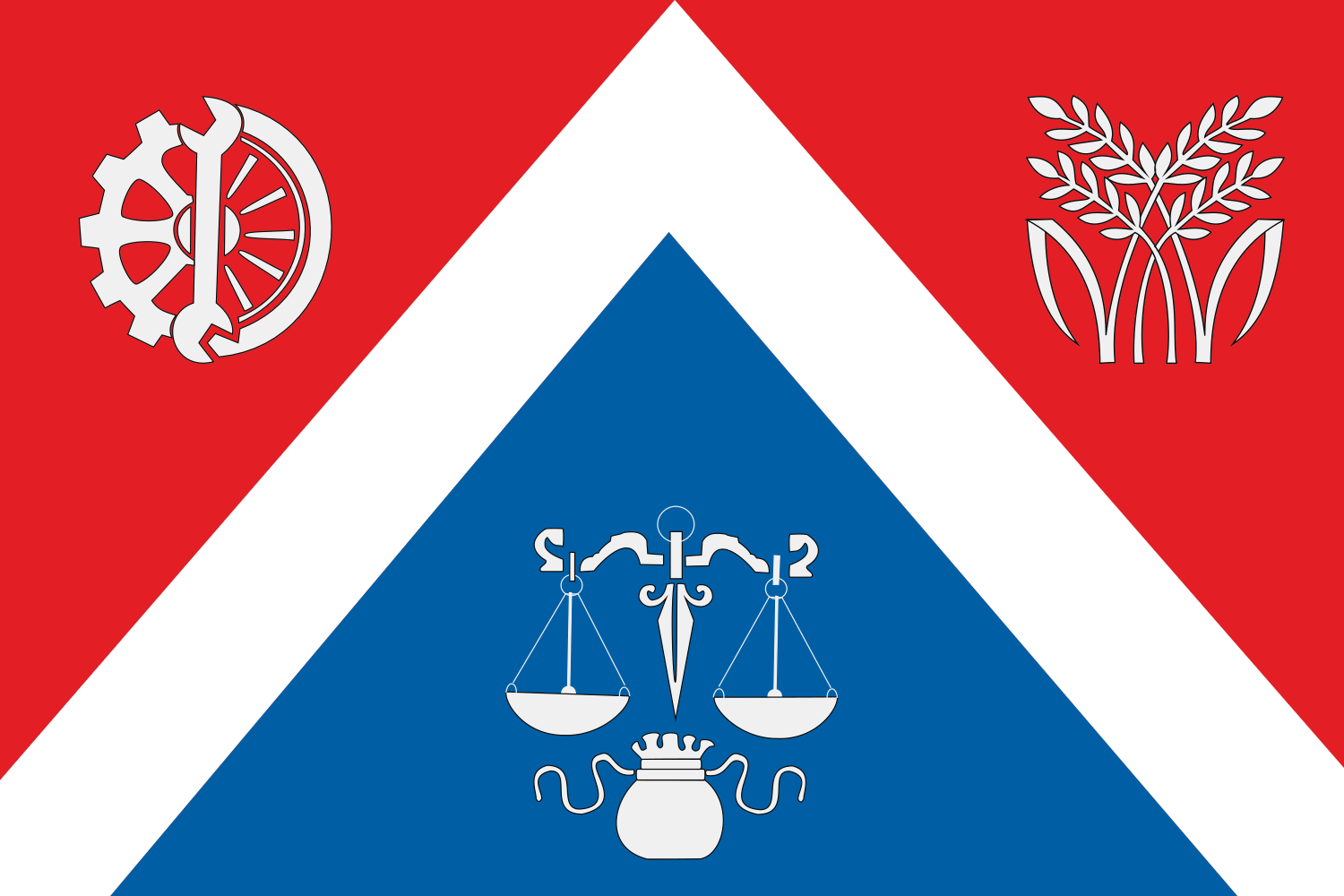
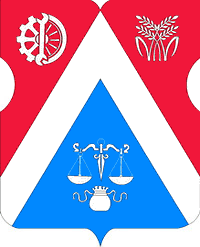
- Flag Coat of arms
- Location of Savyolovsky District on the map of Moscow
- Coordinates: 55°48′37″N 37°33′45″E
- Country: Russia
- Federal subject: Moscow

Area
  - Total: 2.7 km^{2} (1.0 sq mi)
- Time zone: UTC+
- OKTMO ID: 45344000
- Website: https://savelovskiy.mos.ru/

Savyolovsky District (Russian: Савёловский райо́н) is an administrative district (raion) of Northern Administrative Okrug, and one of the 125 raions of Moscow, Russia. The area of the district is 2.7 square kilometers (1.0 sq mi).

== Industry and Economy ==
- Freedom cosmetics and toilet soap factory. Founded in 1843. The factory building was constructed in 1846 and belonged to the trading house "Partnership Ralle and Co.", which was a supplier to the Russian imperial court. Currently, a connecting railway branch from the Grazhdanskaya station of the Riga Railway approaches the enterprise.
- Vympel sewing factory, closed. It was established in 1914, when a military uniform workshop at Butyrskaya transit prison began manufacturing greatcoats and uniforms. The workshop switched to producing civilian products in 1918.
- Butyrsky Market.
- Prague Cinema.
- Commercial Bank "Bank BFT".
- JSC Music Instrument Salon "Akord".
- Shopping center "Savelovsky" was founded by businessman Mikhail Dvornikov in 1998 as a market on the site of the former machine-tool manufacturing plant.

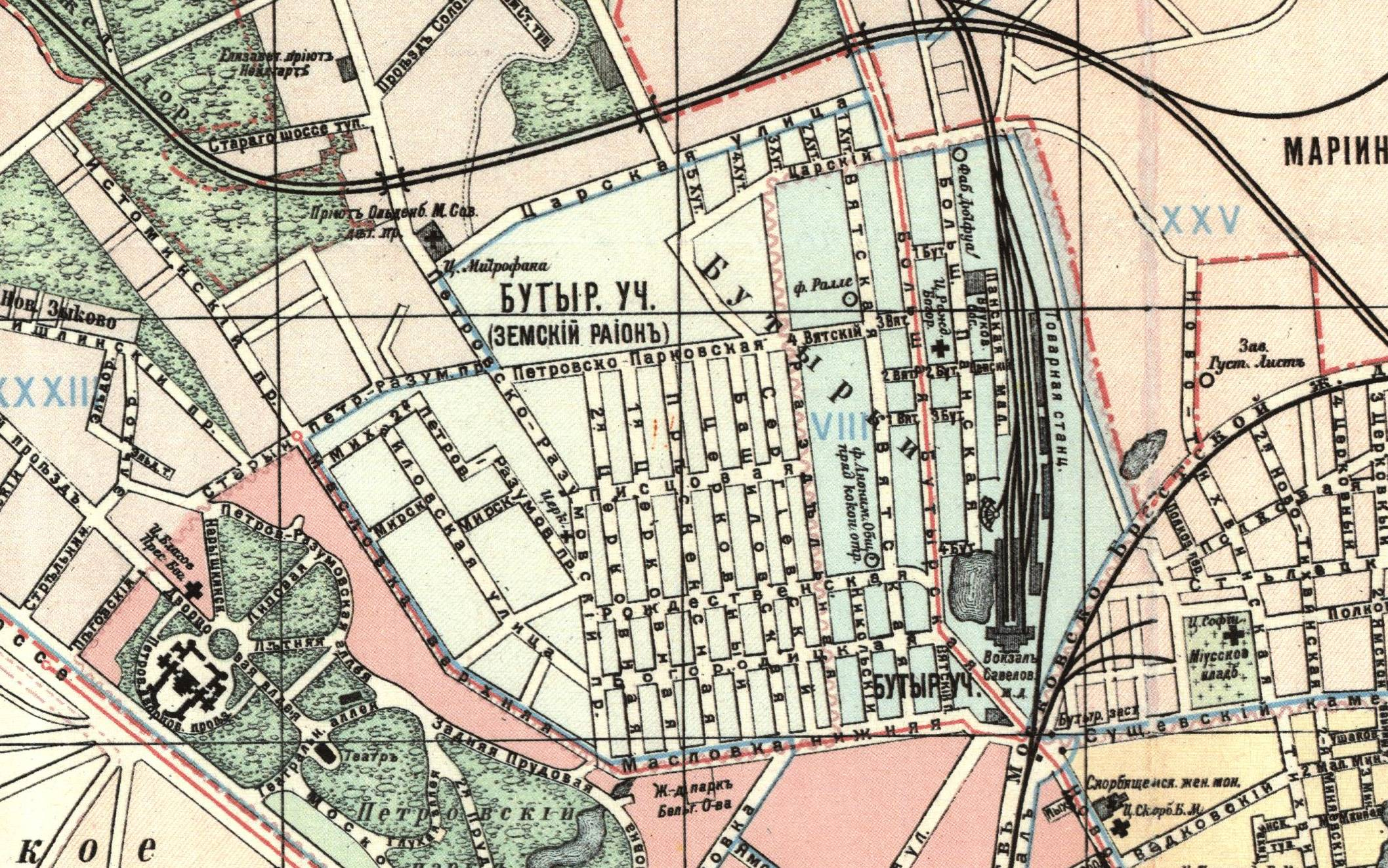
Savyolovskiy District on plan of Moscow 1917

== See also ==
- Administrative divisions of Moscow
