= Communist Party of Western Belorussia =

Former political party in Poland

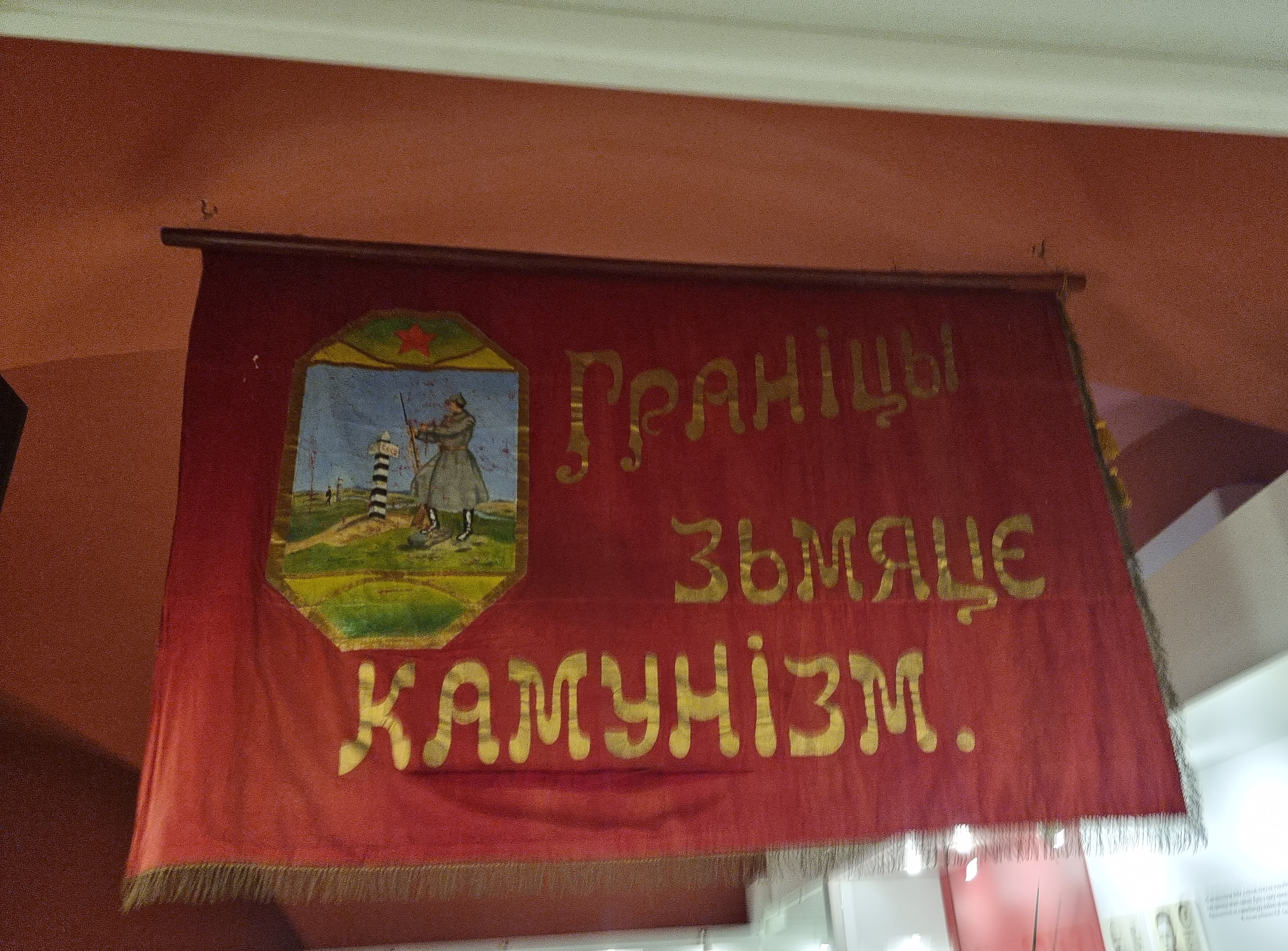
Flag of the Communist Party of Western Belorussia, featuring the motto "Borders are changed by communism" («Граніцы зьмяце камунізм»).

The Communist Party of Western Belorussia (Polish: Komunistyczna Partia Zachodniej Białorusi; Belarusian: Камуністычная партыя Заходняй Беларусі, romanized: Kamunistyčnaja partyja Zachodniaj Biełarusi; abbreviated КПЗБ, KPZB) was a banned political party in the Second Polish Republic, active in the territory of present-day West Belarus from 1923 until 1939, Polesie from 1932 to 1933, Słonim county in 1934, and Vilnius.

== History ==
The party was founded in 1923 in Wilno by representatives of the Belarusian communist circles from Wilno, Białystok and Brest with logistical help from the Bolsheviks. Although its name, the Communist Party of Western Belarus, could suggest a desire for independence of Belarus, wrote historian Sergiusz Łukasiewicz, in reality the party aimed for the transfer of eastern provinces of Poland to the Soviet Union. As this constituted high treason, the party was illegalized by the Polish authorities.

Residents of a town in Eastern Poland (now Western Belarus) assembled to greet the arrival of the Red Army during the Soviet invasion of Poland in 1939. The Russian text reads "Long Live the great theory of Marx, Engels, Lenin-Stalin" and contains a spelling error. Such welcomings were organized by the activists of the Communist Party of West Belarus affiliated with the Communist Party of Poland, delegalized in both countries by 1938.

The party's political program included a socialist revolution in Poland and unification of Western Belorussia with the Belarusian Soviet Socialist Republic in the USSR. The party worked undercover; in 1925-1927 it masked its illegal activities under the legal Belarusian Peasants' and Workers' Union in Poland. It received support from the Soviet Union with leadership brought in secretly from across the border (see Vera Kharuzhaya).

In 1938, following a decision by the Comintern on the orders of Joseph Stalin, the KPZB along with the Communist Party of Poland and the Communist Party of Western Ukraine were delegalized by the USSR under the charge of affiliation with the Polish bourgeoisie. Following the Soviet invasion of Poland and the annexation of Western Belarus to the Soviet Union in 1939, many former members of the KPZB joined the Communist Party of Byelorussia, the East Belarusian branch of the Communist Party of the Soviet Union following the dissolution of the party.

== Notable members ==
- Sergey Pritytsky, future Chairman of Presidium of the Supreme Soviet of Belarus (1968-1971)
- Branislaw Tarashkyevich, linguist, writer, later executed by the Soviets in 1938
- Mikalai Dvornikau, commander of the Ukrainian interbrigade company Taras Shevchenko, died in a battle during Spanish Civil War in 1938
- Maksim Tank, future multiple times awarded writer, Chairman of the Supreme Soviet of Belarus (1965–1971)
- Vera Kharuzhaya, later executed by Nazis in 1942
