= Young Communist League of Western Ukraine =

Young Communist League of Western Ukraine (Polish: Komunistyczny Związek Młodzieży Zachodniej Ukrainy, KZMZU) was the youth league of the Communist Party of Western Ukraine.

== Membership of KZMZU ==
Year	Members
1929	520
1930	1240
1931	1300
1933	3900
1934	1100
1936	8000
