= Ukrainian interbrigade company Taras Shevchenko =

Taras Shevchenko Company
- Українська рота інтербригад імені Тараса Шевченка
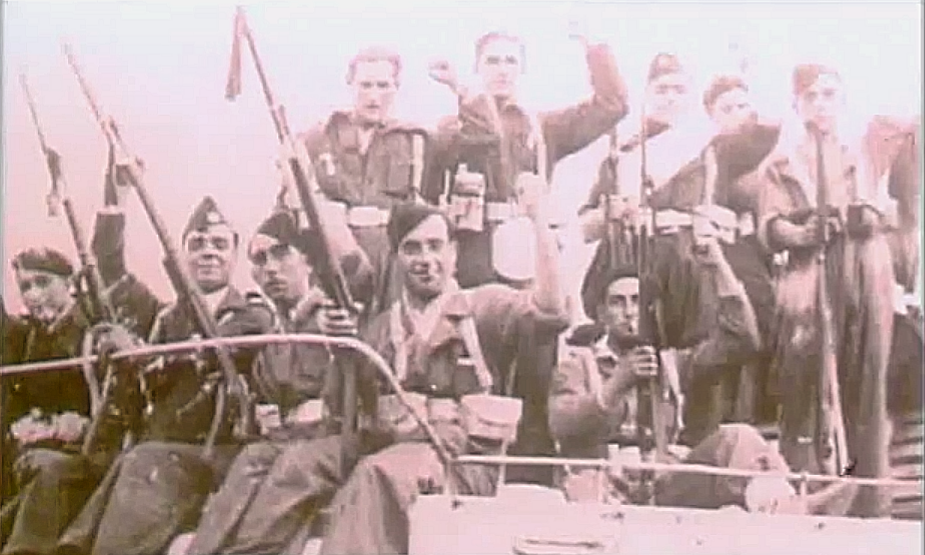
- Ukrainian volunteers in the republican uniform
- Active: June 8, 1937
- Disbanded: September 28, 1938
- Country: Polish Republic (Western Ukraine)
- Allegiance: Spanish Republic
- Branch: International Brigades
- Type: Infantry
- Role: Paramilitary
- Part of: XIII International Brigade
- Garrison/HQ: Albacete (Castilla-La Mancha)
- Nickname: Shevchenkivtsi
- Patron: Taras Shevchenko
- Mottos: Bury me, then rise ye up, and break your heavy chains, and water with the tyrants' blood the freedom you have gained
- Engagements: Spanish Civil War; Battle of Brunete; Zaragoza Offensive; Battle of Teruel; Aragon Offensive; Battle of Caspe; Battle of the Ebro

Commanders
- Company's commander: Stanislav Tomashevych
- Notable commanders: Stanislav Voropay, Symon Krayevsky, Nazar Demyanchuk, Ivan Gritsuk, Pavlo Ivanovich, Yuri Velykanovych, Policarp Krayevsky

The Ukrainian interbrigade company Taras Shevchenko (in Ukrainian Українська рота інтербригад імені Тараса Шевченка) was a Ukrainian formation, which participated in the Spanish Civil War on the Republican side. It was composed of the Ukrainian citizens of Poland (inhabitants of Galicia and Volhynia), who were members of the Communist Party of Western Ukraine.

== Prehistory ==
In the public space of Western Ukraine, the Spanish Civil War became the focus of attention in August 1936. Naturally, the Communist Party of Western Ukraine showed the greatest interest in the conflict. Previously, in May 1936, the progressive intelligentsia of the region condemned fascism and expressed general support for Republican Spain at the Lviv Anti-Fascist Congress.

Under similar slogans, in autumn, demonstrations held in Lviv, Lutsk, Stryi, Stanislav, Rohatyn, Rava-Ruska and Ternopil. At the same time, being impressed by the struggle of the Republic, the leopolitan writer Stepan Tudor wrote a song-march "Passionaria".

On September 20, 1936, a meeting of one thousand construction workers held in Lviv, where the participants declared their solidarity with the Spanish people. And then, on October 3, 1936, an evening of workers' poetry held, where the play "Revolution in Spain" was presented.

The fundraising actions in support of the Madrid government were very successful: only in September–December 1936, in Galicia, 45 thousand zlotys were collected. But the main support to the Spanish Republic was provided by the Ukrainian internationalist soldiers.

== First Ukrainians in Spain ==
The first members of the Communist Party of Western Ukraine arrived in Spain in August 1936. 37 natives of Western Ukraine who worked as miners in Belgium and France came to give support to their Spanish comrades. After them 180 more volunteers from Galicia and Volhynia crossed the Polish-Czechoslovak border and came to Spain. The number of West Ukrainian natives grew to a thousand people, but they did not have their own units. Many interbrigadiers came from the other side of the ocean: 498 volunteers of Eastern European origin came only from Canada, the majority of which were Poles and Ukrainians.

== History of the company ==
=== Appearance ===
On July 8, 1937, the leadership of the Communist Party of Western Ukraine formed the International Brigade Company named after Taras Shevchenko, which became a part of the XIII International Brigade (also known as the Dombrowski Brigade). According to contemporaries, the company recruited people who were full of heroism and willingness to self-sacrifice. Sometimes it was called a monument to the great Ukrainian "revolutionary poet". The brigade newspaper "Dambrowchik" has published many articles about the soldiers of the company. His first commander was the Belarusian Stanislav Tomashevich, and Pavel Ivanovich, an emigrant from France, who became the deputy commander of the company.

=== Battle path ===
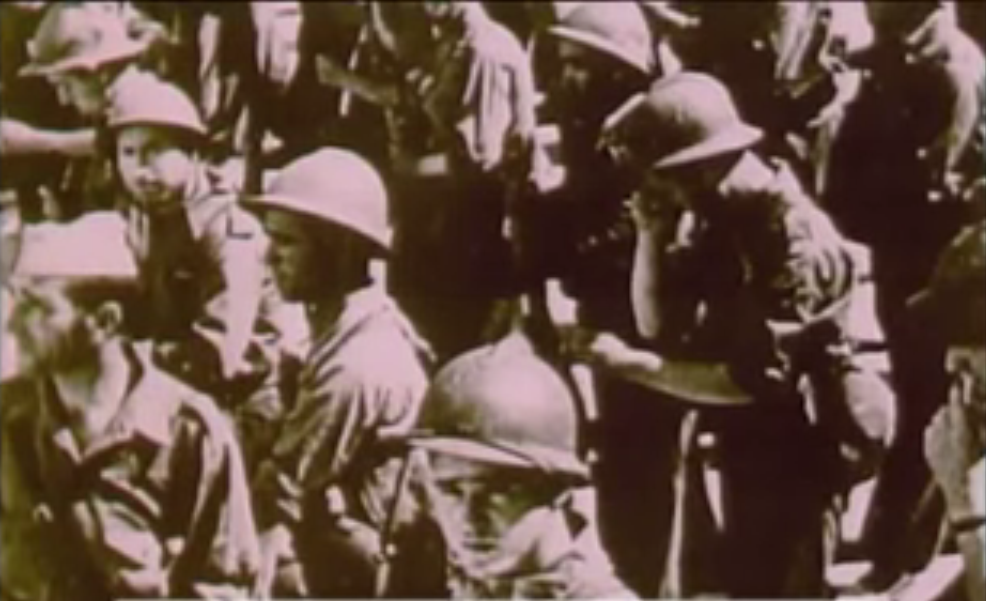
The Taras Shevchenko company on the march.

Its battle baptism took place in the Battle of Brunete to the west of Madrid: the Moroccan cavalry was defeated by the Ukrainians and Poles. In addition, they captured francoists' positions under Villafranca del Castillo and Romanillos de Atienza. In those cruel battles the company lost half of its staff.

On the front of Aragon, on August 25, 1937, the Ukrainians broke the defence of the Italians, bursting into the rear and advanced 10 kilometres. In protracted battles, the company soldiers were fighting with enemy forces that surpassed them in number and quality of weapons, often the fighters ran out of ammunition. The company commissar Nazar Demyanchuk (a native of Volinia, who lived in Canada), the brave fighters Vasyl Lozovy, Yosyp Konovalyuk, Valentyn Pavlusevich, Yosyp Petrash distinguished themselves with courage and heroism in these events.

Some prisoners of the Polish jails (Dmytro Zakharuk and Symon Krayevsky, natives of the Stanislav region, prisoners of Dubno prison in Volinia) fled the prison and reached Spain to help their comrades.

The company soldiers were awarded orders by the brigade commanders and the General Commissariat of the Interbrigades. At the end of 1937, the publication of the Ukrainian-language newspaper "Struggle" (the original name "Боротьба") was launched, where Taras Shevchenko's poems and the articles about the most glorious pages of the company were published. For recruits in Albacete the newspaper "News from Western Ukraine" (the original name "Вісті із Західної України") was published.

=== Last days of the company ===
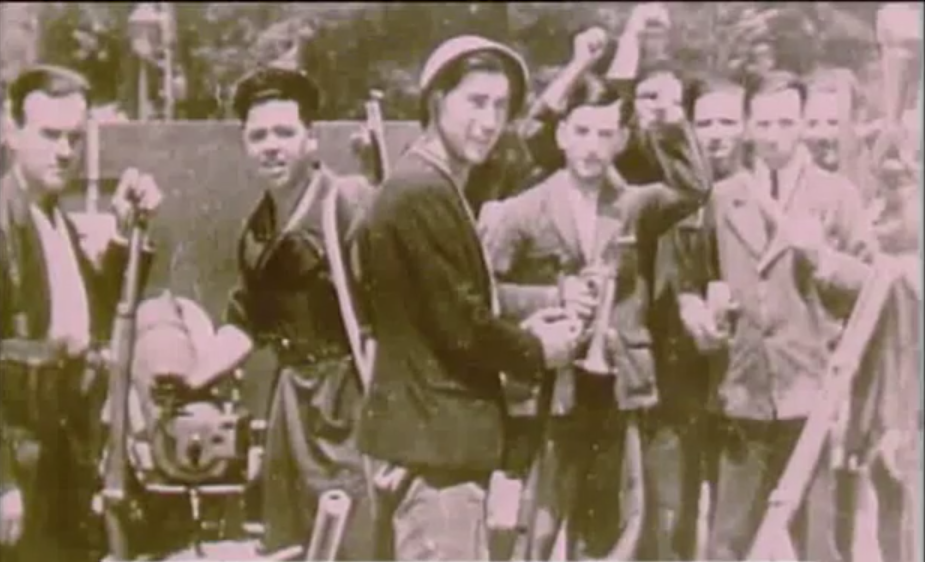
Ukrainian interbrigadiers.

In December 1937 - February 1938, the company fought for Sierra Quemado in a terrible blizzard: at an altitude of 2000 meters, they resisted the attacks during the Battles of Teruel. They managed to capture a large number of falangists' weapons: rifles, cannons, several armed trucks. The brothers Polycarp and Simon Krayevsky themselves smashed the machine gunners, destroying two squads and capturing their positions. In those battles, the company commander Tomashevich, political instructor Demyanchuk, sergeant Seradzky and Polikarp Kraevsky were killed.

In March 1938, on the Andalusian front, the company was surrounded, and despite the never-ending fascists' attacks near Caspe, four times they managed to break out the ring. In those battles, the commander Stanislav Voropai (Voropayev) and political instructor Simon Kraevsky fell. On March 23, her fighters inflicted a powerful blow to the falangists in Lerida (the fighters Mizyurko and Leonchuk distinguished themselves).

In July–September 1938, the company participated in fierce battles on the Catalan (Aragonese) front, having repulsed seven attacks of the fascists on September 2. Shortly after, in the Battles of the Ebro river, the newspaper editors Shyster and Yuri Velykanovych were killed - Velykanovych, who after the death of Shyster took his post, died on September 4, 1938.

On October 28, a farewell march of the International Brigades was held in Barcelona. The Spaniards and Catalans glorified the Ukrainian volunteers who were leaving Spain as their heroes and presented them flowers. The company became famous as one of the most efficient: it always adhered to the "Seek the enemy" rule, made frequent incursions and counter-attacks, and fought skilfully against the tanks.

== Homage ==
In the USSR, the internationalist warriors were recognized as heroes who honestly fulfilled their international duty. In 1982, a monument to Yuri Velykanovych, as one of the company leaders, was installed in Lviv. In addition, a street was named after Velykanovych (renamed by the authorities in 1991 after gaining independence). On that street, there was a school with in-depth study of the Spanish language.

In May 2015, some vandals cut off the head of the statue. The monument was dismantled for restoration, and then returned to its place. At night, on December 2, 2017, the members of a neo-Nazi group threw the sculpture to the ground, drew on the pedestal the slogan "Down with the Communist!" and left a signature of their gang.

Company's military history formed basis of the artistic novel And now, and always (1981) by the leopolitan writer Yuri Pokalchuk. According to his script, the director Victor Kolodniy made a documentary Rota im. Tarasa Shevchenko (Ukrtelefilm, 1989), where the formation veterans' interviews were represented.

== Famous military personnel ==
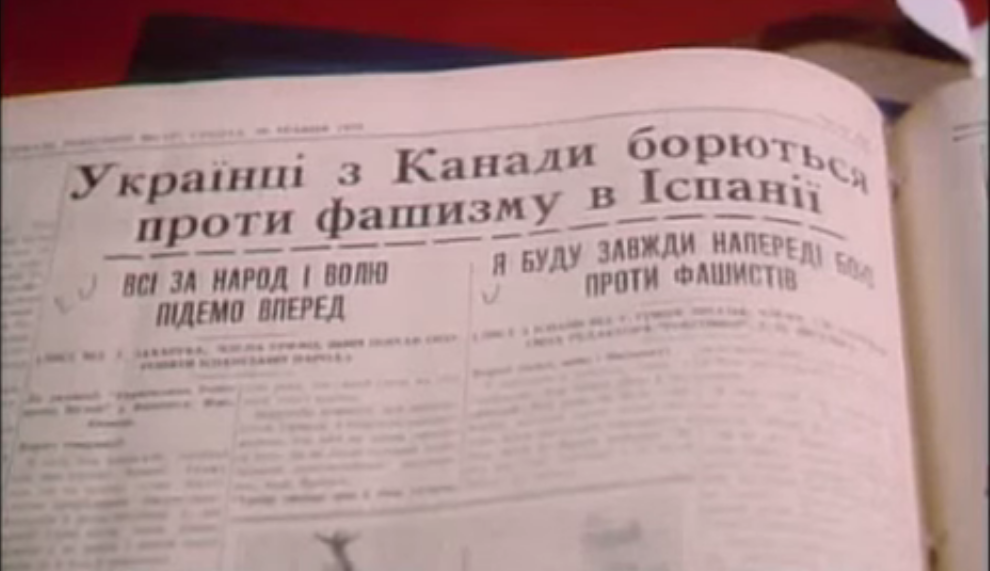
The article in a Canadian newspaper about the Ukrainians from Canada who fight against fascism in Spain.

=== Commanders ===
- Mikalai Dvornikau (Stanislav Tomashevych)
- Stanislav Voropay (Voropayev)
- Symon Krayevsky
- Ivan Gritsuk
- Pavlo Ivanovich (subcomandante)

=== Political instructors ===
- Nazar Demyanchuk ("Sargento Siradz")
- Policarp Krayevsky

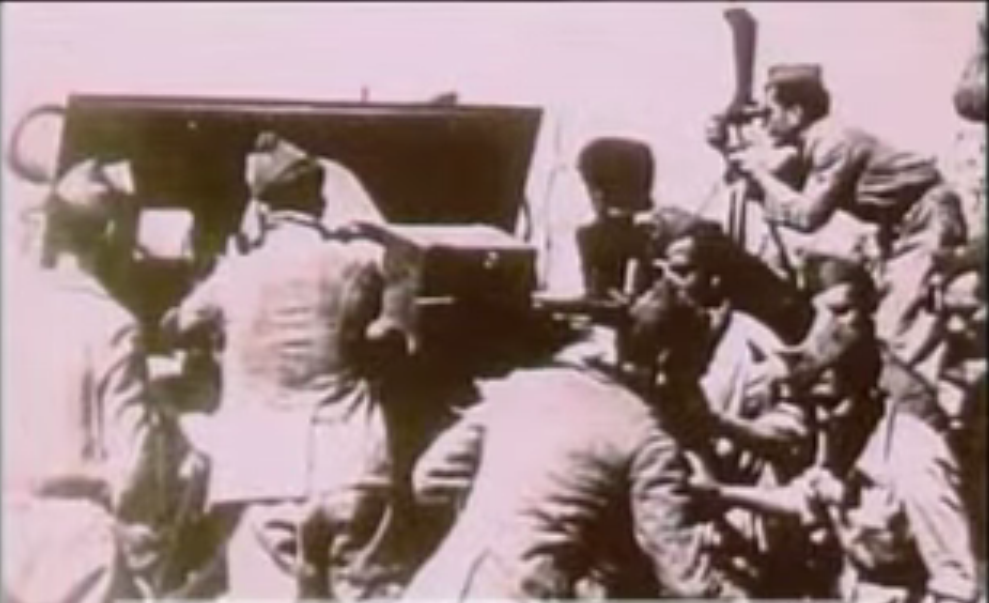
The fighters on their positions during a battle.

=== Ordinary soldiers ===
- Vasyl Lozovy
- Yosyp Konovalyuk
- Valentyn Pavlusevich
- Yosyp Petrash
- Dmytro Zakharuk
- Mykhailo Lytvyn

== Bibliography ==
- Baxell, R. (2014). Myths of the International Brigades. Bulletin of Spanish Studies: Hispanic Studies and Researches on Spain, Portugal and Latin America, 11-24
- Jackson, M. (1994). Fallen sparrows. The International Brigades in the Spanish Civil War.
- Momryk, M. (1991). Ukrainian volunteers from Canada in the International brigades, Spain, 1936–39. Journal of Ukrainian Studies, 16, Nos. 1-2, 181-194g
- Golod, I. (2011). Galicians in Spain. How the Taras Shevchenko company fought the fascists. Ukrainska Pravda (10.01.2017) (in Ukrainian)
- Gusarov, V. (1986). Solidarity of the workers of Ukrainian SSR with patriots of Republican Spain Ukrainian historical journal, № 7, 112-118 (in Ukrainian)
- Danilov, S. (2004). The Spanish Civil War. Moscow : Veche (in Russian)
- Lyalka, Y. (1986). International solidarity of the working people of Western Ukrainian with Republican Spain (1936–1939). Ukrainian historical journal, № 7, 118-127 (in Ukrainian)
- Lyalka, Y. (1986). Ukrainian volunteers in Spain (the 50th anniversary of the national revolutionary war of Spanish people). October, № 12, 87-92 (in Ukrainian)
- Meshcheryakov, M. (1993). The fate of international brigades in Spain in the light of new documents. Modern and Contemporary History, № 5, 18-41 (in Russian)
- Gulevich, V. & Dyatlenko, M. (ed). (1970). International solidarity in the struggle against fascism (1933–1945). Kyiv : Naukova dumka (Scientific opinion) (in Ukrainian)
- Polyansky, P. (2004). Violence during the Spanish Civil War 1936–1939. Memory of centuries, № 1, 143-155 (in Ukrainian)
- Savchuk, V. (1989). Using of documents State Archives of Lviv region in the television movie «Taras Shevchenko company». Archives of Ukraine, № 2, 25-27 (in Ukrainian)
- Honigsman, Y. (1989). Fraternal aid of workers in Western Ukraine to the Spanish people in the struggle against fascism (1936–1939). Lviv, 1989 (in Russian)
- Hugh, T. (2003). Spanish Civil War 1931–1939. Moscow : ZAO Tsentrpoligraf (in Russian)
- Shevchenko, F. (1961). Taras Shevchenko company in the struggle against fascism in Spain (1937–1938). Ukrainian historical journal, № 1, 101-114 (in Ukrainian)
- Yakubuv, A. (2013). Our compatriots in the struggle with communism in Spain. – Ukrainska Pravda (10.01.2017) (in Ukrainian)
