= Yuri Velykanovych =

- Ю́рій Дми́трович Великано́вич
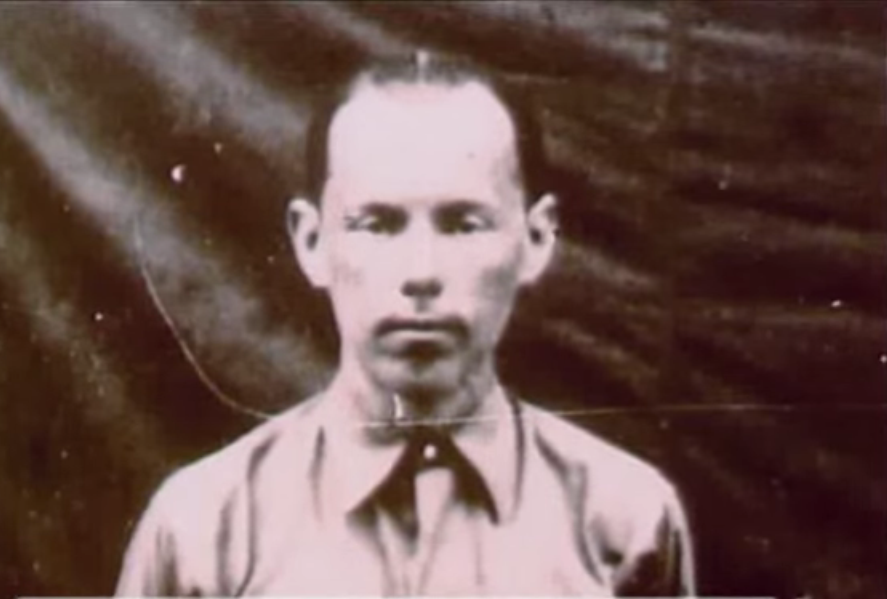
- A photo of Yuri Velykanovych during his participation in the International Brigades
- Born: 1910; Turka, Galicia, Austria-Hungary (now Ukraine)
- Died: September 7, 1938 (aged 27–28); Ebro Valley, Spanish Republic
- Cause of death: Mortally wounded in a battle
- Monuments: Lviv (demolished)
- Citizenship: Polish Republic
- Education: Jan Kazimierz University
- Occupation: Journalist
- Political party: Communist Party of Western Ukraine

Yuri Dmytrovych Velykanovych (ukr. Ю́рій Дми́трович Великано́вич; 1910 – September 7, 1938) was a participant in the Spanish Civil War, Ukrainian interbrigadist, member of the Communist Party of Western Ukraine.

== Biography ==
Yuri Velykanovych was born in a family of teachers, Emilia and Dmytro Velykanovych, in the village of Ilnyk (Austria-Hungary, nowadays Stryi Raion, Lviv Oblast, Ukraine), where he graduated from school. In 1920 he studied in the Ukrainian grammar school in Lviv. Then he entered the Faculty of Philology at the Jan Kazimierz University (nowadays Ivan Franko National University of Lviv). As a student he joined the Communist Party of Western Ukraine.

In the summer of 1936, he was a fighter of the International Brigades in Spain during the Civil War.

In July 1937, he was a member of the company named after Taras Shevchenko (a part of the XIII Dabrowski Brigade) composed of Ukrainian communists from Galicia and Volhynia. In the interbrigadist press Velykanovych published his articles and correspondence in Polish, Spanish and Ukrainian about Taras Shevchenko's life and creativity, about the battle way of the company ("Taras Shevchenko", "The Ukrainians in the International Brigades", "Taras Shevchenko in the Aragon Front" and others).

On September 4, 1938, he was mortally wounded in the battle of the Ebro river.

== Homage ==
During the Soviet era, in 1982, a monument to Velykanovych was erected in Lviv. In addition a street was named Velykanovych (renamed by the authorities in 1991 after gaining independence). On that street there was a school with deep learning of Spanish.

In May 2015, the vandals cut off the head of the statue. The monument was dismantled for restoration, and then returned to its place.

At night on December 2, 2017, members of the neo-Nazi group C14 threw the sculpture to the ground, drew the slogan "Down with the communist!" on the pedestal, and left the signature of their gang.
