= Mikalai Dvornikau =

Belarusian militant and Spanish Civil War volunteer

Mikalai Mikalaevich Dvornikau
- Мікалай Мікалаевіч Дворнікаў (Belarusian)
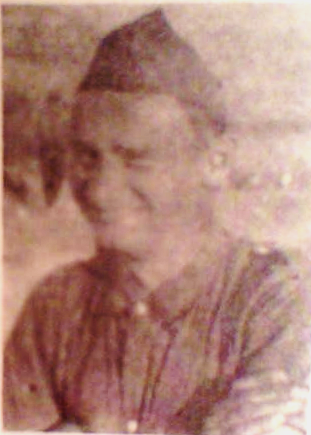
- Mikalai Dvornikau in the Republican uniform during the Spanish Civil War
- Born: 7 December 1907; Gomel, Russian Empire
- Died: 16 February 1938 (aged 30); Extremadura, Spain
- Military career
- Allegiance: Communist International; Second Spanish Republic
- Branch: International Brigades
- Service years: 1936–1938
- Rank: Political instructor
- Nicknames: Gerasim, Andrei, Anton, Stanislav Tomashevich, Robert, Petya
- Units: Jose Palafox battalion, Taras Shevchenko Company
- Conflicts: Spanish Civil War
- Memorials: Gomel

Mikalai Dvornikau (Belarusian: Мікалай Мікалаевіч Дворнікаў, Mikalai Mikalaevich Dvornikau Russian: Николай Николаевич Дворников, Nikolai Nikolaevich Dvornikov) known under the pseudonyms Gerasim, Andrei, Anton, Stanislav Tomashevich, Robert and Petya (7 December 1907 – 16 February 1938) was a Soviet Belarusian political militant, a member of the Communist Party of Western Belarus and the Communist Youth League (Komsomol) of Western Belarus. He was a participant of the Spanish Civil War, political instructor of the Jose Palafox battalion and commander of the Ukrainian interbrigade company Taras Shevchenko.

== Biography ==
Mikalai Dvornikau was born on 7 December 1907, in Gomel in a working-class family. Since 1926 he worked on swamps draining, at the construction sites of the bridge over the Sozh river, and the Palace of Culture of Railway Workers, was a worker of the agricultural machinery plant "Gomselmash". Since 1927 he was a member of the Belarusian Komsomol, since 1929 was a member of the All-Union Communist Party (Bolsheviks). In 1928–1929 he was the secretary of the Komsomol organization of the Gomselmash plant; in 1929–1931 was the secretary of a district committee of the Komsomol. Since January 1931 he was a member of the Central Committee of the Belarusian Komsomol.

=== Underground in Western Belarus ===
In 1932, Dvornikau attended the Party School courses organized by the Central Committee of the CPWB in Minsk, and then since November 1932 was sent to underground work to Western Belarus (controlled by the Second Polish Republic), appointed as the Secretary of the Bialystok, and then the Brest Regional Committee of the illegal Western Belarusian Komsomol.

In May–July 1933, in the forests near Brest, under Dvornikau's leadership, a conference of the Brest Regional Committee of the CPWB took place. It was decided to launch mass protests of the peasants of the Brest region; a campaign of mass peasant actions against landlords was approved. Dvornikau became one of the organizers of the peasants' armed uprising on 3–4 August in Kobryń district, which was brutally suppressed, and ended with pacification actions and arrests. Dvornikau launched a mass national-wide campaign in support of the communists sentenced to death for participation in the uprising. As a result, they succeeded in softening of the sentence.

In November 1933, he was co-opted to the Central Committee Secretariat of the CPWB and started his work in Wilno. Since October 1935, he continues his activities in Poland as the First Secretary of the Central Committee of the Western Belarusian Komsomol.

He organized an assassination attempt on the Polish political intelligence agent Jan Strelchuk, who had been infiltrated into the communist underground and had revealed many CPWB members. The action took place on 27 January 1935, during Strelchuk was giving his testimony at the trial against a group of 17 revolutionaries in Wilno. Dvornikau was the backup of the main executor Sergey Pritytsky. After the police had attempted to arrest him, Dvornikau wounded a policeman and run away.

=== Civil War in Spain ===
From 1936 to 1938, Dvornikau fought in the fronts of the Spanish Civil War on the Republican side. Under the pseudonym Staislav Tomashevich he served as a political instructor in the Jose Palafox Battalion, which was a part of the XIII Dombrowski International Brigade. Since the end of 1937 he was the first commander of the Ukrainian interbrigade company Taras Shevchenko, where the Ukrainian and Belarusian communists from Poland and other countries served. Dvornikau fell on 16 February 1938, fighting against the Nationalists in the mountains of Extremadura.

== Homage ==
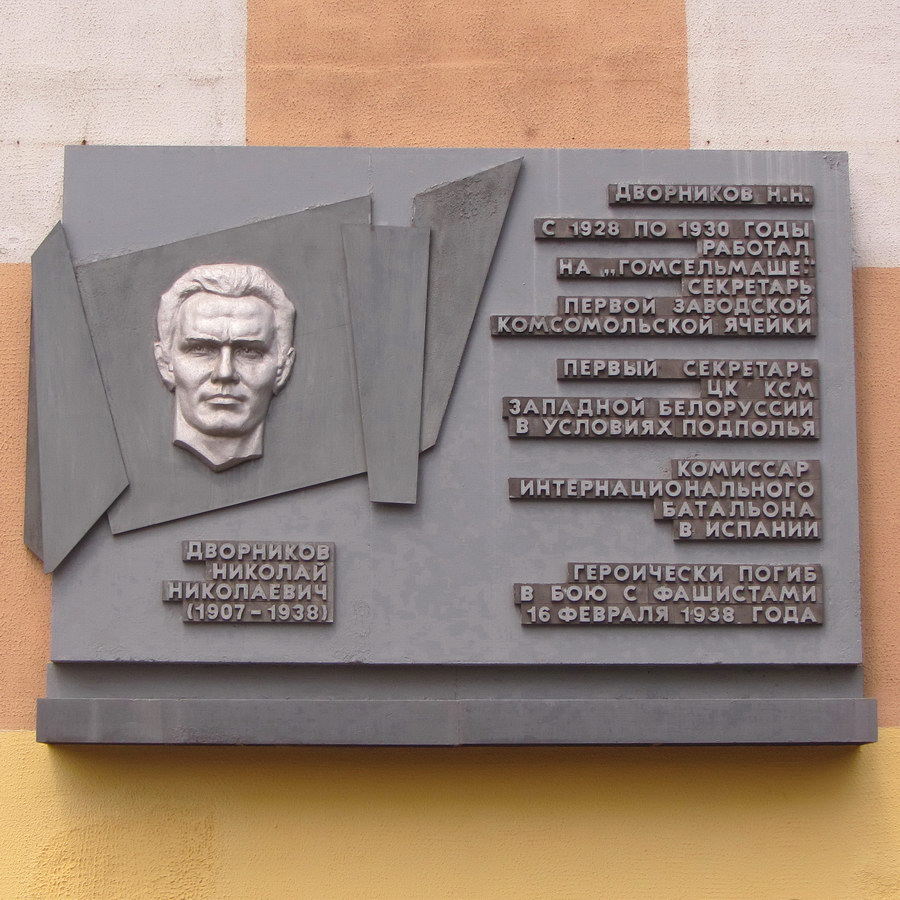
A memorial plaque to Mikalai Dvornikau on the walls of the plant "Gomselmash". Installed in 1970.

In 1978 he was perpetuated in the poem "Mikalai Dvornikau", written by his underground times comrade Maksim Tank.

Two streets in Gomel and Brest are named after Mikalai Dvornikau. On the walls of the "Gomselmash" plant, where he worked being young, there is a memorial plaque.

== Bibliography ==
- Słownik biograficzny działaczy polskiego ruchu robotniczego t. 1, Warszawa 1978.
- Шафаренко, Е. Николай Дворников. Он же Герасим, он же Стах Томашевич //Гомел. вед. – 2007. – 4 дек. – С.6.
- Дробинский, Я. От Гомеля до Эстремадуры. Минск, "Беларусь", 1971.
- Дробинский, Я. Еще о Николае Дворникове / Я. Дробинский // Нёман. – 1966. – No 8. – С.156 – 158.
- Ласкович, В. Дворников, коммунист (Страницы революционного прошлого Брестчины) / В. Ласкович // Заря. – 1967. – 11 июля.
