= Dvornikov =

Dvornikov (Russian: Дворников) is a Russian surname. Notable people with the name include:

- Aleksandr Vladimirovich Dvornikov, (born 1961), Russian general
- Fyodor Andreyevich Dvornikov, (born 1992), Russian football player
- Boris Gennadyevich Dvornikov (born 1961), Soviet and Russian marathoner and track and field coach, Honored Coach of Russia
- Denis Vladimirovich Dvornikov (born 1977), member of the Public Chamber
- George Timofeevich Dvornikov (1923–1974), Soviet military officer
- Leonid Trofimovich Dvornikov (born 1934), doctor of technical sciences, professor, head of the department of Siberian State Industrial University
- Mikhail Dvornikov:
  - Mikhail Alexandrovich Dvornikov (born 1973), general director of LLC "RIAS"
  - Mikhail Grigoryevich Dvornikov (born 1950), doctor of biological sciences, associate professor
  - Mikhail Pavlovich Dvornikov (1906–1990), Soviet design engineer
  - Mikhail Sergeevich Dvornikov (born 1972), urologist, candidate of sciences
  - Mikhail Sergeevich Dvornikov (born 1973), clinical psychologist, professor
  - Mikhail Valerievich Dvornikov (born 1990), Russian lawyer
  - Mikhail Vladimirovich Dvornikov (born 1971), founder and former owner of the Savelovsky and Stankolit shopping complexes
  - Mikhail Vladimirovich Dvornikov (born 1971), vice-president of the "Chamber of Commerce and Industry"
  - Mikhail Vladimirovich Dvornikov (born 1973), chairman of the board of directors of LLC "Moslesgroup"
  - Mikhail Vladimirovich Dvornikov (born 1973), founder and general director of LLC "Alfapro M"
  - Mikhail Vyacheslavovich Dvornikov (born 1949), professor of Moscow Aviation Institute
  - Mikhail Yakovlevich Dvornikov (born 1952), artist, member of the Union of Artists
  - Mikhail Yuryevich Dvornikov (born 1989), Russian track and field athlete, discus thrower
- Nikolai Nikolaevich Dvornikov (1907–1938), Soviet Belarusian political figure
- Prokofiy Ignatevich Dvornikov (1905–1967), Soviet scientist, agronomist-breeder, academician of the Academy of Sciences of the Moldavian SSR
- Tit Yakovlevich Dvornikov (1862–1922), Russian painter, member of the Association of Traveling Art Exhibitions
- Fyodor Petrovich Dvornikov (born 1870), Biysk industrialist
- Anna Sergeevna Dvorniková (born 1944), Soviet economic, state and political figure
- Tamara Vasilyevna Dvorniková (born 1949), Soviet economic and political figure, deputy of the Council of the Union of the Supreme Soviet of the USSR, 9th convocation
