= Maksim Tank =

Belarusian poet

Maksim Tank Jaŭhien Skurko
- Яўген Скурко
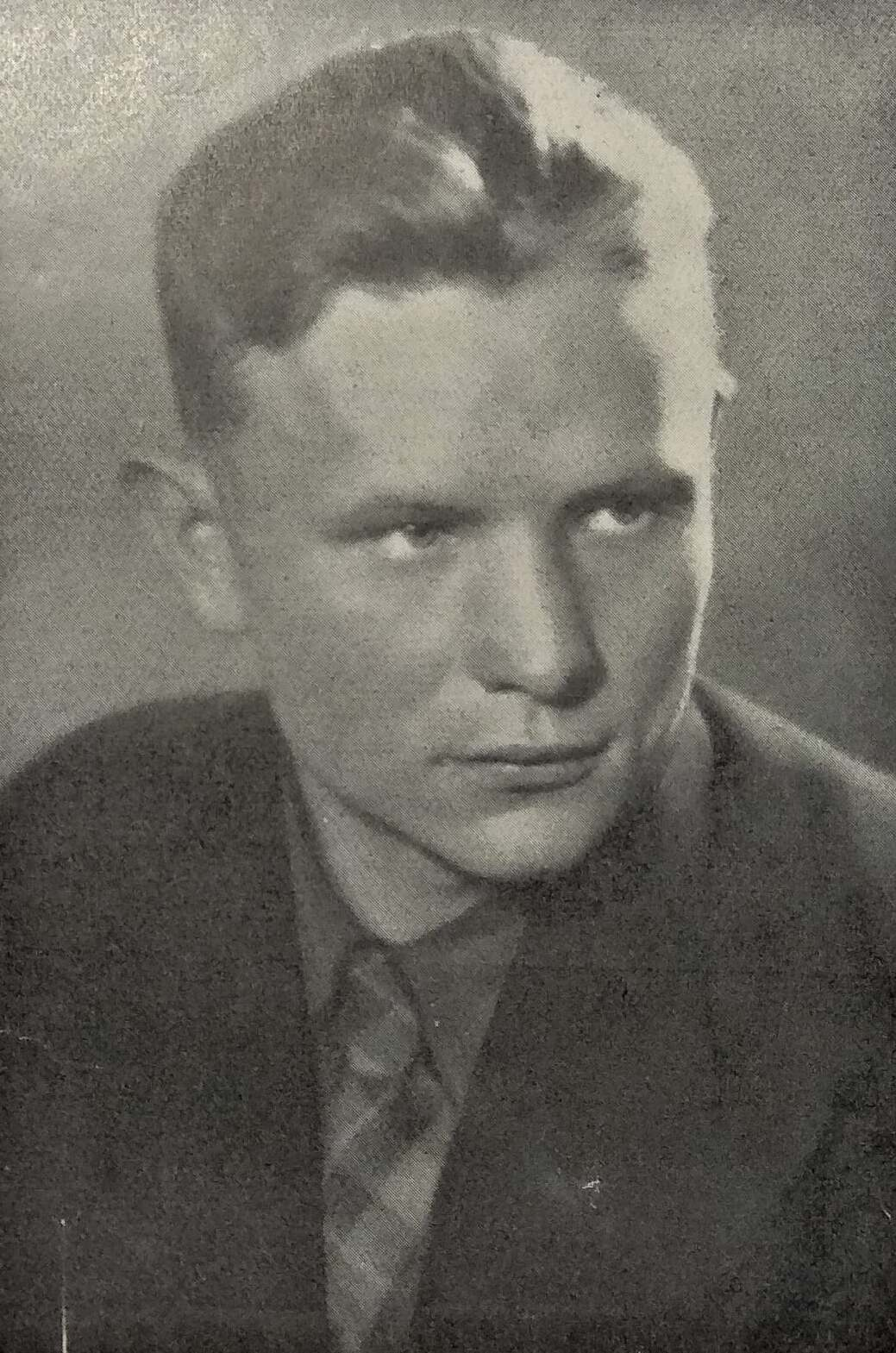
- Born: Jaŭhien Skurko; Eugeniusz Skurko; 17 September 1912; Piĺkaŭščyna, Russian Empire
- Died: 7 August 1995 (aged 82); Minsk, Belarus
- Resting place: Noviki, Miadziel Raion
- Citizenship: Poland; Soviet Union; Belarus
- Occupations: Writer, journalist, editor, statesman
- Spouse: Luboŭ Asajevič
- Writing career
- Pen name: Maksim Tank, Aŭhien Bura, A. Granit
- Language: Belarusian
- Years active: more than 60
- Period: Late 1920s – 1990s
- Genre: Poetry
- Subjects: Belarusian national liberation, social issues

Maksim Tank

Chairman of the Supreme Soviet of the Belarusian SSR
- In office 1963–1971

Member of the Supreme Soviet of the USSR
- In office 1969–1989

Personal details
- Party: Communist Party of the Soviet Union
- Other political affiliations: Communist Party of West Belarus
- Awards: Lenin Prize; Stalin Prize; Hero of Socialist Labor

Maksim Tank (Belarusian: Максі́м Танк, Russian: Макси́м Танк, real name Jaŭhien Skurko, Belarusian: Яўге́н Іва́навіч Скурко́; Russian: Евге́ний Ива́нович Скурко́; 17 September 1912 – 7 August 1995) was a Belarusian Soviet poet, journalist and translator.

== Childhood and activism in West Belarus ==
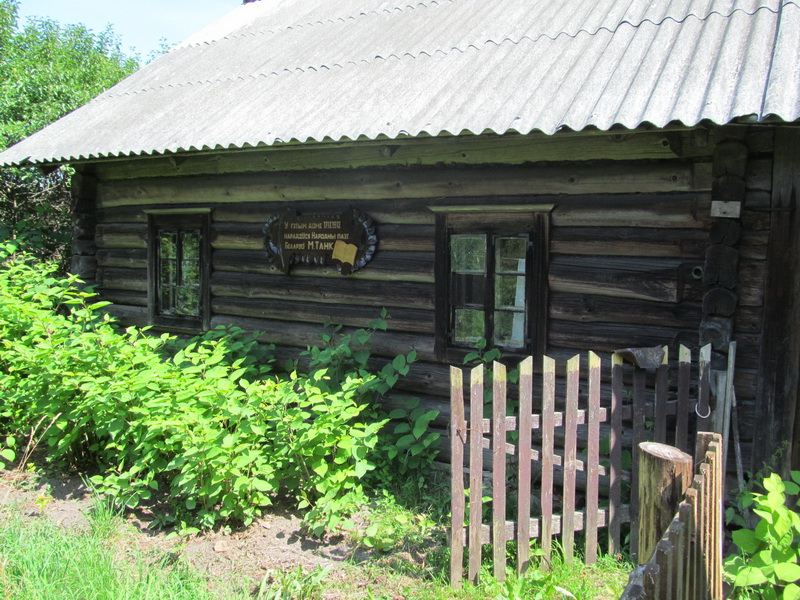
The birthplace and local museum of Maksim Tank

Jaŭhien Skurko was born into a wealthy peasant family in a khutor about a kilometer away from the village Piĺkaŭščyna (Belarusian: Пількаўшчына), now in Myadzyel District, Minsk Oblast, Belarus. In 1914, his family went to Moscow as refugees from the approaching First World War and lived there till 1922.

Because of the hunger in Russia, the family returned to its home village, which by then became part of the Second Polish Republic.

In 1928, Skurko joined an underground communist youth organization in his school in Radashkovichy. Despite good performance in the school, in 1929 he was expelled together with several other pupils for participating in a protest against closure of Belarusian schools by the Polish authorities. He was also expelled from his following school in Wilno for participation in student protests.

In early 1930s, Jaŭhien Skurko participated in the Belarusian underground communist activism, writing for Belarusian and Polish underground publications. In 1932, he was arrested and placed in the Lukiškės Prison in Wilno.

In late 1932, he illegally crossed the border with the Soviet Union and joined Belarusian underground group in Minsk. He was eventually arrested by the Soviet authorities, interrogated by the NKVD and deported to Poland. After his return, he was an activist of the illegal youth branch of the Communist Party of West Belarus in Wilno and Navahrudak. He was several times arrested and spent a total of two years in prison.

In 1936, Skurko was admitted into the underground Communist Party of West Belarus.

== Career in the USSR ==
After the annexation of West Belarus by the Soviet Union, Skurko worked as a culture journalist and as an education administrator in Vilejka.

After the beginning of the war, Skurko was evacuated to Saratov and then returned to the Bryansk Front to work as a reporter for several Soviet publications.

In 1945 – 1948, Skurko worked as editor at the satirical magazine Vozhyk. From 1948 to 1966, he was editor in chief of the major Belarusian literature magazine Polymia.

Since the late 1940s, Skurko held various senior positions in the Belarusian Soviet legislative system. In 1947–1971 he was member of the Supreme Soviet of Belarus; of which he was chairman in 1963–1971. In 1969 – 1989 he was member of the Supreme Soviet of the USSR.

After Belarus regained independence, Maksim Tank admitted being supporter of the Belarusian White, Red and White flag and opposed the controversial referendum to change the national symbols of Belarus organized by president Alexander Lukashenko.

Maksim Tank died in Minsk in August 1995.

== Selected works ==
Collections of verses:

- On Stages (Belarusian: На этапах, 1936)
- The Cranberry Colour (Belarusian: Журавінавы цвет, 1937)
- Under the Mast (Belarusian: Пад мачтай, 1938)
- Sharpen the Arms (Belarusian: Вастрыце зброю), Through the Fiery Horizon (Belarusian: Праз вогненны небасхіл, both 1945)
- In Order to Know (Belarusian: Каб ведалі, 1948)
- On the Stone, Iron and Gold (Belarusian: На камні, жалезе і золаце, 1951)
- On the Road (Belarusian: У дарозе, 1954)
- The Lightning Track (Belarusian: След бліскавіцы, 1957)
- My Daily Bread (Belarusian: Мой хлеб надзённы, 1962)
- The Gulp of Water (Belarusian: Глыток вады, 1964)
- Listen, the Spring is Coming (Belarusian: Паслухайце, вясна ідзе, 1990)
- My Arch (Belarusian: Мой каўчэг, 1994)

Poems:

- Narach (Belarusian: Нарач, 1937)
- Yanuk Sialiba (Belarusian: Янук Сяліба, 1942)

== Memory ==
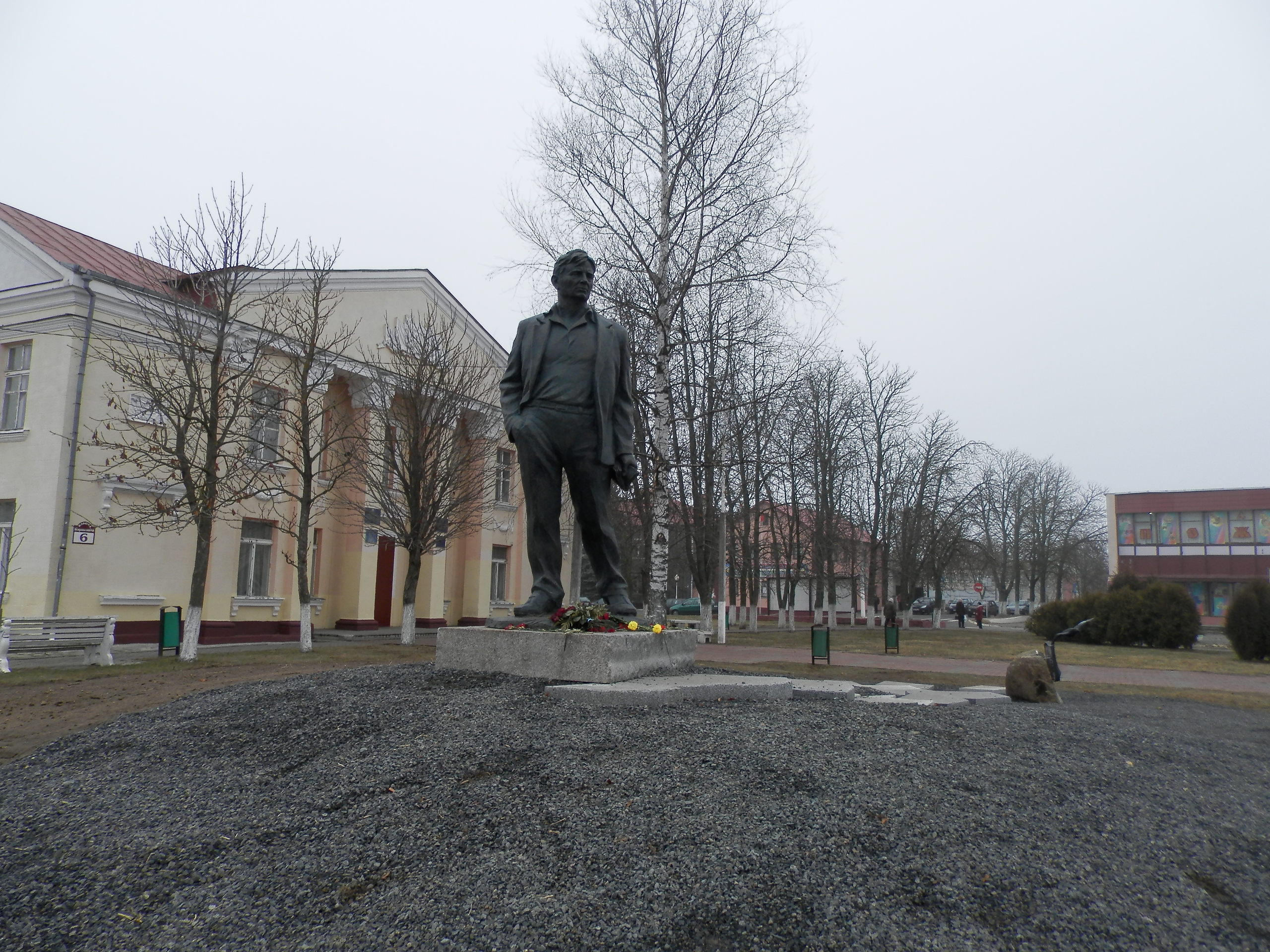
Monument to Maksim Tank in Miadziel

The Maksim Tank Belarusian State Pedagogical University in Minsk was renamed after Maksim Tank in 1995.

There is a monument to Maksim Tank in Miadziel and a street named after him in Minsk.

== Awards ==
- People's Poet of Belarus, 1968
- Hero of Socialist Labour (27 September 1974)
- Four-time laureate of the Order of Lenin
- Order of the October Revolution
- other Soviet and Polish awards
