= Nasha Historiya =

Belarusian magazine

Наша Гісторыя Nasha Historiya (Belarusian magazine)
- Chief editor: Andrej Dyńko
- Founded: 2018
- Country: Belarus
- Language: Belarusian
- ISSN: 2617-2305

Nasha Historiya (Belarusian "Наша Гісторыя") is a Belarusian popular science illustrated magazine. "Nasha Historiya" stands for "Our History" in English.

The first issue of the journal was published on August 17, 2018, by the editors of the Internet portal "Nasha Niva". The first print was sold out within a few days, leading to an additional edition. Andrej Dyńko is the chief editor.

Nasha Historiya magazine sections:

- Where is our family;
- Biography;
- Politics;
- Commonwealth;
- Military glory;
- USSR;
- Peoples of Belarus;
- Pro-world;
- Tourist destinations;
- Our dish;
- Kitchen stories;
- Simple things;
- Economics;
- Jokes;
- Comics.
