= Romanillos de Atienza =

Romanillos de Atienza, Spain
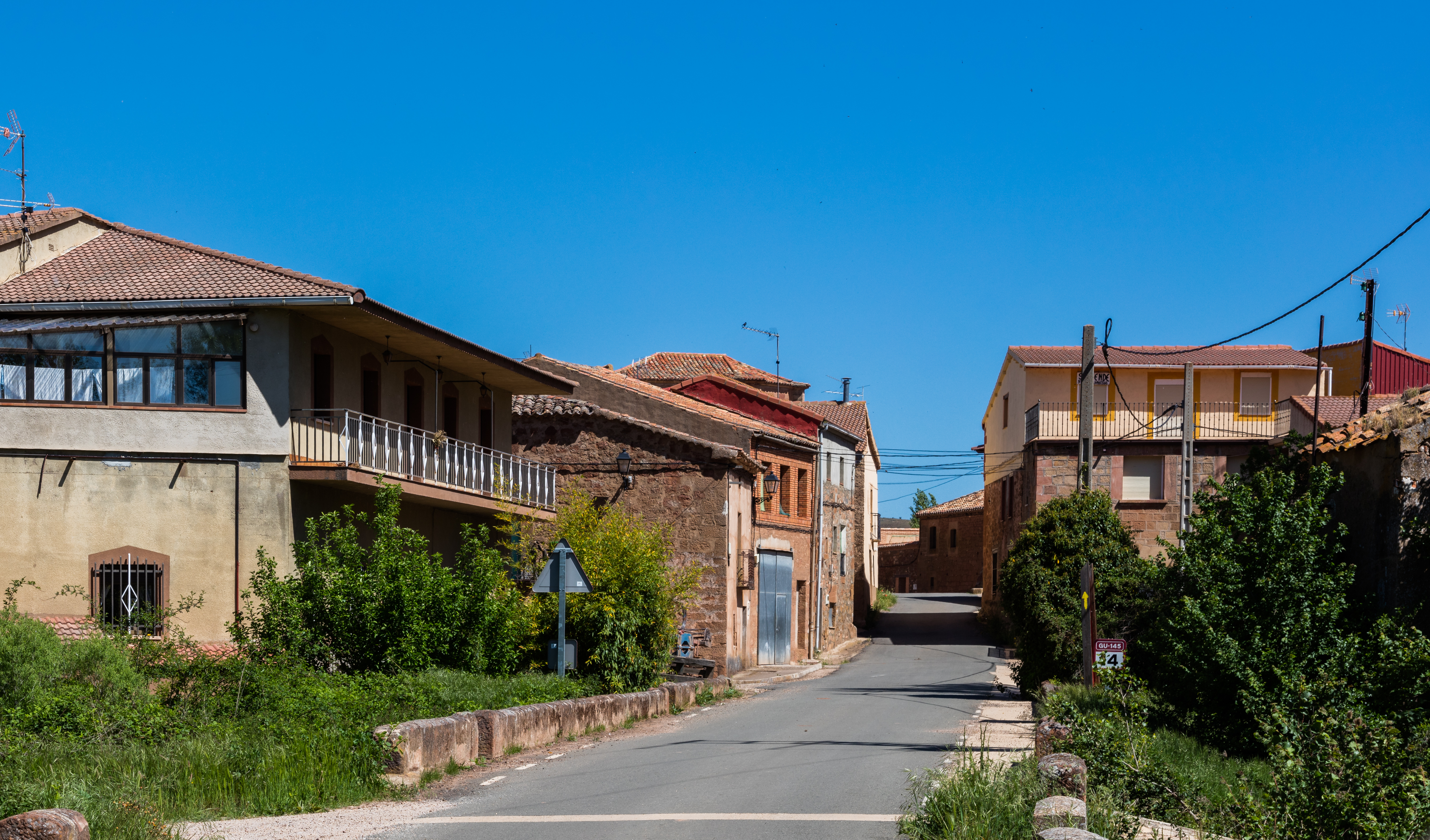

- Location within Province of Guadalajara Location within Castilla-La Mancha Location within Spain
- Country: Spain
- Autonomous community: Castile-La Mancha
- Province: Guadalajara
- Municipality: Romanillos de Atienza

Area
  - Total: 24.01 km^{2} (9.27 sq mi)
- Elevation: 1,105 m (3,625 ft)

Population (2025-01-01)
  - Total: 37
  - Density: 1.5/km^{2} (4.0/sq mi)
- Time zone: UTC+1 (CET)
  - Summer (DST): UTC+2 (CEST)

Romanillos de Atienza is a municipality located in the province of Guadalajara, Castile-La Mancha, Spain. According to the 2004 census (INE), the municipality had a population of 55 inhabitants.
