= Vozhyk =

Belarusian humour magazine

Vozhyk (Belarusian magazine)
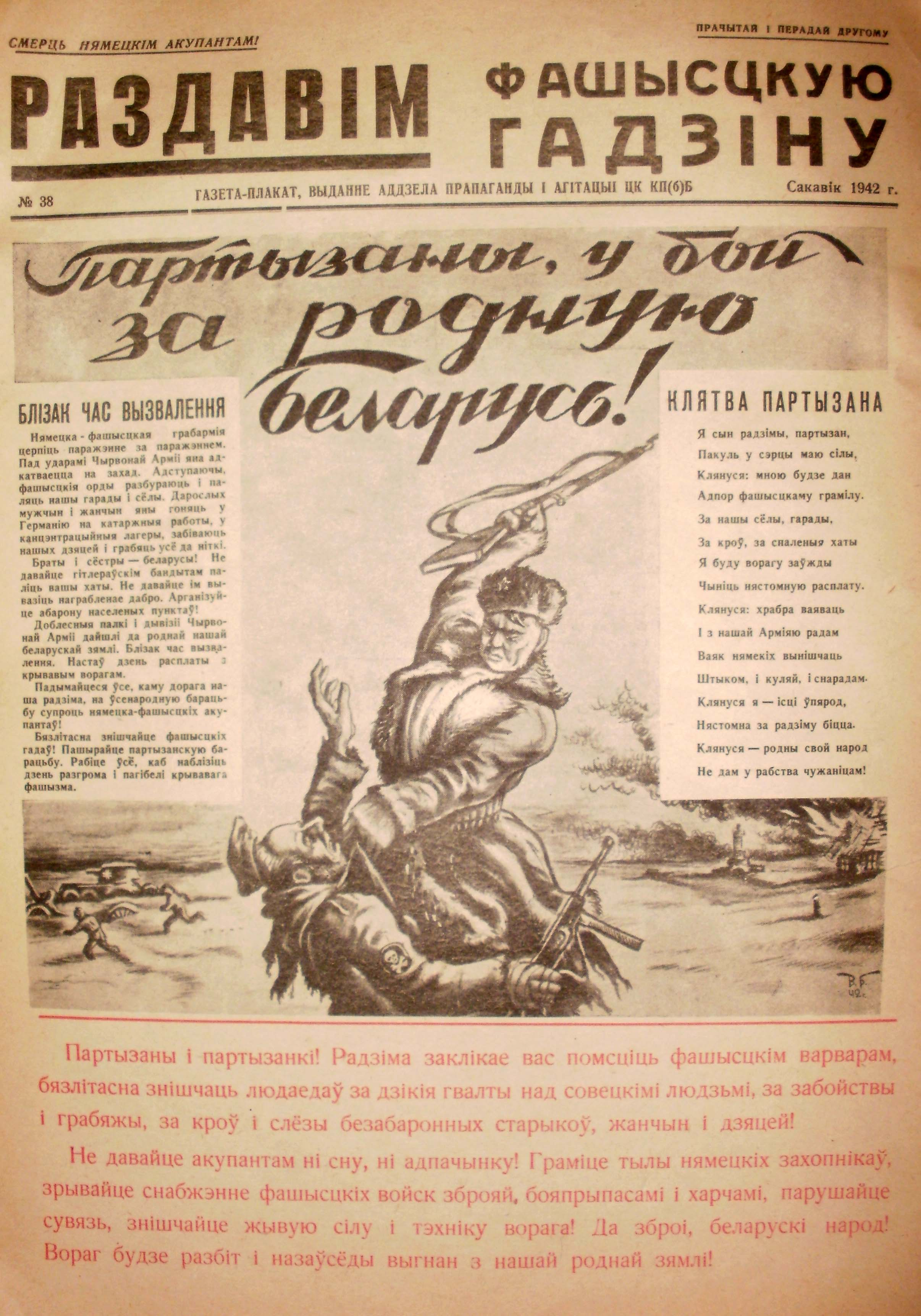
- Crush the Fascist Vermin poster (1942)
- Founded: 1941
- Country: Belarus
- Based in: Minsk
- Language: Belarusian
- Website: http://zviazda.by/be/edition/vozhyk
- ISSN: 0132-5957
- OCLC: 50776451

Vozhyk (Belarusian: Во́жык, Russian: Ёжик) is a Belarusian humour magazine offering satire, cartoons, caricature and humorous essays to its readers. Vozhyk stands for "hedgehog" in Belarusian.

It is published monthly in Minsk, Belarus, in the Belarusian language.

== History ==
The first edition was published in July 1941 as a motivation poster titled Crush the Fascist Vermin (Belarusian: Раздавім фашысцкую гадзіну). In March 1942, it became a poster/newspaper. In August 1945, it became a humorous magazine titled Vozhyk. By 1958, it had 8 pages, then it grew to 12 pages. Vozhyk features satirical articles, pamphlets, fables, parables, poems, stories, interludes, plays, sketches, humoresques, miniatures, parodies, epigrams, puns, aphorisms, jokes, translations of satirical and humorous works, as well as caricatures, cartoons, travesties, and posters. Since 1963, the magazine has been publishing a biannual satirical poster titled On Spines (Belarusian: На калючкi). It also has an addendum named Vozhyk’s Library (Belarusian: Бібліятэка Вожыка).

== Editors-in-chief ==
- Mikhail Chavusski (1941—1943)
- Kandrat Krapiva (1943—1947)
- Mikhail Chavusski (1947—1955)
- Pavel Kovalev (1955—1967)
- Vladimir Korban (1967—1971)
- Alexander Romanav (1971—1987)
- Valentin Blakit (1987—2000)
- Mikhas Pozdnyakov (2000—2002)
- Ales Pismenkov (2002—2004)
- Vladimir Solomakha (2004—2008)
- Yuliya Zaretskaya (since 2009)

== Bibliography ==
- Постановление Совмина Республики Беларусь «Об утверждении Устава редакции журнала „Вожык“»
