= Communist Party of Western Ukraine =

Clandestine party in interwar Poland

Communist Party of Western Ukraine Komunistyczna Partia Zachodniej Ukrainy Комуністична партія Західної України
- Abbreviation: KPZU
- Founded: 1919 (as Communist Party of Eastern Galicia); 1923 (reorganized)
- Dissolved: 1938
- Youth wing: Young Communist League of Western Ukraine
- Ideology: Communism; National Communism
- Political position: Far-left
- International affiliation: Comintern

The Communist Party of Western Ukraine (Polish: Komunistyczna Partia Zachodniej Ukrainy; Ukrainian: Комуністична партія Західної України, romanized: Komunistychna partiya Zakhidnoyi Ukrayiny; abbreviated KPZU) was a clandestine political party active in Ukrainian-populated eastern regions of interwar Poland. The Young Communist League of Western Ukraine was the youth branch of the party.

According to Timothy D. Snyder, the Communist Party of Western Ukraine was an illegal and conspiratorial organization in interwar Galicia and Volhynia. It had a small formal membership but had a large influence via front organizations. Its membership was mostly Ukrainian in the countryside and Jewish in towns. It also had ties to the Communist Party of Bukovina in the Kingdom of Romania.

== History ==
=== Background and establishment ===
Following the restoration of Polish statehood, the Polish National Committee led by Roman Dmowski worked on the establishment of the state borders. Despite Dmowski's support for a monoethnic state, the Polish territory of that time came to include lands populated by significant ethnic minorities, the biggest of which was represented by Ukrainians. In particular, the region of Volhynia had a Ukrainian ethnic majority, with 68% Ukrainians and 16,6% Poles living in that administrative unit according to official census data.

Communist Party of Western Ukraine had its roots in the Communist Party of Eastern Galicia (Комуністична Партія Східної Галичини, Komunistyczna Partia Wschodniej Galicji, also known as Communist Party of Eastern Galicia and Bukovina), which was established in the winter of 1919–1920 in Vinnytsia by the Central Committee of the Communist Party of Ukraine (CPU (B)). In April 1920, the Galician Organizational Committee (Galorkom) was created. In July 1920, after occupying parts of Galicia, Bolsheviks established a provisional Communist government known as Galician Revolutionary Committee (Galrevkom) headed by Volodymyr Zatonsky. In August, a separate central committee of the party was established.

Following the 1921 Treaty of Riga, Communist Party of Eastern Galicia signed an agreement with the Communist Workers' Party of Poland (CPP), according to which it was to become an autonomous part of the latter. However, actions of the party were hindered by persecution from the side of Polish authorities, as well as emergence of internal opposition, whose members refused to subordinate themselves to Polish Communists, claiming that the political status of Eastern Galicia had not been formally determined. In 1923, following the formal recognition of Eastern Galicia as part of Poland, Communist Party of Eastern Galicia was reorganized as a branch of the Communist Workers' Party of Poland, spreading its activities on Ukrainian-populated areas of Poland beyond Galicia and adopting the name "Communist Party of Western Ukraine".

=== Activities ===
Following the ban against the Ukrainian Social Democratic Party introduced by Polish authorities in 1924, many of that party's local branches came under influence of KPZU. In 1926, 151 alleged members of the Communist undergound, most of them Ukrainian peasants, but also several Jews, were put on trial in Volodymyr-Volynskyi on accusations of treason and plans to detach Ukrainian-populated lands from Poland and attach them to the USSR. According to investigation materials, they had adopted a radical National Communist ideology and established underground cells with military-style system of organization, whose members were known as "Cossacks" and formed the "Ukrainian Insurgent Union" (Ukrainian: Український повстанчий союз). 11 of the accused acknowledged their membership in the Communist Party of Western Ukraine, but refused to recognize the existence of any underground organization.

Defendants at the trial blamed authorities of employing threats of violence and physical torture during the investigation, and the process was criticized by the Communist International and Lviv-based Dilo newsaper. According to Stepan Shukhevych, who served as a lawyer during the process, members of Polish police served as witnesses and had undue influence upon the judges. In January 1927, the trial ended, with 9 defendants being condemned to life imprisonment, and more than a hundred others receiving lengthy prison terms. However, the condemned were eventually freed and deported to the Soviet Union in exchange for Bolshevik authorities liberating Poles imprisoned under their rule.

At times, the Communist Party of Western Ukraine was split into different wings, a pro-Soviet faction and a more independent one. KPZU was more influential during the NEP era in the Bolshevist Russia and the Soviet Union and the Ukrainization in the Soviet Ukraine. In 1927, most of the Central Committee of the KPZU supported the "nationalist" faction of Alexander Shumsky in the CPU(B). Consequently, Lazar Kaganovich, who was the general secretary of the CPU(B), accused the Western Ukrainian communists of treason. The KPZU split into a majority "nationalist" faction and a pro-Kaganovich minority. On 18 February 1928, the majority-KPZU led by Ivan Krilyk and Roman Turyansky was expelled from the Comintern. By the end of 1928, the KPZU (majority) disbanded itself, and its leaders who expressed regrets because of their "errors" went to the USSR, where they were later repressed. The pro-Soviet minority continued as KPZU. Its influence faded away in the 1930s because of Stalin's regime in the USSR and execution of its policies in Ukraine by Pavel Postyshev and Lazar Kaganovich.

=== Decline and dissolution ===
During the early 1930s, as a result of the adoption of a new course by Soviet authorites and beginning of anti-Ukrainian terror in the USSR, influence of KPZU further declined. Most of its prominent members who had emigrated to the Soviet Union were physically eliminated, meanwhile a large part of rank-and-file members of the party adopted nationalist positions. In 1936 KPZU's leadership was criticized by Moscow as part of a larger campaign led by the Comintern against Polish Communists.

In 1938, the Executive Committee of the Comintern decided to disband the Communist Party of Poland, together with the Communist parties of Western Belarus and Western Ukraine. This decision was sparked by accusations that the leadership of those parties had been taken over by "fascist agents". Almost all the members of the KPZU who were in the USSR at the time were repressed. Many activists who had remained in Polish-ruled Western Ukraine were repressed in 1939 after the Soviet invasion of Poland, with most of the party's former members being arrested.

Following Stalin's death, KPZU was rehabilitated, however that decision did not concern the party's National Communist members. The decision to disband the party was officially recognized to have been "unsubstantiated" and based upon "materials fabricated by eventually uncovered provocateurs".

== Organization ==
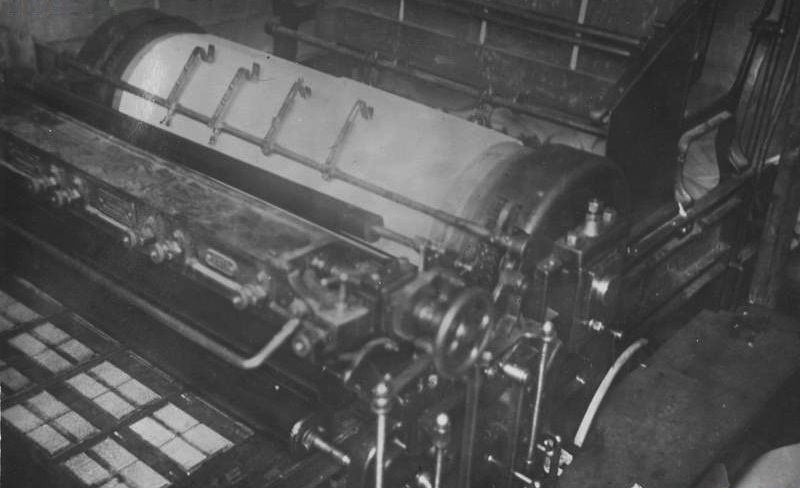
An illegal printing machine confiscated from KPZU activists in 1931

From the point of view of Polish authorities, KPZU was an illegal organization. Along with Ukrainians, its membership also included a number of ethnic Poles and Jews residing in Ukrainian-majority areas. Throughout its history, KPZU held a number of congresses and conferences, and was represented in the Communist International. Among KPZU's offshoot organizations was the Peasant Social Union (Selrob), which had a legal status, and until 1927 it also had its members in several cultural and student organizations. The party operated its own branches of Komsomol, MOPR and in 1921-1934 published the weekly newspaper Nasha Pravda ("Our Truth") issued in Berlin and Vienna. The party cooperated with numerous newspapers and magazines, including the journal Novi Shliakhy ("New Ways") edited by Antin Krushelnytskyi.

== See also ==
- Ukrainian interbrigade company Taras Shevchenko
- Communist Party of Poland
- Communist Party of Western Belorussia
