= List of International Brigades personnel =

This is a partial list of International Brigades personnel in the Spanish Civil War

The brigades were military units set up by the Communist International consisting of foreign volunteers to the Republican cause. It is estimated that during the entire war, between 40,000 and 59,000 members served in the International Brigades, including 15,000 who died in combat. Not all foreign volunteers served in the Brigades, those who were anti-Stalinist such as George Orwell joined other Republican units.

== A ==
- William Aalto – Joined Abraham Lincoln Brigade in 1937. Fought at Battle of Teruel and in special operations.
- Anton Ackermann – Leader of the Political School of the International Brigades.
- Madge Addy – Nurse with the International Brigades.
- Bill Alexander – Political commissar of British Anti-Tank Battery, British Battalion. Became commander of British Battalion in December 1937 Took part in the Battle of Belchite (1937) and was promoted to captain after the Battle of Teruel.
- Celestino Alfonso – Machine-gunner and political commissar.
- Todor Angelov – Served in the Dimitrov Battalion.
- Akseli Anttila
- Alberto Assa
- Shimon Avidan

== B ==
- Shapour Bakhtiar
- Ralph Bates – Swindon, England. Founded the XV International Brigade's newspaper, The Volunteer for Liberty.
- Hans Beimler
- Delmer Berg
- Alvah Bessie
- Norman Bethune
- Len Beurton
- Geoffrey Bing
- Milan Blagojević Španac
- Joseph Boczov
- Petre Borilă
- Herman Bottcher
- John Edward Boulting
- Willy Brandt
- Clive Branson
- Willi Bredel
- Moisès Broggi
- George Brown – Killed at Villanueva de la Cañada in the Battle of Brunete, 6 July 1937.
- Felicia Browne – Killed in Aragon, 28 August 1936.
- Kurt Bürger
- Ernst Busch

== C ==
- Edward A. Carter Jr. – American. Abraham Lincoln Brigade
- Christopher Caudwell
- Alfred Chakin
- Kazimierz Cichowski
- Lewis Clive – Killed at Hill 481, in the Siege of Gandesa, 1 August 1938.
- Claud Cockburn – Daily Worker correspondent for the Spanish Civil War.
- Archie Cochrane
- Milan Ćopić
- Fred Copeman
- Vladimir Ćopić
- John Cornford – Cambridge, England. Killed in the Battle of Lopera, 28 December 1936.
- Nicolae Cristea
- David Crook
- Nigel Cullen
- Jock Cunningham

== D ==
- Peter Daly – Enniscorthy, Ireland. Wounded at the Battle of Belchite, died in hospital, 6 September 1937.
- Georgi Damyanov
- Peko Dapčević
- Carmelo Delgado Delgado – Puerto Rico
- Charlie Donnelly – Dungannon, Northern Ireland. Killed in the Battle of Jarama, 27 February 1937.
- Jules Dumont

== F ==
- Ralph Winston Fox – Yorkshire, England. Died in service, 28 December 1936.

== G ==
- János Gálicz
- Ermenegildo Gasperoni
- Pierre Georges
- Irving Goff
- David Guest

== H ==
- Hallgrímur Hallgrímsson – Iceland.
- Milton Herndon – USA. Section leader in the Mackenzie–Papineau Battalion. Killed in action in Fuentes de Ebro, October 13, 1937.
- Robert Hilliard – Killarney, Ireland. Died in service, February 1937.
- Otakar Hromádko
- Gopal Mukund Huddar – Indian anti-colonial activist who joined the International Brigades in 1937.

== J ==
- Fernanda Jacobsen
- Jack Jones
- James Robertson Justice
- Žikica Jovanović Španac

== K ==
- Hans Kahle
- Salaria Kea – USA
- Ali Kelmendi – Kosovo/Albania. Garibaldi International Brigade.
- Peter Kerrigan
- Bernard Knox
- František Kriegel
- Dušan Kveder

== L ==
- Arthur H. Landis
- Jef Last
- Oliver Law
- Laurie Lee
- Tuure Lehén
- Maurice Levitas – Dublin, Ireland.
- Yank Levy
- Luigi Longo
- Karlo Lukanov

== M ==
- Petro Marko
- André Marty
- Carl Marzani – Rome, Italy.
- Matti Mattson
- Robert Hale Merriman
- Erich Mielke
- Ewart Milne – Dublin, Ireland. Ambulance driver.
- Fred Mulders
- Ferenc Münnich – Hungary. Rakosi Battalion, political commissar

== N ==
- Conlon Nancarrow
- George Nathan
- Steve Nelson
- Pietro Nenni
- Guido Nonveiller

== O ==
- Paddy O'Daire – County Donegal, Ireland.
- Abraham Osheroff

== P ==
- Randolfo Pacciardi
- Jules Paivio
- Ezekias Papaioannou
- Wogan Philipps – United Kingdom. Ambulance driver and logistics financier of the International Brigades.

== R ==
- László Rajk – Hungary. Rakosi Battalion, political commissar
- Pramod Ranjan Sengupta
- Heinrich Rau
- Gustav Regler
- Ludwig Renn
- Edwin Rolfe
- Henri Rol-Tanguy
- Valter Roman
- Esmond Romilly
- Angelo Rossi
- Franc Rozman
- Frank Ryan – County Limerick, Ireland.

== S ==
- Elman Service
- Thora Silverthorne – Abertillery, Wales. Chief nurse of the first foreign hospital created in Spain to aid the International Brigades.
- Humphrey (Hugh) Slater
- John Sommerfield
- Manfred Stern
- Karol Świerczewski

== V ==
- Asim Vokshi

== W ==
- Alec Wainman- Yorkshire, England. Ambulance driver and propagandist for the Second Spanish Republic.
- Tom Wintringham – Grimsby, Lincolnshire. Commander of the British Battalion of the International Brigades.
- Milton Wolff

== Z ==
- Wilhelm Zaisser
- Máté Zalka
