= Philip Detro =

American writer (1911–1938)

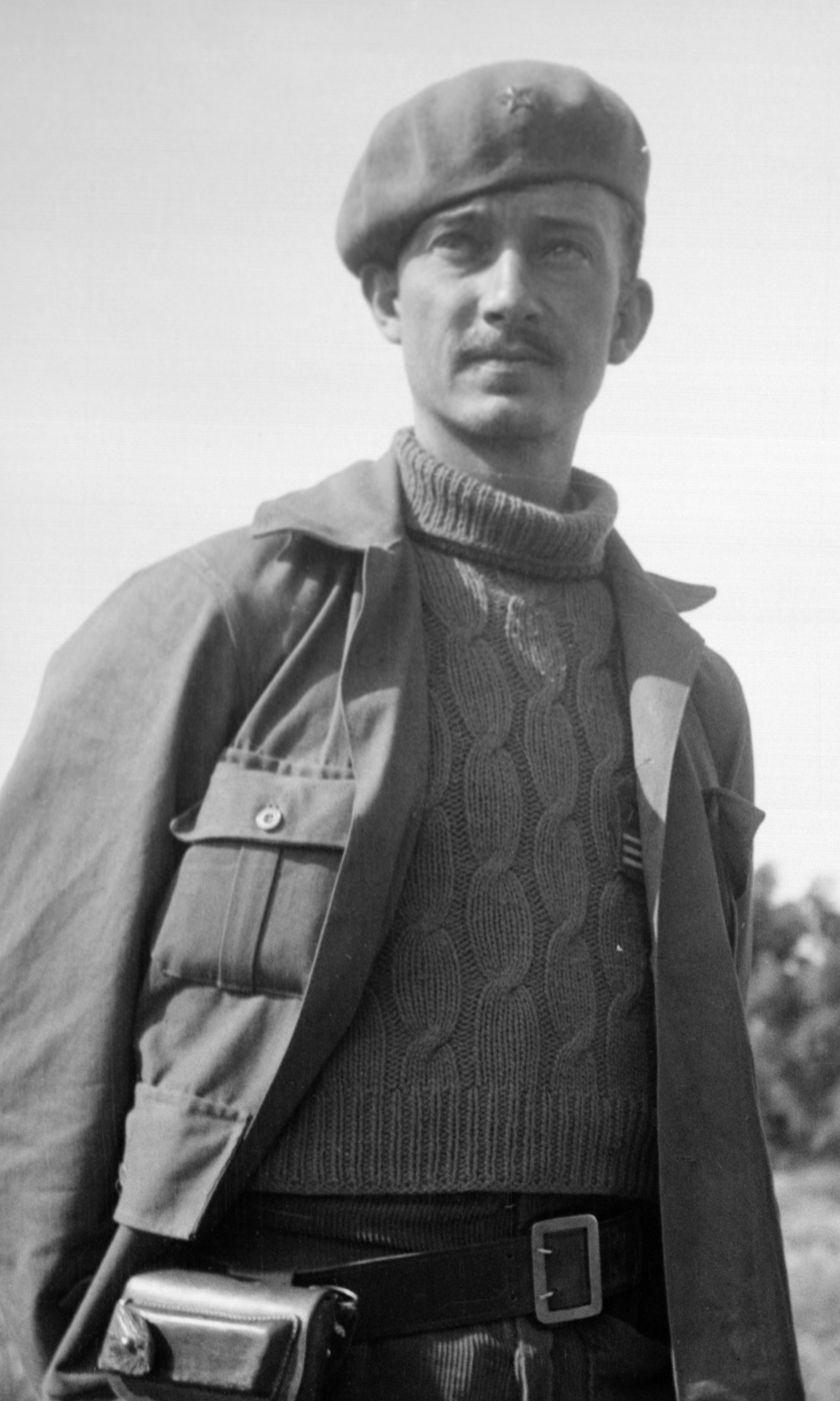
- Detro in 1937
- Born: May 17, 1911; Conroe, Texas, U.S.
- Died: April 10, 1938 (aged 26); Murcia, Spain
- Military career
- Allegiance: United States; Spanish Republic
- Branch: United States National Guard; International Brigades
- Service years: 1937–1938
- Rank: Battalion Commander
- Units: Texas National Guard; The "Abraham Lincoln" XV International Brigade
- Commands: Lincoln Battalion
- Conflicts: Spanish Civil War; Battle of Brunete (WIA); Battle of Belchite; Battle of Fuentes de Ebro; Battle of Teruel (WIA)
- Education: Rice University; University of Missouri
- Political party: Democratic

Philip Leighton Detro (May 17, 1911 – April 10, 1938) was an American writer, poet, and sailor who fought for the Republicans in the Spanish Civil War as a member of the Abraham Lincoln Brigade. He served as commander of the Lincoln Battalion during the battles of Fuentes de Ebro and Teruel.

== Early life ==
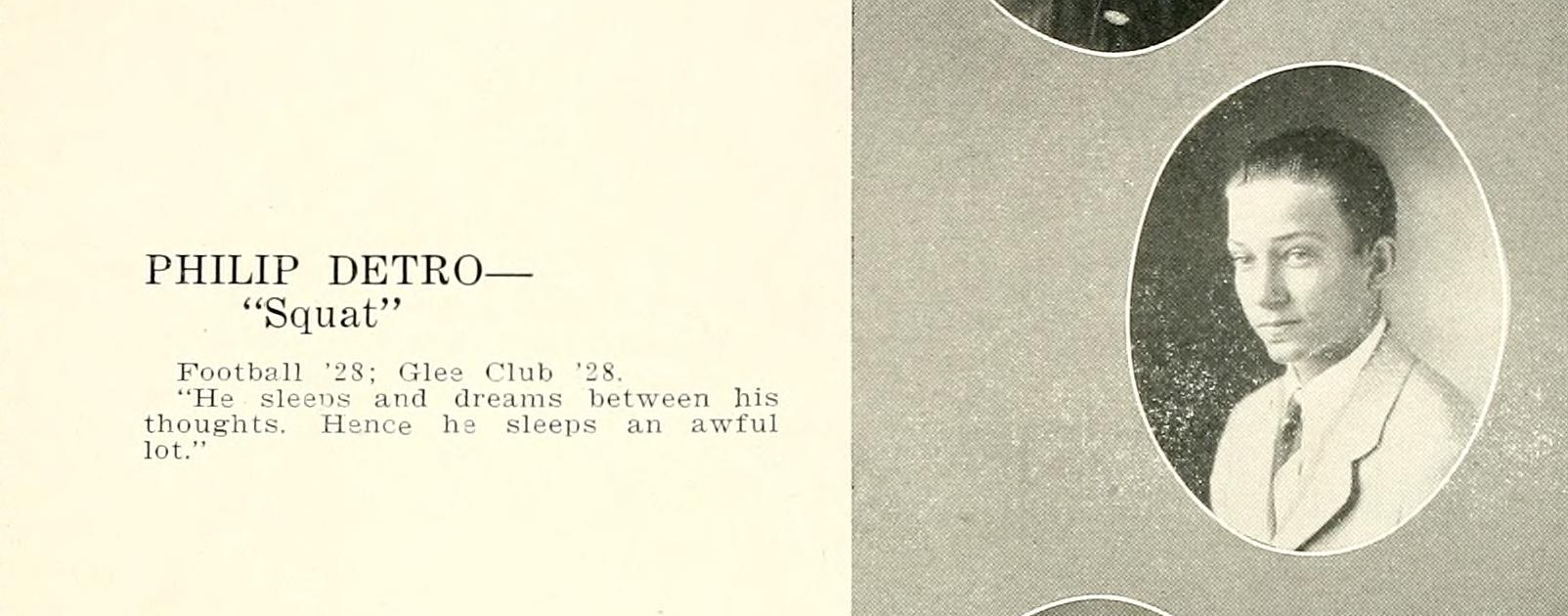
Detro in the Conroe High School yearbook, 1928

Philip Detro was born in Conroe, Texas on May 17, 1911. He graduated from Conroe High School in 1928 and studied at Rice University before dropping out to become a merchant seaman. In 1932, he traveled to Germany where, after hearing a speech by Adolf Hitler, he decided to become an anti-fascist.

Two years later, he decided to become a writer and enrolled in a journalism program at the University of Missouri. He also studied Spanish and creative writing. A year later, he was expelled from the university for having 77 absences. He then moved to New York City, where he worked for a writers' union and devoted himself to writing.

== Spanish Civil War ==
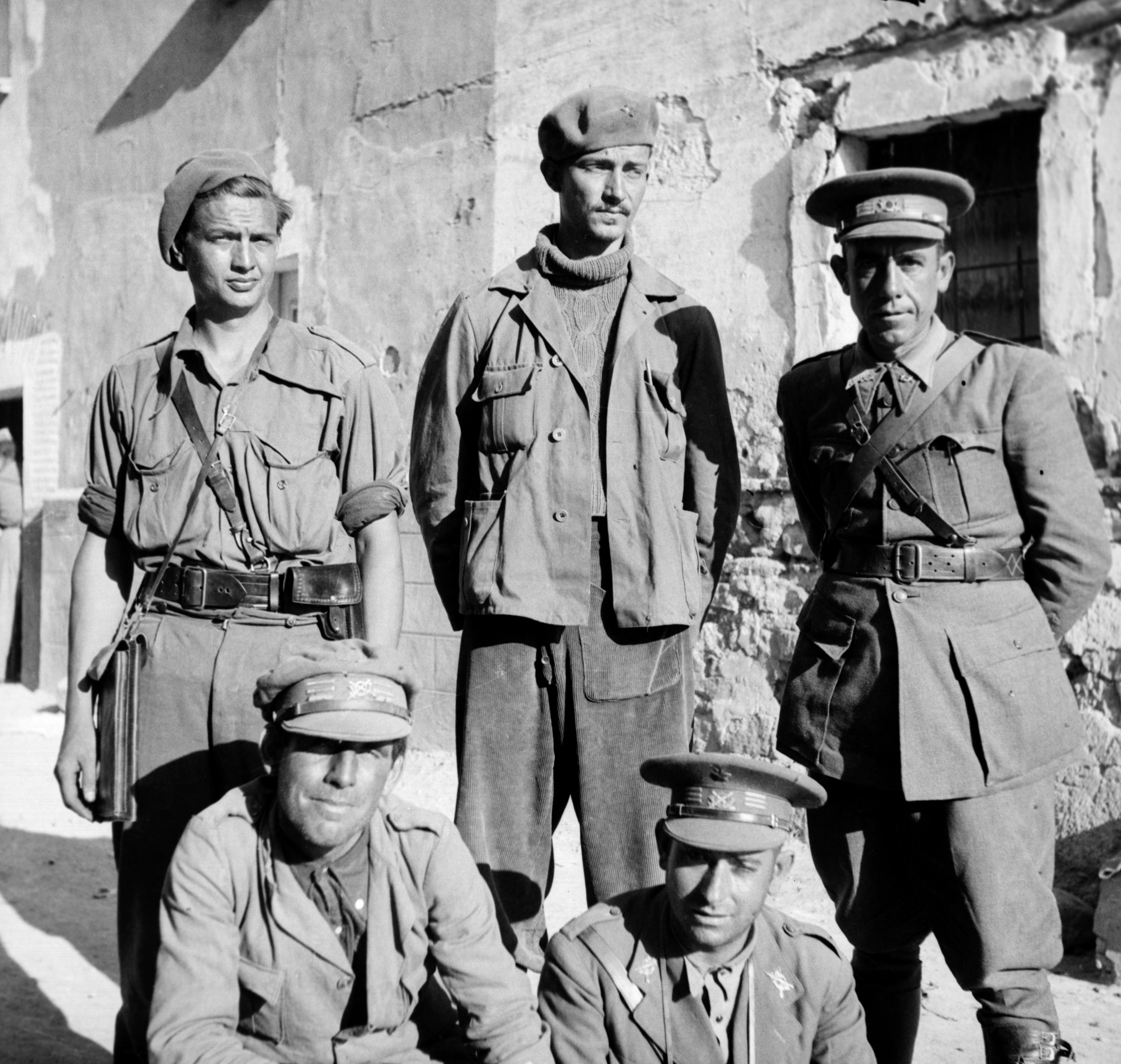
XV International Brigade Commanders, October 1937. Standing (L-R): Robert G. Thompson (Mackenzie–Papineau), Philip Detro (Lincoln-Washington), Garcia (24th). Seated: Paddy O'Daire (British), Aguila (24th).

When the Spanish Civil War broke out, Detro tried to volunteer for the Abraham Lincoln Battalion to defend the Second Spanish Republic; but the Communist Party initially rejected him for not being a member. He was later admitted (thanks in part to his experience in the Texas National Guard) along with about twenty other volunteers. Upon joining, when asked his political affiliation, he replied: "Democrat." He was an admirer of President Franklin D. Roosevelt, despite the latter withholding aid to the Republicans. Once in Spain, Detro met an American nurse named Lenora Temple with whom he was romantically involved.

In Tarazona, he commanded a squadron. In Brunete, he took charge of Hans Amlie's company after the latter was wounded, and led them to Mosquito Hill, where he himself was wounded. After recovering, he participated in the Battle of Belchite, at the end of which he became battalion commander.

== Death and legacy ==
Detro was wounded by a sniper in Teruel on January 19, 1938. He had been trying to cross the street between two positions without using a shallow communications trench that he saw as unsafe. He was transferred to the hospital at Murcia, where he died of sepsis on April 10, 1938. He was buried in town.

Detro's men remembered him for his sense of humor. He liked to remind his political commissar, Fred Keller: "Where I come from, we shoot Communists."
