= Peter Daly (Irish republican) =

Irish Socialist and Republican (1903–1937)

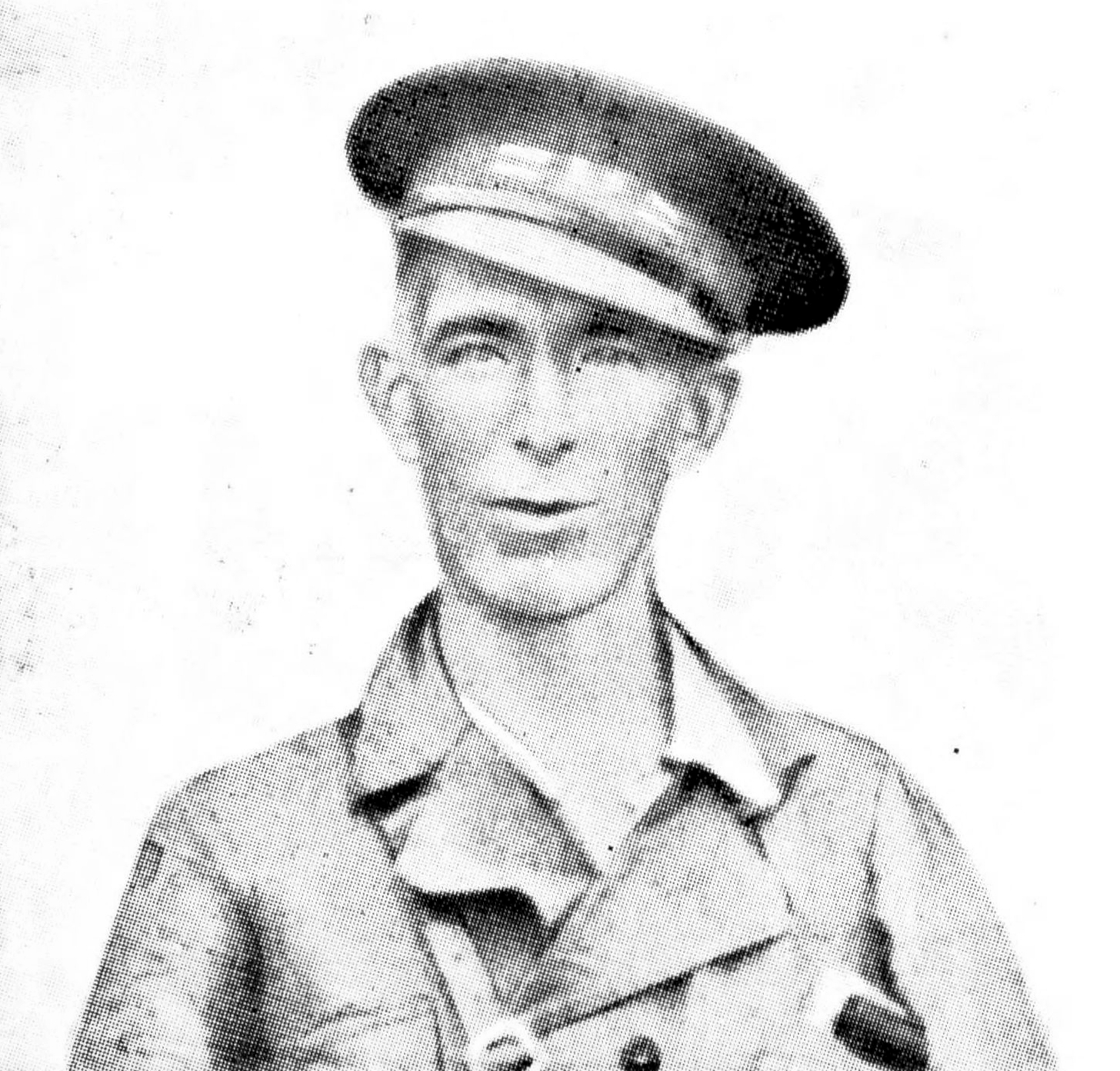
- Daly in Spain, 1937
- Born: 27 September 1903; Liverpool, England
- Died: 5 September 1937 (aged 33); Benicassim Hospital, Valencia, Spain
- Military career
- Allegiance: Irish Republic; Second Spanish Republic
- Branch: Anti-Treaty IRA; British Army; International Brigades
- Rank: Lieutenant
- Unit: Connolly Column
- Conflicts: Irish Civil War; Spanish Civil War

Peter Daly (27 September 1903 – 5 September 1937) was an Irish socialist and republican who fought in the Irish War of Independence as well as serving as a volunteer in the Spanish Civil War, where he died serving with the International Brigades.

== Early life ==
Peter Daly was born in Liverpool on 27 September 1903 to Irish immigrants. His family returned to County Wexford at the end of 1911, to the village of Monageer near Enniscorthy. Lar Daly, Peter's father, had been a founder of the Tom Clarke Society in Liverpool as well as a member of the Irish Republican Brotherhood. The influence of his father encouraged Peter to pursue his own Republican agenda, starting in his youth when he joined Na Fianna Éireann. This affiliation lead him to join the Anti-Treaty forces during the Irish Civil War, in which he was later captured and imprisoned for 17 months before being released after an 18-day hunger strike.

Following the civil war, Daly departed to England where after a stint of working odd jobs, he eventually joined the British army in 1926. Daly served for 4 years and reached the rank of Sergeant before being dishonourably discharged (in his absence) after it became apparent that he was smuggling small arms back to Ireland.

Following his return to Ireland, Daly became a training officer to local IRA units based in Wexford. By 1934 he had joined fellow left-wing militants in the Republican Congress, a Socialist and Republican organisation that featured the likes of Peadar O'Donnell, Frank Ryan and Michael O'Riordan. In 1936 civil war had broken out in Spain and the members of the Republican Congress became avid supporters of the Republican side of the conflict. Incensed by support for the Fascist forces in other parts of Irish society, particularly the support coming from Eoin O'Duffy's Blueshirts, the Congress was determined to send volunteers to the war just as the Blueshirts were doing. Amongst the Socialist volunteers would be Daly.

== Spanish Civil War ==
Daly and his fellow Irish volunteers would eventually be placed in the Connolly Column, part of the Lincoln Battalion of the XV International Brigade and saw action beginning in 1937. He served as a section leader and company commander in the 20th Anglo-American Battalion of the 86th Mixed Brigade formed in March 1937. Because of his previous experience in both the Irish civil war and as part of the British army, Daly was used as an officer, rising quickly through the ranks, becoming a Captain after the Battle of Brunete. His was 'a popular appointment'. Daly and his comrades would see action in the Battle of Pozoblanco as well as at Guernica before taking part in the Battle of Jarama and then fighting in the Aragon Offensive.

In late August 1937, Daly took part in the Battle of Belchite. Daly's unit was tasked with capturing the town of Quinto. As part of their orders, they were commanded on 25 August to capture Purburrel Hill, a height south of the town, on which 500 Rebel troops were entrenched behind barbed wire and concrete pill-boxes, fortified with input from German advisors. Finding themselves unsupported and outnumbered against the defenders, Daly's unit took heavy casualties and he was wounded in the abdomen. Daly was taken away for aid while his second in command, Paddy O'Daire took charge refusing the orders of his superior, Lieutenant Colonel Vladimir Ćopić, to continue the suicidal attack, keeping his men dug in on the exposed hillside until nightfall and safe withdrawal. On 26 August O'Daire, this time supported by the XV International Brigade's anti-tank battery, succeeded in breaking the enemy lines, leading to the capture of 300 troops. Daly was transferred to Benicassim Hospital near Valencia, however by 5 September 1937 he was overcome by his wounds and died.

There is a memorial in his home village of Monageer commemorating his life and struggle.

== See also ==
- Irish socialist volunteers in the Spanish Civil War
