= Paddy O'Daire =

Irish soldier and activist

Patrick O'Daire
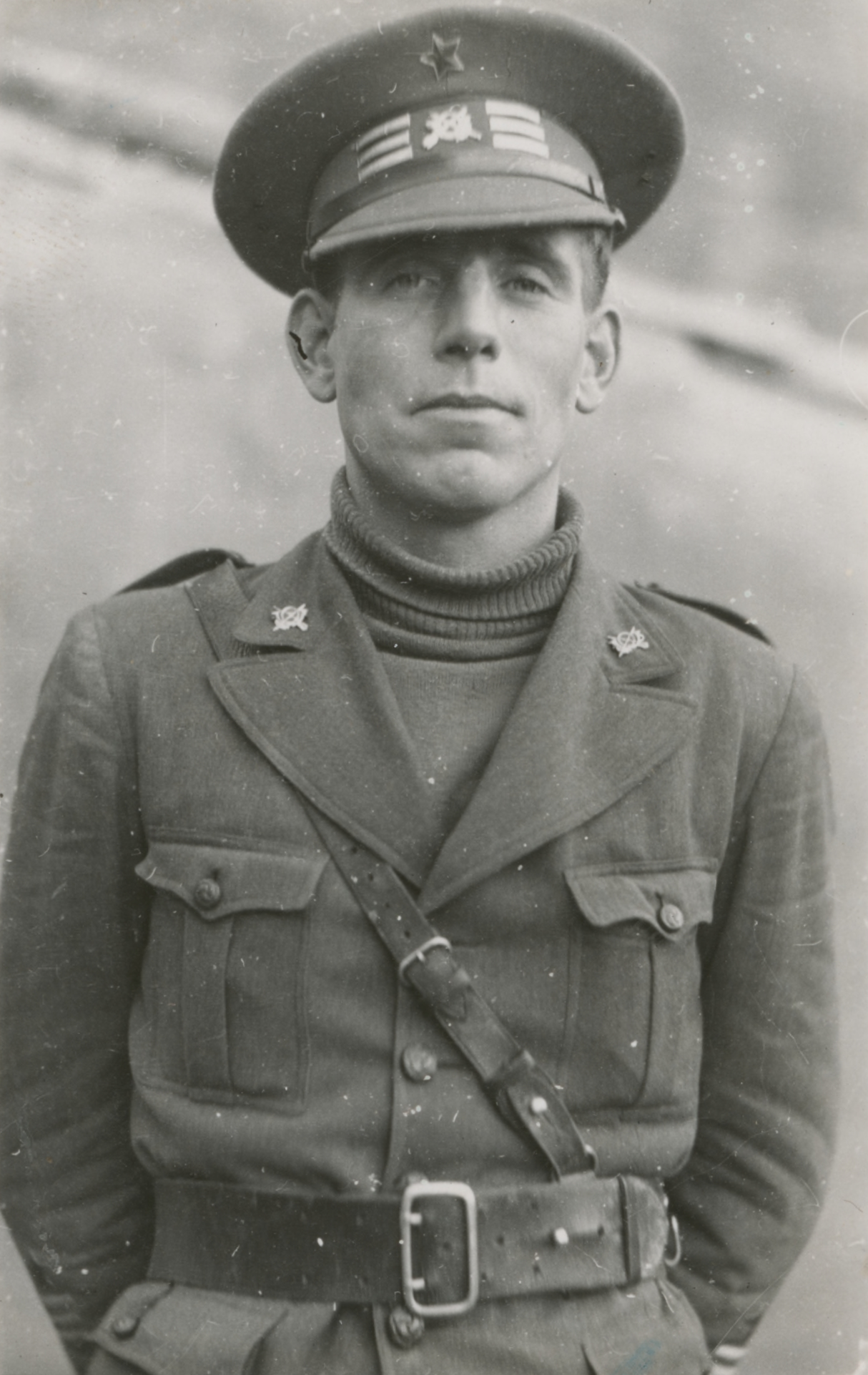
- O'Daire in Spain, 1937
- Born: 22 May 1905; Glenties, County Donegal, Ireland
- Died: 12 November 1981 (aged 76); Llanberis, Wales
- Military career
- Allegiance: Irish Free State; Spanish Republic; United Kingdom
- Branch: Irish Republican Army; National Army; International Brigades; British Army
- Rank: Sergeant; Lieutenant; Major
- Nickname: Paddy
- Units: Lincoln Battalion; British Battalion; Royal Pioneer Corps
- Commands: British Battalion
- Conflicts: Irish War of Independence; Irish Civil War; Spanish Civil War; World War II

Patrick O'Daire (22 May 1905 – 12 November 1981) was an Irish soldier and activist who fought in the Irish War of Independence, the Irish Civil War, the Spanish Civil War with the XV International Brigade, and in World War II as part of Royal Pioneer Corps of the British Army.

== Early life ==
O'Daire was born in Glenties, County Donegal, Ireland in 1905. As a teenager, he fought in the Irish War of Independence with the Irish Republican Army and was later an officer in the National Army, the army of the newly created Irish Free State. He remained in the National Army until August 1929 when he immigrated to Saskatoon, Saskatchewan, Canada. O'Daire had been lured to Canada on a government scheme which offered ownership of land to immigrants, provided they were able to make it arable. O'Daire worked for a year clearing land but by the time his land was ready to farm, the Great Depression had hit and he was unable to start his farm. A disgruntled O'Daire began agitating against the Canadian government and began helping to organise labour protests. His military experience lead the authorities to consider him a dangerous threat and by 1933 O'Daire found himself arrested and imprisoned on charges of provoking a riot in Saskatchewan. O'Daire served 15 months doing hard labour in a Canadian prison before being deported to Liverpool, England in 1934. O'Daire joined the Communist Party of Great Britain that same year.

== Spanish Civil War ==
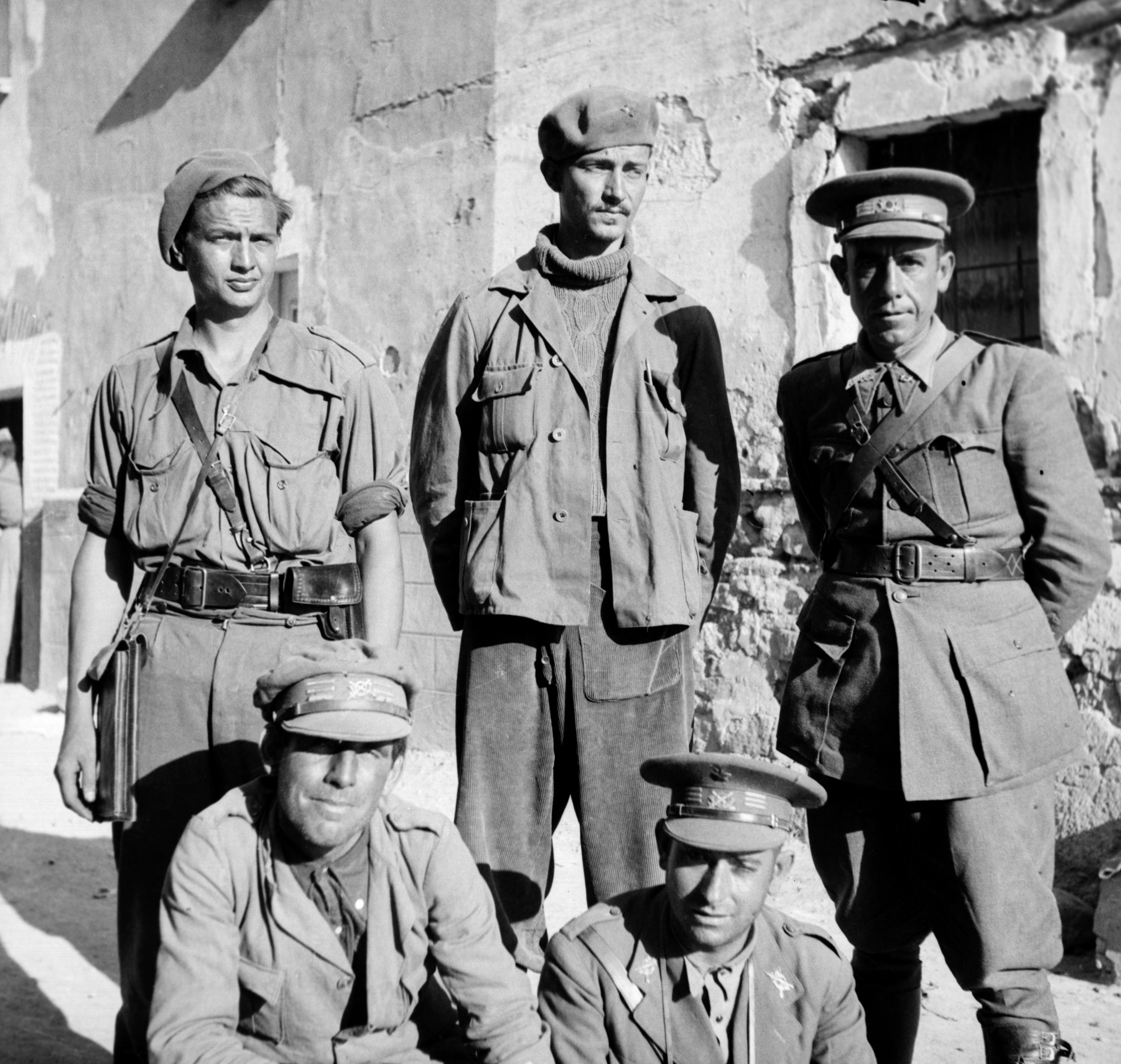
XV International Brigade Commanders, October 1937. Standing (L-R): Robert G. Thompson (Mackenzie–Papineau), Philip Detro (Lincoln-Washington), Garcia (24th). Seated: Paddy O'Daire (British), Aguila (24th).

In December 1936, O'Daire went to Spain and volunteered to defend the Second Spanish Republic during the Spanish Civil War, serving with the International Brigades, army units made up of foreign volunteers.

O'Daire and his fellow Irish volunteers would eventually be placed in the Connolly Column, part of the Lincoln Battalion and the British Battalion at different points, and saw action beginning in 1937. Because of his previous experience in both the Irish war of independence and the civil war, O'Daire was used as an officer. O'Daire served as second-in-command to Peter Daly. O'Daire was wounded early on, getting hit in Lopera near Córdoba in December 1936, but was able to recover reasonably quickly. The Irish would see action in the Battle of Pozoblanco as well as at Guernica before taking part in the Battle of Jarama and then fighting in the Aragon Offensive.

In late August 1937, O'Daire took part in the Battle of Belchite. O'Daire's unit was tasked with capturing the town of Quinto. As part of their orders, they were commanded on 25 August to capture Purburrel Hill, a height south of the town, on which 500 Rebel troops were entrenched behind barbed wire and concrete pill-boxes, fortified with input from German advisors. Finding themselves unsupported and outnumbered against the defenders, O'Daire's unit took heavy casualties and Peter Daly was wounded in the abdomen. Daly was taken away for aid while O’Daire took charge refusing the orders of his superior, Lieutenant Colonel Vladimir Ćopić, to continue the suicidal attack, keeping his men dug in on the exposed hillside until nightfall and safe withdrawal. On 26 August O'Daire, this time supported by the 15th Brigade's anti-tank battery, succeeded in breaking the enemy lines, leading to the capture of 300 troops. Daly was transferred to Benicassim Hospital near Valencia, however by 5 September 1937 he was overcome by his wounds and died. Subsequently, O'Daire took over his command of the British Battalion. In 1938 O'Daire became director of operations of the XV International Brigade.

== World War II ==
During the Second World War, O'Daire signed up as a private to the British Army. He would eventually reach the rank of Major while serving with the Royal Pioneer Corps, fighting in Italy.

== Later years ==
After the war, he lived in Coventry for many years, before finally setting up home in Llanberis, Wales. He died in 1981.
