= Robert Hale Merriman =

American academic and soldier (1908–1938)

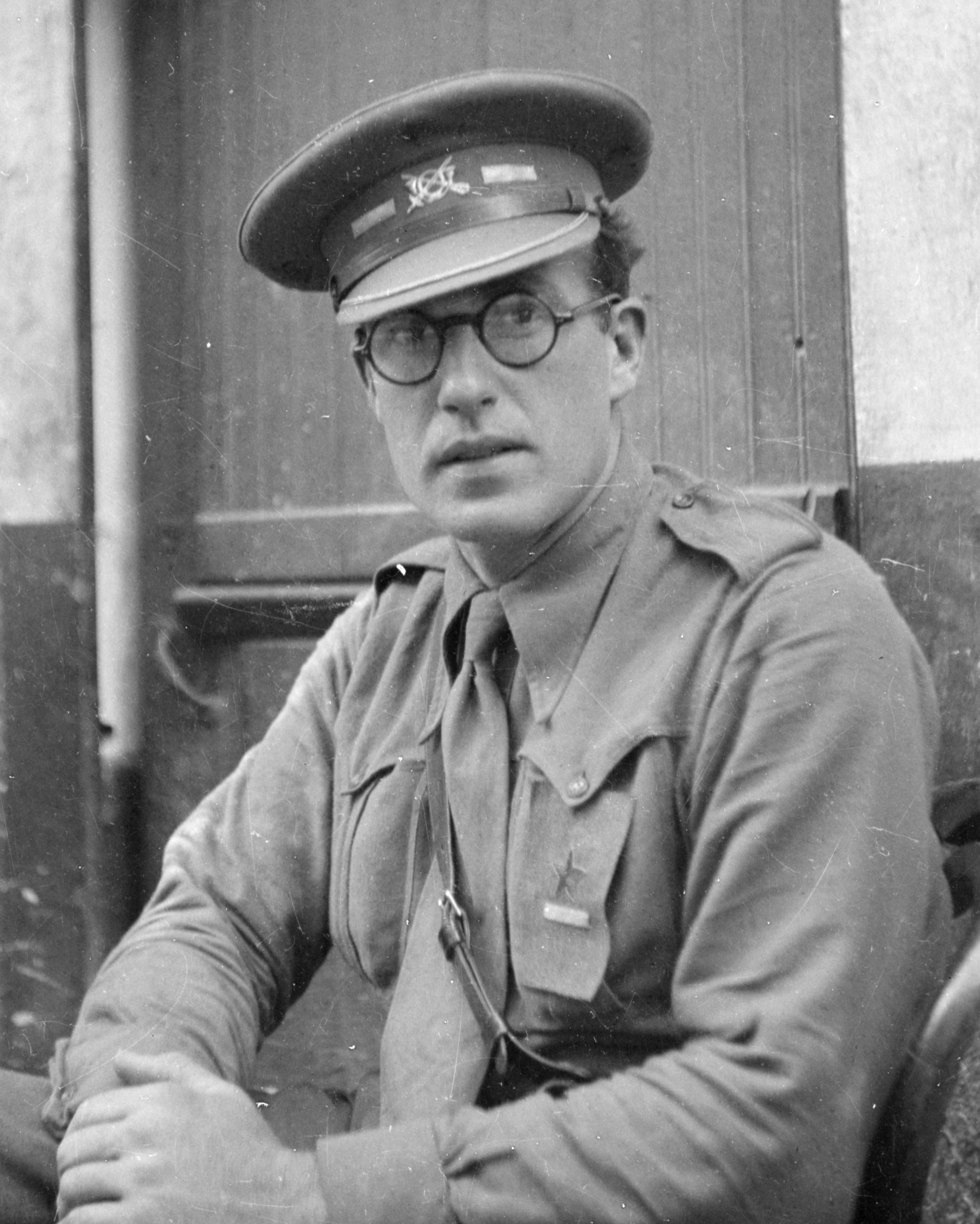
- Merriman in 1937
- Born: November 17, 1908; Eureka, California, U.S.
- Died: April 2, 1938 (aged 29); Gandesa, Spain
- Cause of death: Killed in action or executed
- Spouse: Marion Stone
- Military career
- Allegiance: Spanish Republic
- Branch: International Brigades
- Rank: Brigade Chief of Staff
- Unit: The "Abraham Lincoln" XV International Brigade
- Commands: Lincoln Battalion; The "Abraham Lincoln" XV International Brigade
- Conflicts: Spanish Civil War; Battle of Jarama (WIA); Battle of Brunete; Battle of Gandesa †
- Education: University of Nevada, Reno; University of California, Berkeley
- Employer: University of California, Berkeley
- Political party: Communist Party USA

Robert Hale Merriman (November 17, 1908 – c. April 2, 1938) was an American doctoral student who fought with the Republican forces in Spain during the Spanish Civil War. He was killed while commanding the Abraham Lincoln Battalion of the International Brigades.

== Early years ==
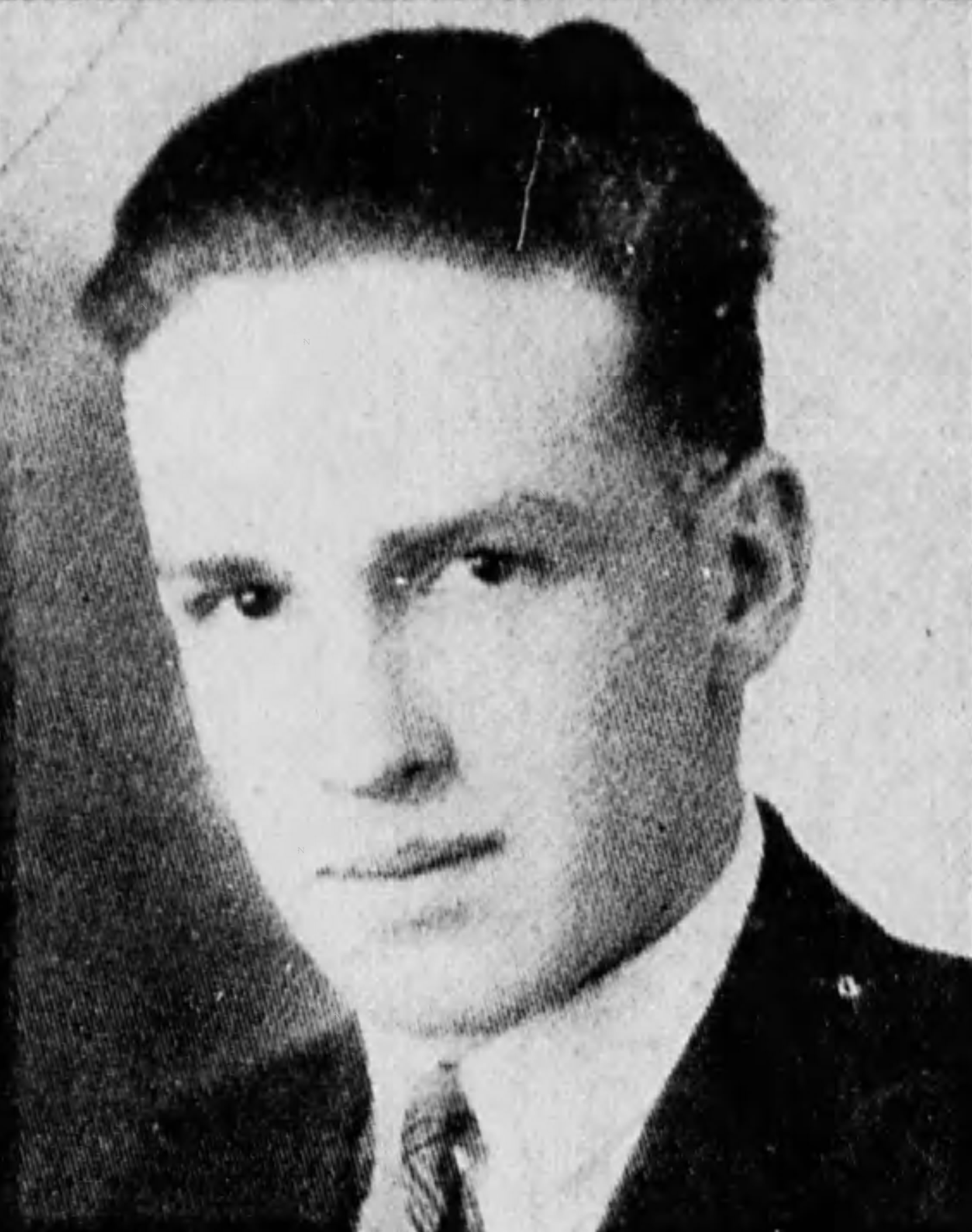
Merriman's Santa Cruz High School yearbook photo, 1925

Merriman was born in Eureka, California, the son of a lumberjack. He grew up in Santa Cruz, and attended Santa Cruz High School, where he managed the yearbook, led the football cheer squad, and represented the debate team in the state debate championship. He graduated from the University of Nevada, Reno in 1932 before undertaking graduate work at the University of California, Berkeley. Around this time, he joined the Communist Party USA.

In the summer of 1936, the Merrimans toured Central Europe, and a stay in Vienna gave them a sobering firsthand view of Nazism. At about the same time, the Spanish Civil War broke out, and after returning to Moscow, Merriman became convinced that defeating the fascists in Spain and then Germany would prevent a second World War. Against his wife's wishes and the advice of their friends, he left for Spain before his scholarship year was up to volunteer with the Republican side. His wife temporarily remained in Moscow.

== Spain ==
=== Combat ===
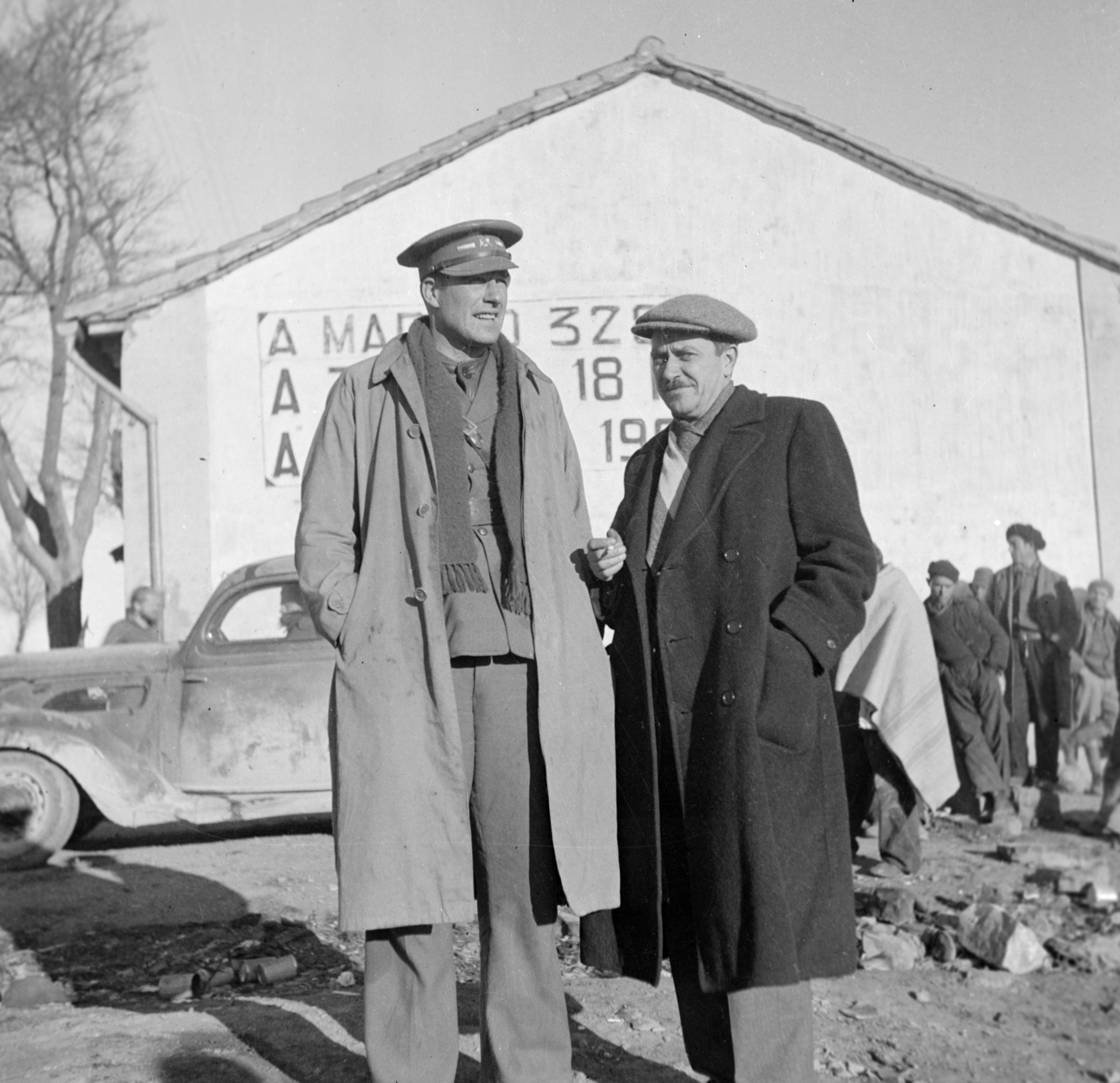
Merriman meets with Communist Party USA General Secretary Earl Browder, February 1938

Soon after his arrival in Spain on January 11, 1937, Merriman found his way to the town of Albacete, location of the headquarters and training bases for the Republican International Brigades, and was quickly accepted into the XV International Brigade. Also on January 11, he began keeping a diary, which he maintained until November 1, 1937.

The Lincoln Battalion first saw action at the Battle of Jarama (6–27 February 1937). Their role was to prevent Nationalist forces taking the main Madrid-Valencia road. The Lincolns took appalling casualties, particularly in the assault of Pingarrón, which became known as Suicide Hill.

Following Jarama, he was promoted to major and appointed chief of staff for the XVth Brigade. While recovering from his wounds, he spent his time organizing and training the International Brigades.

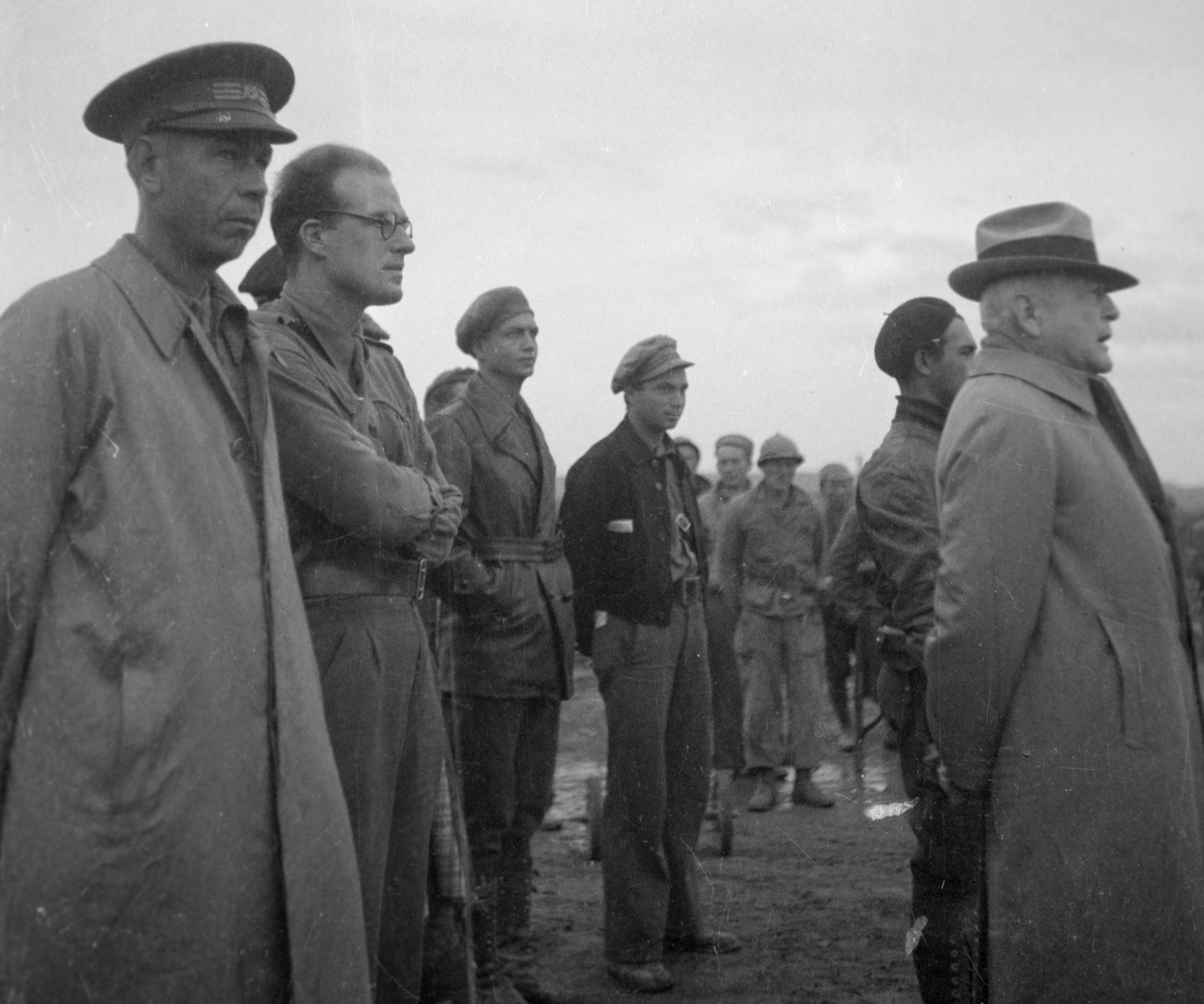
Stephen O. Fuqua, U.S. military attaché in Spain (far right), observes the Abraham Lincoln Brigade alongside commander Merriman (second from left) in Quinto, October 1937

The depleted Lincolns, together with the depleted British Battalion and a second understrength American battalion (the George Washington Battalion), were reorganized into a regiment commanded by Briton Jock Cunningham. A second regiment of the XV International Brigade was composed of remnants of the Dimitrov Battalion and Sixth February Battalion and a Spanish battalion (Volontario 24). The two regiments next fought in the Battle of Brunete (July 1937), and again suffered appalling losses. Of the 2,500 men of the XV who went into the battle, only 1,000 effective soldiers remained.

=== Death ===
Merriman took charge of a mixture of elements including the brigade staff and remnants of the Lincoln-Washington Battalion and the XI International Brigade. On the night of April 1, they retreated to a hill just outside the town of Gandesa. On the day of April 2, they attacked the Nationalist forces in Gandesa in an attempt to break through in the direction of Corbera d'Ebre to Republican lines, but were repulsed. The survivors were forced to return to the hill. On the night of April 2, Merriman led another attempt to break through Nationalist lines, this time via a cattle trail. The men formed a column and began filing towards Corbera, but in the dark they lost contact and the column fragmented into smaller groups. A group including Merriman, brigade commissar David Doran, Lieutenant Edgar James Cody, John (Ivan) Gerlach and Joe Brandt inadvertently stumbled into a Nationalist encampment. Gerlach and Brandt later stated they heard gun shots and the order in Spanish, “Manos arriba!” (Hands Up!). The group scattered. Gerlach and Brandt bolted forward and eventually escaped to Republican lines; others fled back in the direction from which they came. Precisely what happened next to Merriman is unknown, but he, Doran, Cody and others apparently blundered further into the encampment and were either killed then or executed after being captured. Their remains were never found.

== Legacy ==
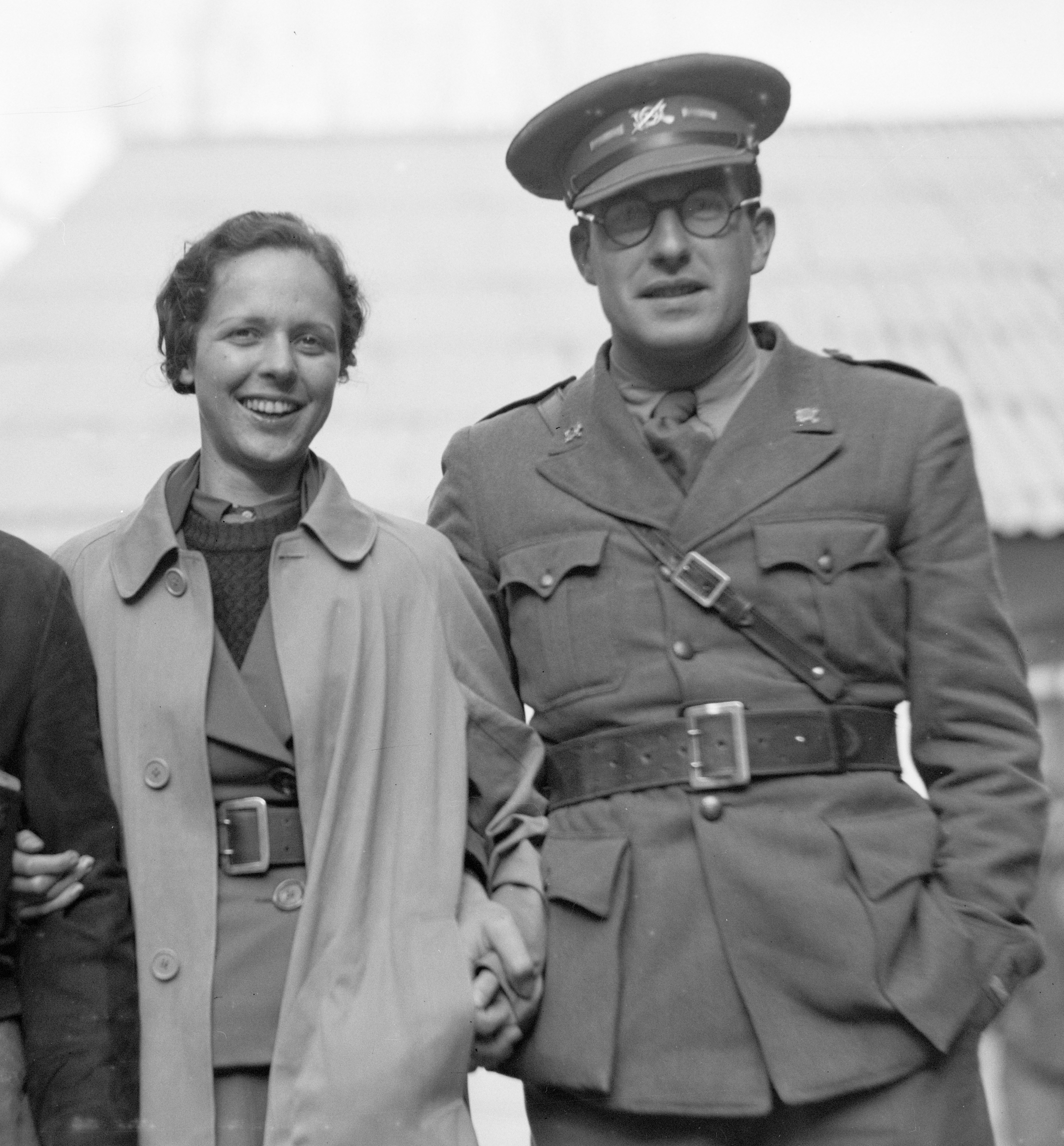
Merriman with his wife Marion Stone in Ambite, Spain, November 1937

For some time after his death there were conflicting reports, some claiming that he was alive and being held by fascist forces, some claiming that he had been killed. At first, Merriman's family was led to believe he was safe. Appeals were made urging the U.S. State Department to press for his release, including a petition from UC Berkeley professors and UC President Robert Gordon Sproul. On April 13, there was news that he had "miraculously escaped death or capture". But his wife never heard from him after March, and she and others eventually came to believe he died in the retreat.

The 6'4" Merriman is believed to have been the inspiration for Robert Jordan in Ernest Hemingway's For Whom the Bell Tolls. Merriman and Hemingway briefly met in Madrid, and Hemingway was "deeply impressed" with the young idealist.

== University of Nevada, Reno Artemisia gallery ==
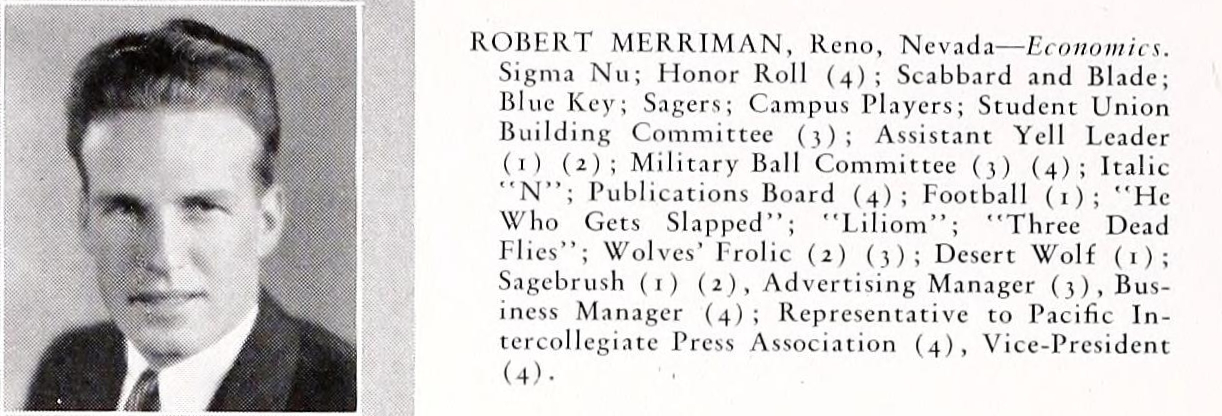
Profile, 1932

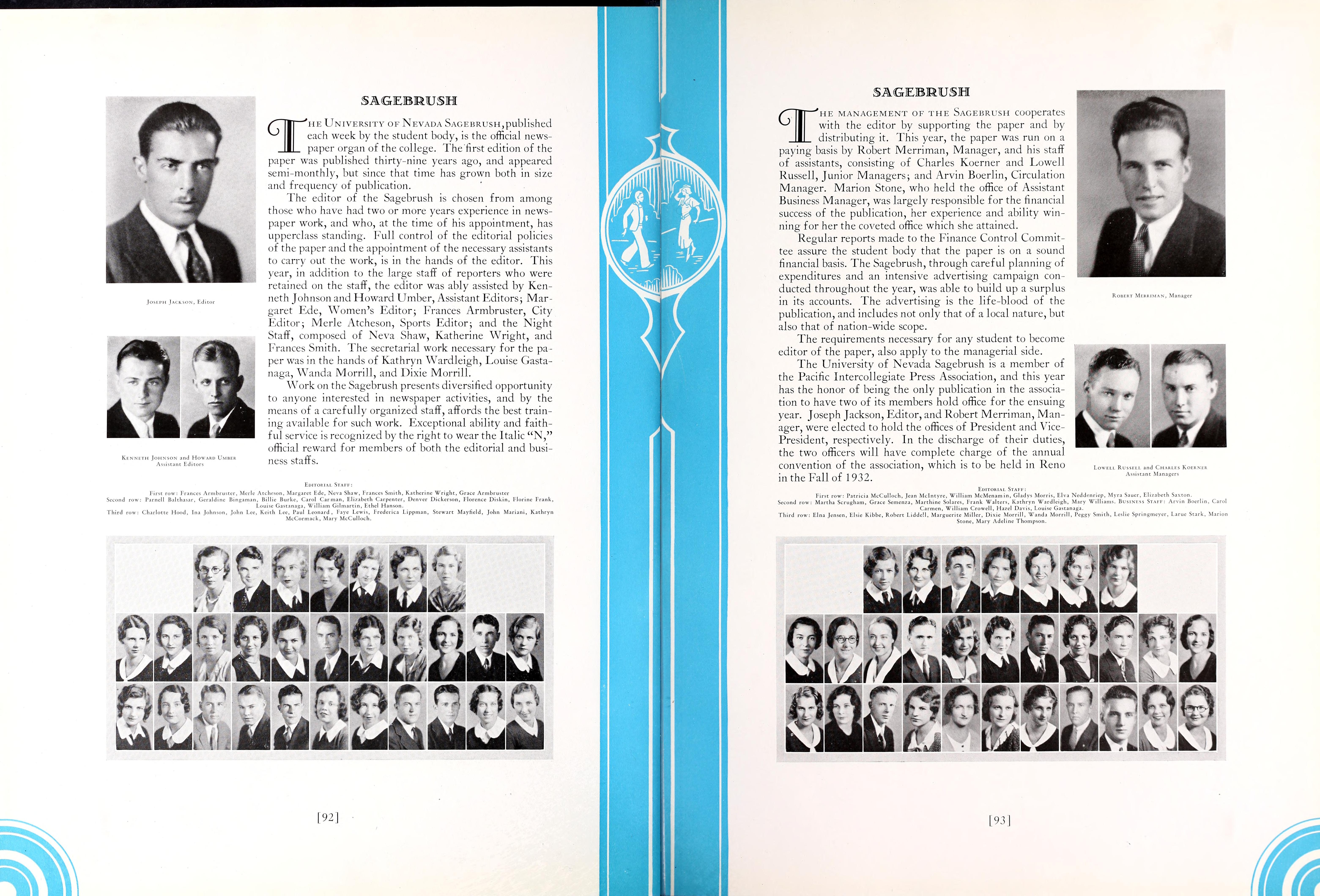
Sagebrush, 1932

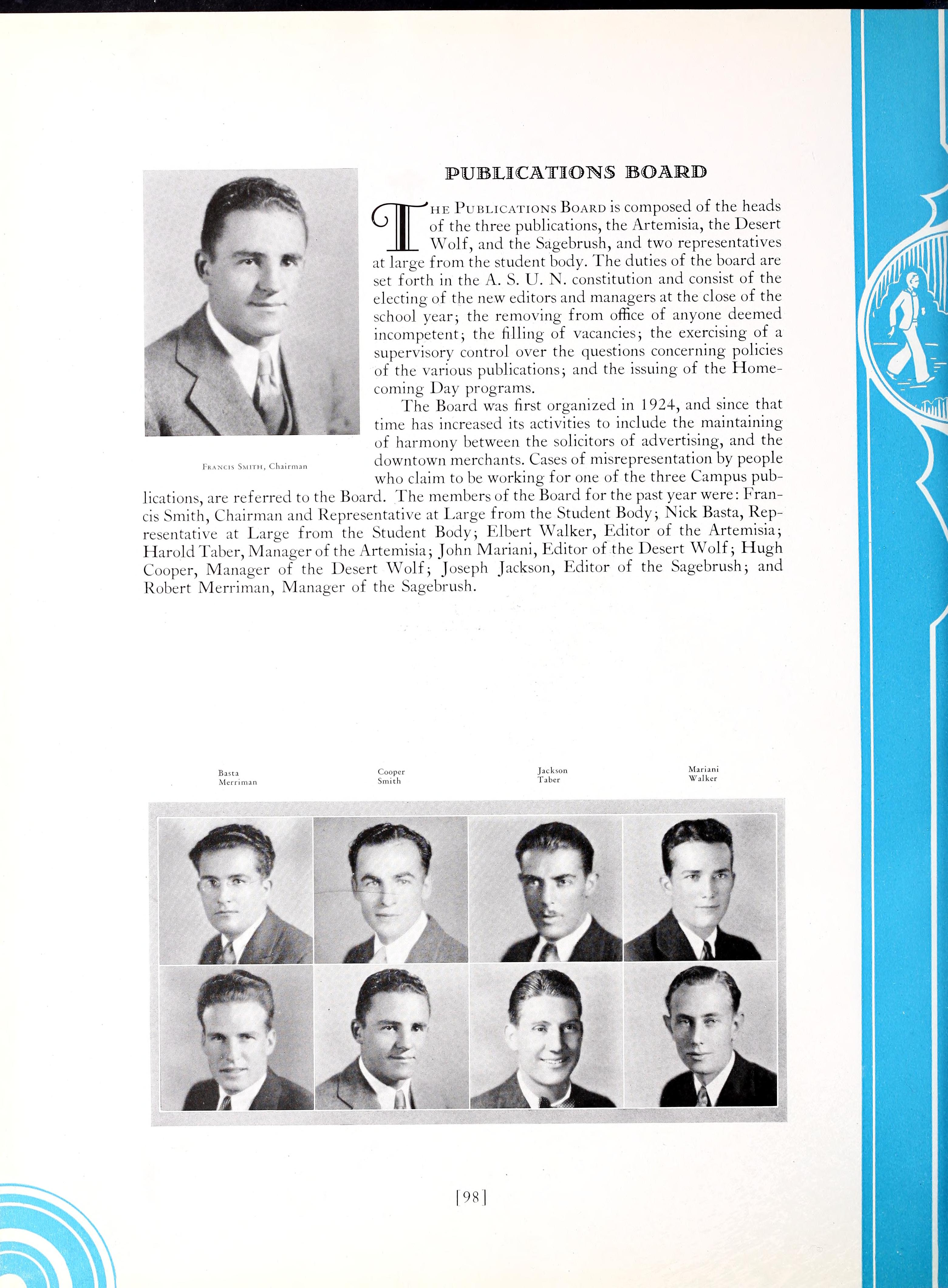
Publications Board, 1932

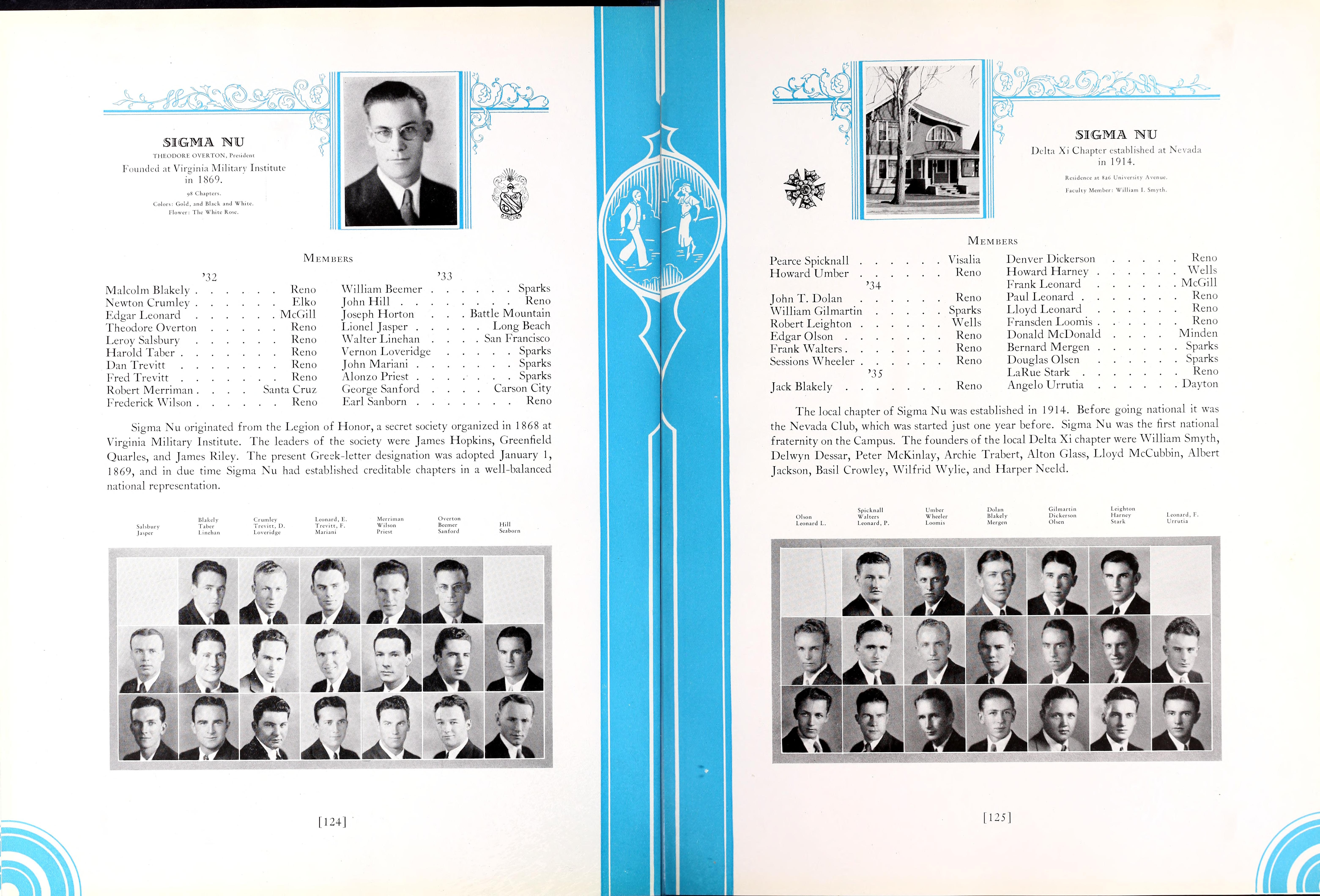
Sigma Nu, 1932

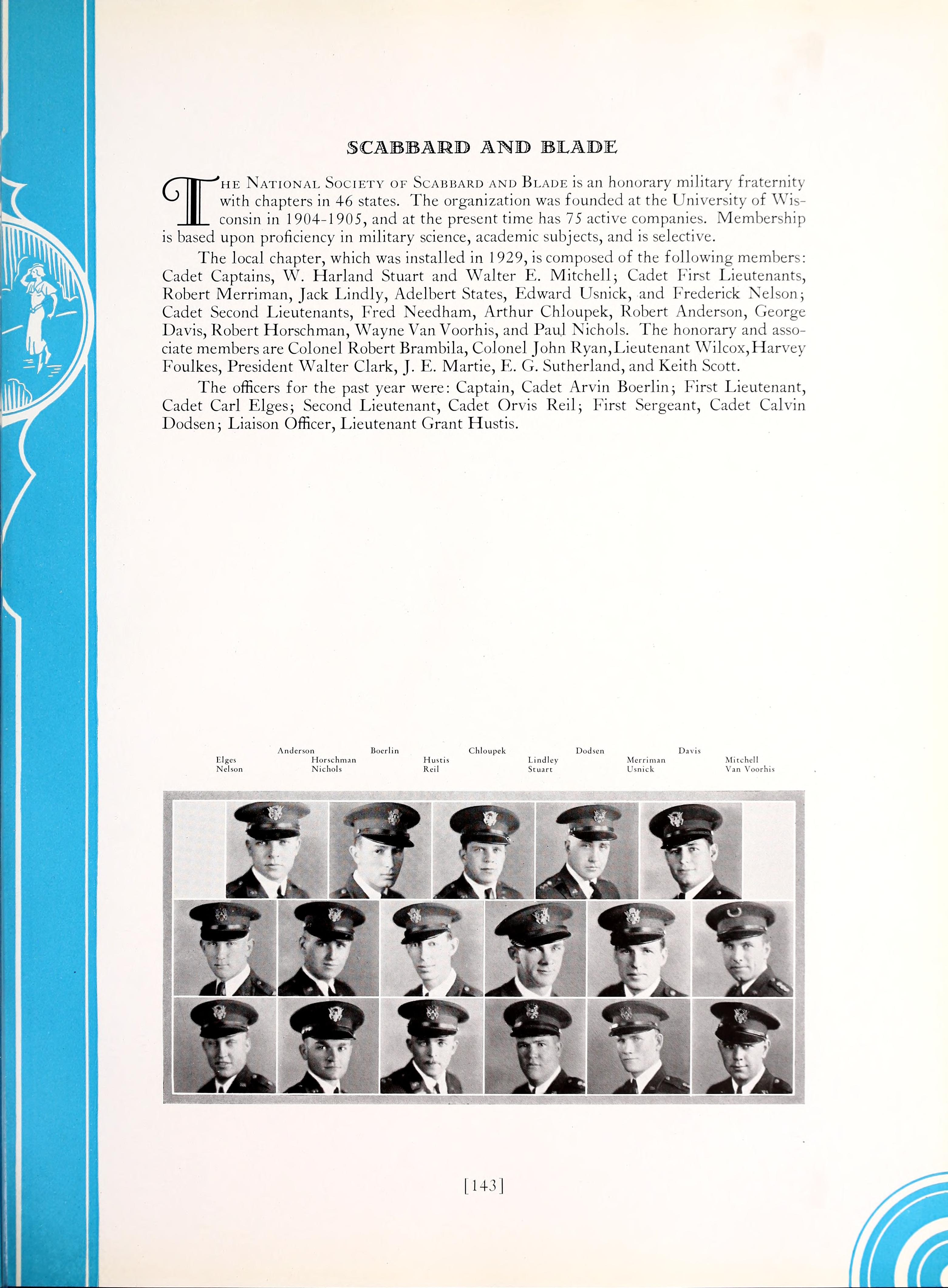
Scabbard and Blade, 1932

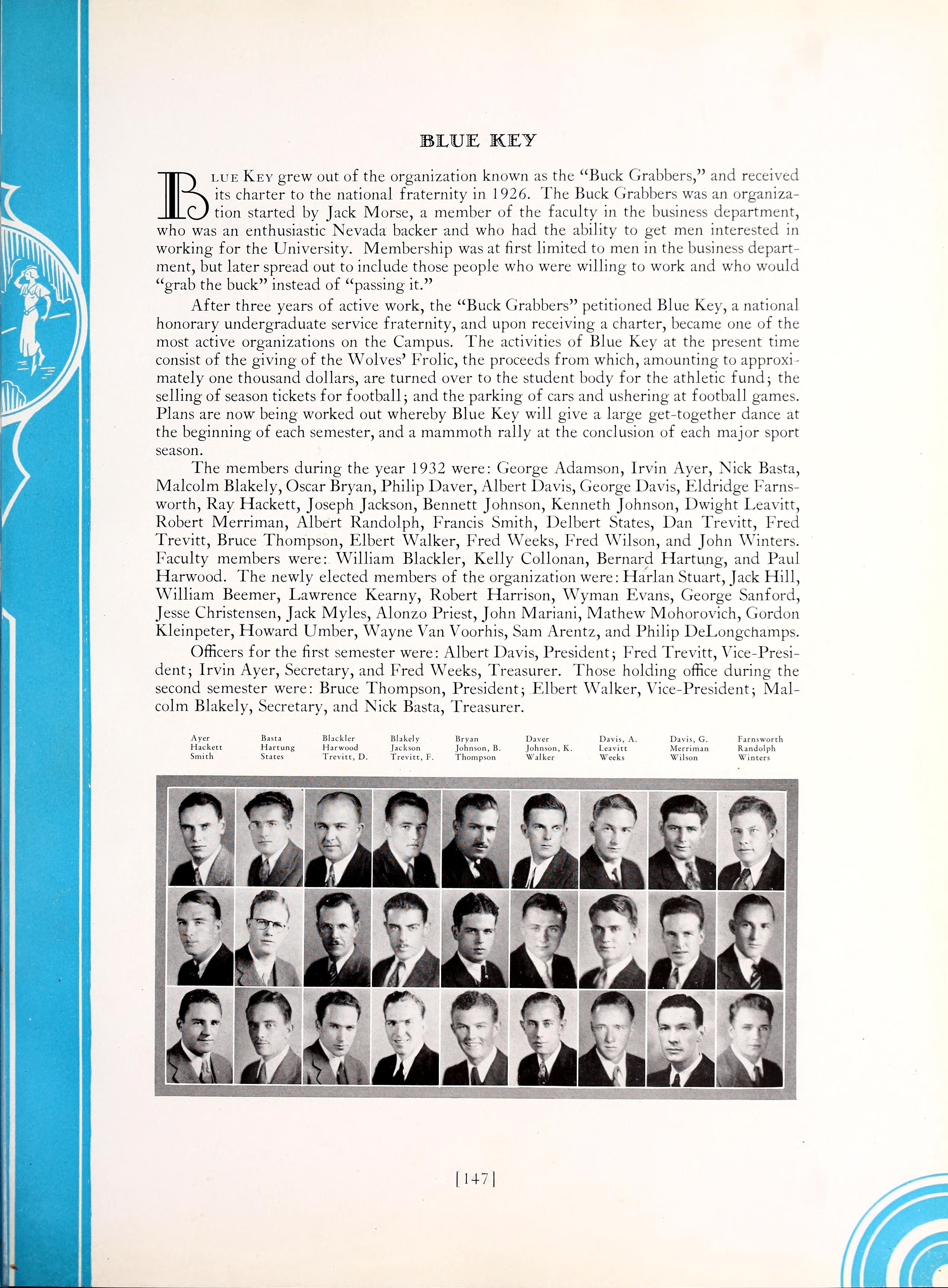
Blue Key, 1932

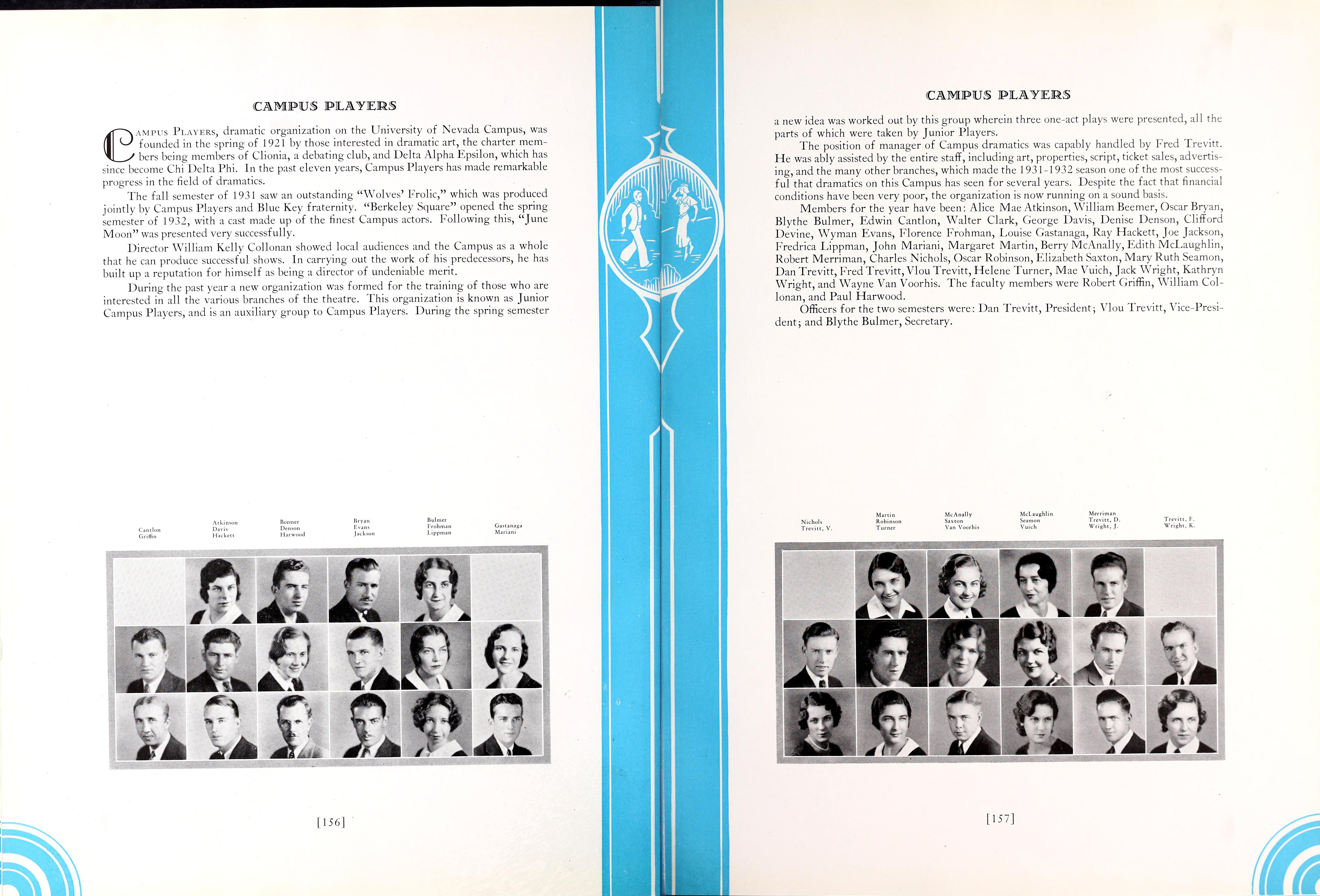
Campus Players, 1932

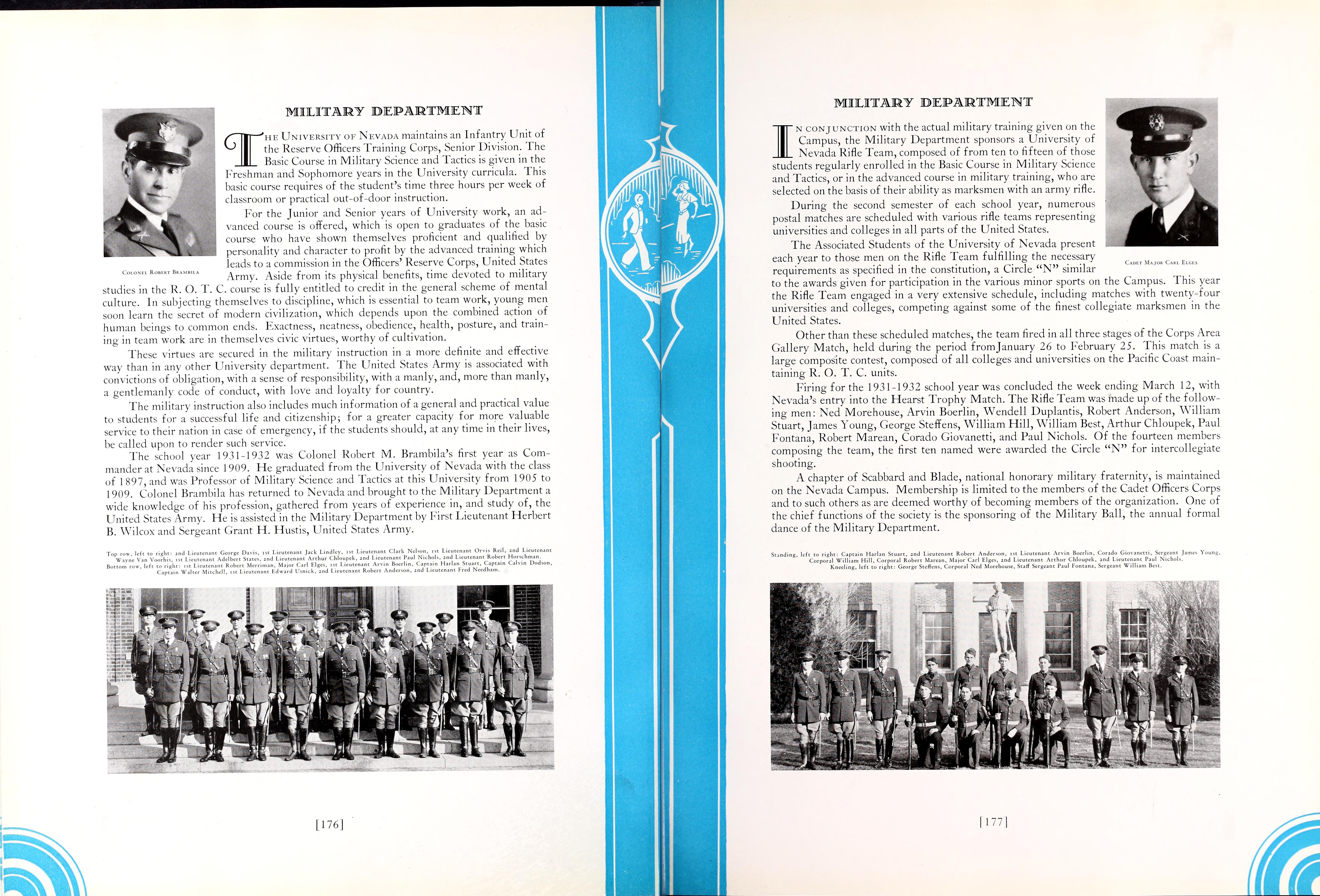
Military Department, 1932

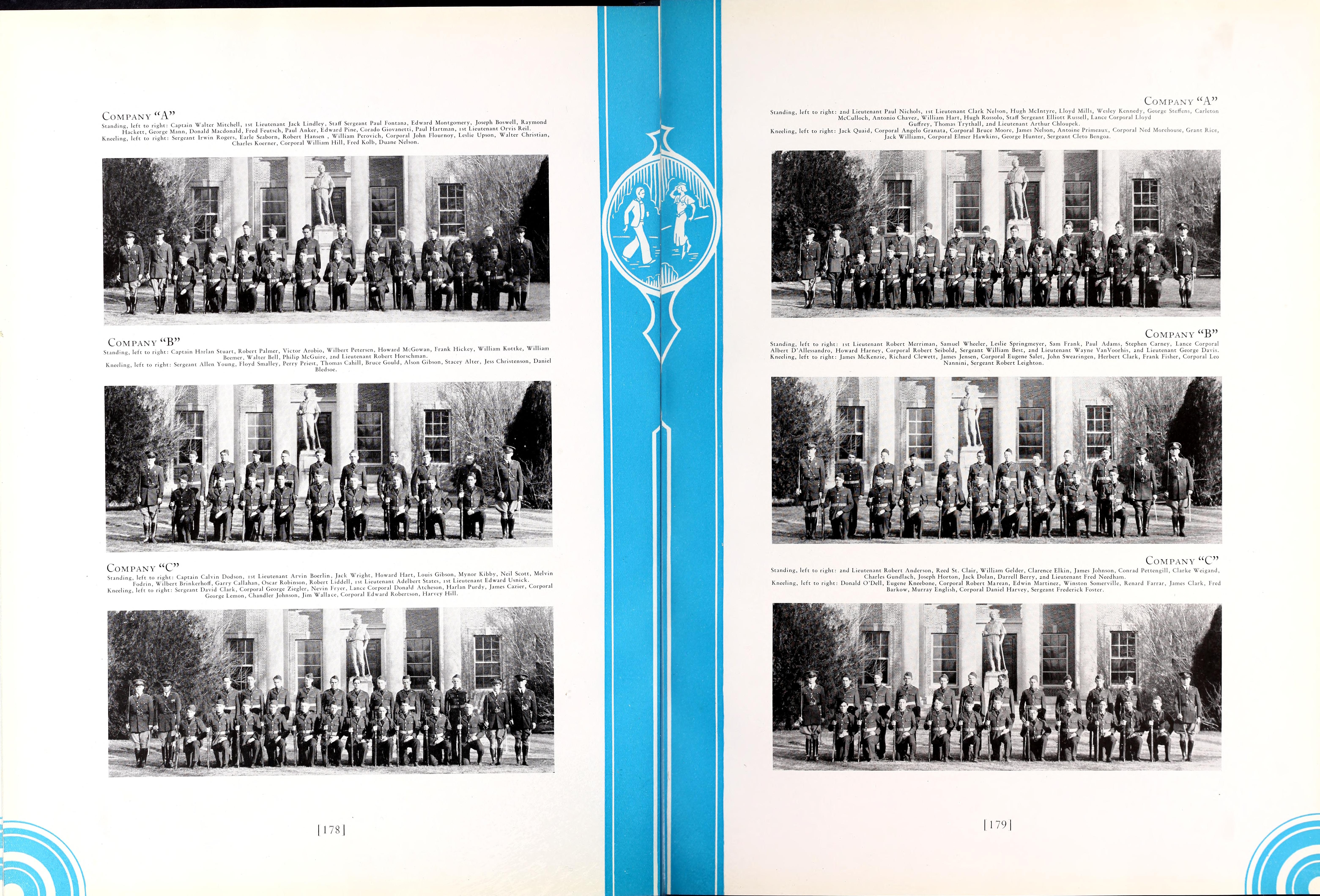
Military Department Companies, 1932

== Sources ==
- Merriman, Marion; Lerude, Warren (1986). American Commander in Spain: Robert Hale Merriman and the Abraham Lincoln Brigade. Nevada: University of Nevada Press. ISBN 0-87417-106-7.
- Eric Blaine Coleman, Some Men Put In Their Lives: Americans in the International Brigades, Spain 1936-1939, (2001)
- Antony Beevor, Battle for Spain: The Spanish Civil War 1936-1939 (2006) ISBN 978-0-297-84832-5
- Hugh Thomas, The Spanish Civil War. (Revised edition 2003) ISBN 978-0-14-101161-5
