= William Herrick (novelist) =

American novelist

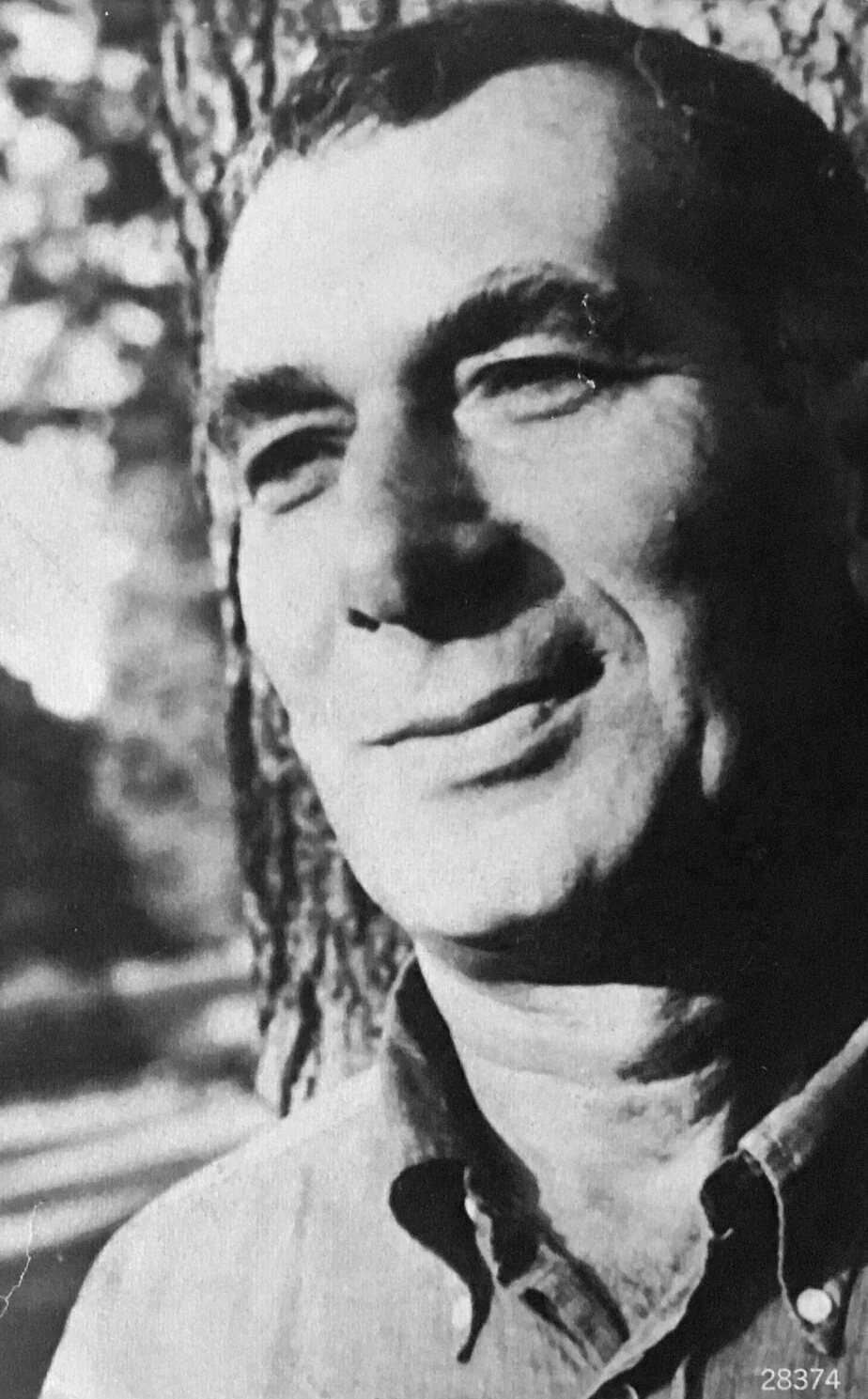
Herrick c. 1967

William Herrick (January 10, 1915 – January 31, 2004) was an American novelist, sometimes referred to as "an American Orwell".

== Biography ==
Herrick was born to Jewish parents who had come to the United States from Belarus and settled in Trenton, New Jersey. Herrick was among the Abraham Lincoln Brigade which fought Franco's forces during the Spanish Civil War.

Drawing on that experience he wrote Hermanos! (1969), a novel about the war itself, and another novel set in Spain, Shadows and Wolves (1980), about the post-Franco period. He left the American Communist Party over the Hitler–Stalin Pact in 1939 and criticised the Brigade as willing accomplices of the Communist secret police, who were killing off anyone who criticized the Party. This is reflected in the plot of "Hermanos!" whose American Communist protagonist comes to Spain in order to fight Fascism, but gets diverted into hunting down members of the dissident radical left POUM - eventually breaking away from the party and rejoining the last desperate fight of the Republic up to the fall of Barcelona.

Two other novels touch on his experience in Spain: Love and Terror (1981) and Kill Memory (1983). His autobiography is entitled Jumping the Line: The Adventures and Misadventures of an American Radical (1998).

Herrick died in Old Chatham, New York on January 31, 2004.

== Personal life ==
Herrick was married to artist Jeanette Herrick. Herrick was friends and had a long correspondence with Thomas Berger.

== Bibliography ==
=== Fiction ===
- The Itinerant (1967)
- Hermanos! (1969)
- The Last to Die (1971)
- Strayhorn (1973)
- Golcz: A Novel (1976)
- Shadows and Wolves (1980)
- Love and Terror (1981)
- Kill Memory (1984)
- That's Life: A Fiction (1985)
- Bradovich (1993)

=== Nonfiction ===
- Jumping the Line: The Adventures and Misadventures of an American Radical (1998) - Autobiography
