= János Gálicz =

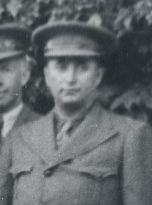
- Born: 1894; Tótkomlós, Austria-Hungary
- Died: 23 September 1939 (aged 44–45); Moscow, Russian SFSR, Soviet Union
- Cause of death: Execution by shooting
- Military career
- Allegiance: Soviet Union; Spanish Republic
- Branch: Red Army; International Brigades
- Rank: Colonel
- Nickname: General Gal
- Commands: Abraham Lincoln Battalion
- Conflicts: World War I: Eastern Front; Russian Civil War; Hungarian Counterrevolution; Spanish Civil War: Siege of Madrid; Battle of Jarama; Battle of Brunete
- Awards: Order of Lenin Order of the Red Banner

János Gálicz (1894 – 23 September 1939), also known by the Russian name Ivan Iosifovich Galits (Russian: Иван Иосифович Галиц) and by the pseudonyms "Dina" and "José Ivanovich Gal", was a Hungarian-Soviet military officer who commanded the XV International Brigade during the Spanish Civil War.

== Biography ==
Gálicz was born in 1894 in Tótkomlós, Békés County in the Kingdom of Hungary, which was then part of the Austro-Hungarian Empire.

As a soldier of the Austro-Hungarian Army, Gálicz participated in the First World War. During his service on the Eastern Front, he fell into Russian captivity. After the October Revolution, he joined the Red Army and took part in the Russian Civil War, joining the Russian Communist Party (Bolsheviks) in 1920; he was also active in Béla Kun's Hungarian Soviet Republic in 1919.

Gálicz graduated from the Frunze Military Academy in Moscow and was promoted to the rank of colonel. In 1936, he was sent to Spain and fought in the International Brigades in the Spanish Civil War under the assumed name of José Ivanovich Gal.

During the February 1937 Battle of Jarama, Gálicz planned and ordered an attack in the hills above the Jarama River which led to what was described by Ernest Hemingway as the decimation of the Twelfth International Brigade.

On 21 June 1937, Gálicz was awarded the Order of Lenin.

In February 1938, after being wounded, Gálicz was relieved of his post as the commander of the XV International Brigade (being replaced by his political commissar Vladimir Ćopić) and elevated to command the 15th Republican Division. At the same time, he was ordered to be arrested on 8 February and dismissed from the Red Army on 13 February. Then on 2 March, he was awarded the Order of the Red Banner. This confusing sequence of events is likely explained by bureaucratic delay, which was commonplace throughout the Soviet Union's history and particularly widespread during the chaos of the Great Purge.

Gálicz eventually returned to the USSR, whereupon he was taken into custody. On 25 June 1939, he was tried by a military tribunal of the NKVD troops and sentenced to death by shooting. The sentence was carried out on 23 September 1939. Gálicz was later rehabilitated on 25 January 1965, shortly after the end of the reign of Nikita Khrushchev.
