= Abraham Osheroff =

American activist, carpenter, lecturer and war veteran (1915 - 2008)

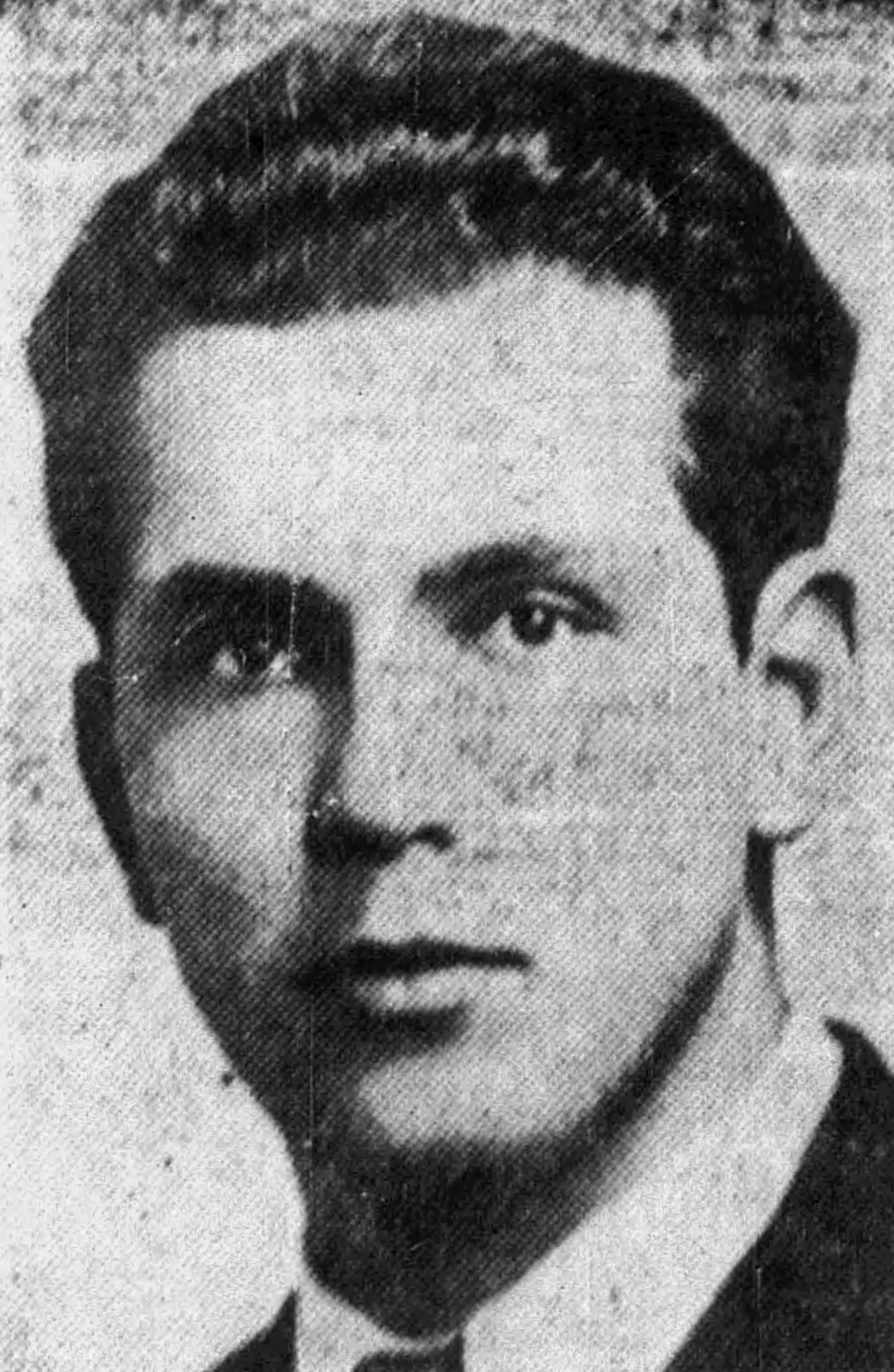
- Osheroff c. 1940
- Born: October 24, 1915; New York City, U.S.
- Died: April 6, 2008 (aged 92); Seattle, Washington, U.S.
- Occupations: Carpenter, documentary filmmaker, lecturer, social activist
- Known for: Abraham Lincoln Brigade
- Political party: Communist (1932–1956)
- Spouses: Sylvia Podolsky (m. 1940, divorced) Claire Rosenbaum (m. 1948; div. 1959) Noel Carrawan (m. 1962; div. 1972) Gunnel Clark (m. 1989)
- Children: Carl; Pete; Jo; Nick; Dov; Sara
- Military career
- Allegiance: Spanish Republic; United States
- Branch: International Brigades; United States Army
- Service years: 1937–1938; 1942–1945
- Rank: Sergeant
- Units: The "Abraham Lincoln" XV International Brigade
- Conflicts: Spanish Civil War; Battle of Fuentes de Ebro (WIA); World War II

Abraham "Abe" Osheroff (October 24, 1915 – April 6, 2008) was an American social activist, carpenter, war veteran, documentary filmmaker, and lecturer.

== Biography ==
=== Early life ===
Osheroff was born on October 24, 1915 into a family of Russian-Jewish immigrants, Sarah and Louis Osheroff, in the Brownsville section of Brooklyn, New York. He spoke Yiddish and "a good smattering of Russian" before English and graduated from the City College of New York.

In the early 1930s, Osheroff began political work. In 1931, during the Great Depression, the police arrested him for moving the furniture of evicted families back into their houses. A policeman, who was a member of the American National Socialist Bund, beat up Osheroff while he was incarcerated and called him a "Goddamn Jew." Around this time, he joined the Communist Party. In 1935, aged 20, he was organizing miners' unions on behalf of the party and raising aid for striking workers.

=== Spanish Civil War ===
When the Spanish Civil War broke out in 1936, Osheroff at first felt no real compulsion to go and fight, but changed his mind after watching footage of the bombing of Guernica by the Luftwaffe. He believed no one should be allowed to inflict such suffering on others and get away with it. He joined the Abraham Lincoln Brigade in April 1937, survived the sinking of the MV Ciudad de Barcelona, and was shot in the knee at the Battle of Fuentes de Ebro. After recovering, he served as an instructor in topography at Tarazona before returning home in July 1938.

=== Later life ===
After returning to the United States, Osheroff ran for a seat in the 23rd Kings County district of the New York State Assembly on the Communist ticket. He polled roughly 3% of the vote. After America entered World War II, he enlisted in the U.S. Army to fight the Third Reich in Europe. The Army did not allow him to go overseas because they were concerned about his political views. Instead, he served as an instructor with the rank of sergeant, based primarily in the South.

At the beginning of World War II, he married his first wife, Sylvia, with whom he had a son named Carl. After the war, he taught at the Jefferson School of Social Science in New York, a Marxist adult school with ties to the Communist Party. After his first wife divorced him, he married Claire Rosenbaum in New York City and they went semi-underground in 1949, moving around the country, working as a carpenter under an assumed name after a tip-off that he was pursued by the FBI. He left in 1951, under persecution from the House Committee on Un-American Activities.

He left the Communist Party in response to the revelation of Stalin's purges, and in 1956, moved to California with his wife and two-year-old son, Pete (b. 1954). He abandoned the family many times in order to pursue more lofty goals of "saving the world" and in 1959, when his daughter, Jo (b. 1958), was only six months old, his wife filed for divorce. In 1962, Osheroff married his third wife Noel Carrawan. They had three children, Nick (b. 1959), Dov (b. 1962), and Sara (b. 1964) and lived in Venice, California until they divorced in 1972. Osheroff was key in the struggle to save the Venice Canals from development and to stop authorities from driving out the poor families, like his, that dominated the area. Osheroff worked as a carpenter and taught his two sons, Nick and Dov, the trade.

After splitting from many of his best friends in the Communist Party, he threw his efforts into the Civil Rights Movement building a community center in 1965, in Holmes County, Mississippi, where he was threatened by the police because he was working with African Americans (the police were allied with Ku Klux Klan elements). Osheroff had initially thought to make a contribution to the civil rights movement in the American South by rebuilding the Highlander Folk School in Tennessee, however, after discussing the matter with Myles Horton, Highlander's founder, a plan was developed to build a community center in Mississippi instead. While building the Mileston Community Center, Osheroff stayed with Hartman Turnbow, a leader of the movement in Holmes County.

In 1974 he completed the documentary Dreams and Nightmares, on the Spanish military bases sold to Francoist Spain by Richard Nixon, which shocked many, as at the time Nixon was still a popular president. Dreams & Nightmares won the top award at a socialist documentary film festival in Leipzig, then in Socialist East Germany. Permission to return to Spain in 1971 in order to create the documentary was obtained because Osheroff, despite his lack of experience, succeeded in duping the authorities of Francoist Spain.

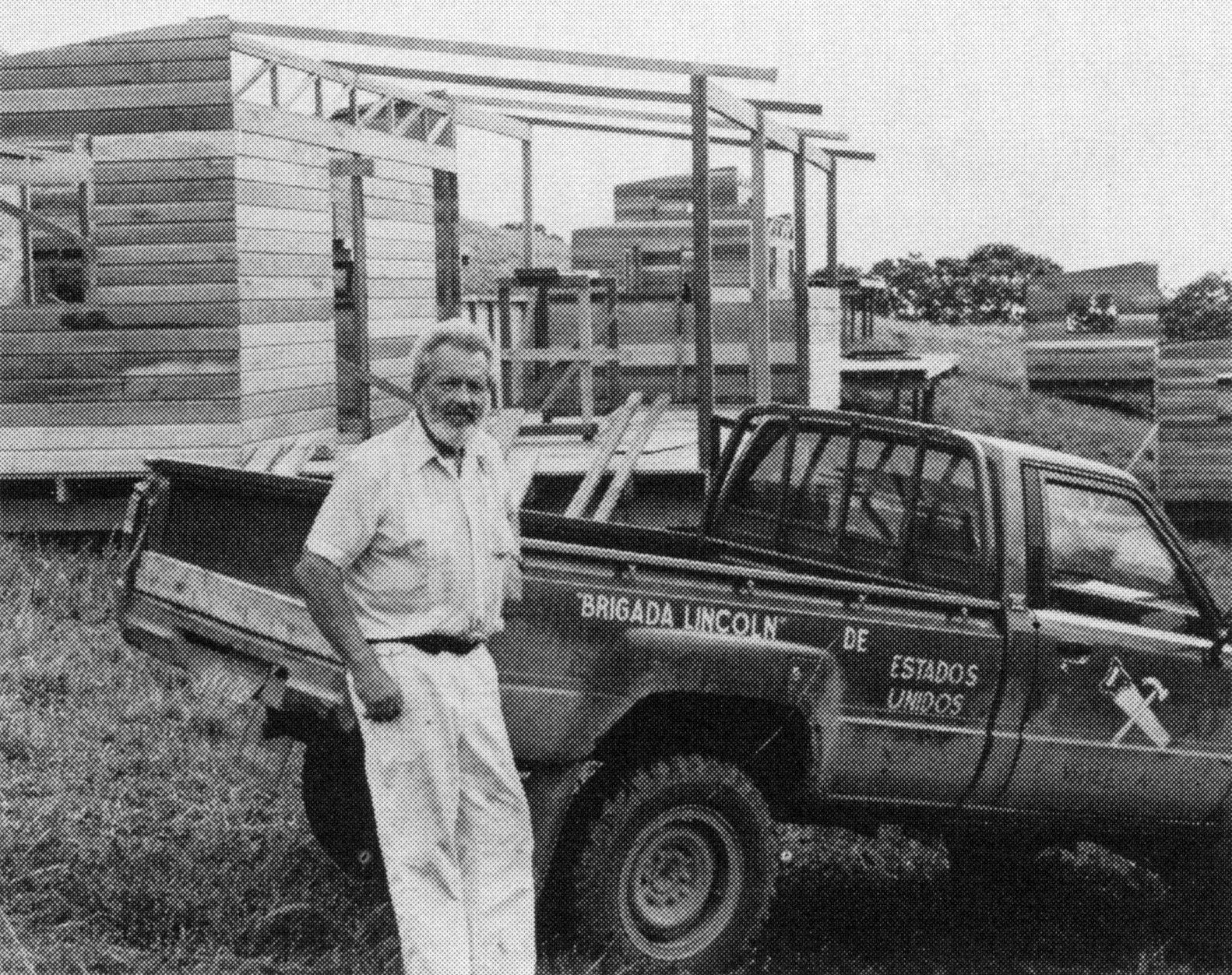
Osheroff in Nicaragua, 1985

In 1985, he organized a village building brigade in America to travel to Nicaragua to aid the Sandinistas. Later, he was highly active in movements opposing the Gulf War and Iraq War, and he drove the Peace Mobile.

In March 2008, Osheroff traveled with his wife, Gunnel Clark, and friends from his Seattle home to San Francisco for the unveiling of the United States's first monument to the Abraham Lincoln Brigade. He was determined to go, and it took great effort to get him there. But Osheroff was the guest of honor, one of the 20 or so last survivors of the Brigade. Osheroff used to say, "I have one foot in the grave but the other keeps dancing."

=== Death ===
After more than seven decades of deep involvement with what he called "radical humanism," Osheroff died on April 6, 2008, a few days after returning to Seattle.
