= Alfred Chakin =

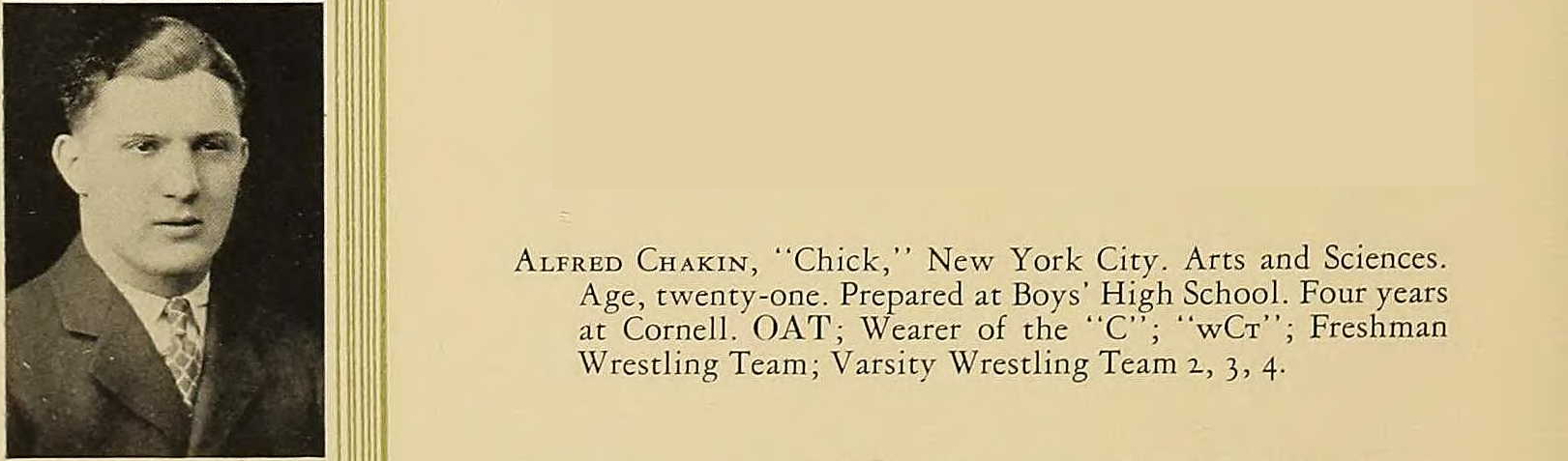
Chakin in the Cornell University yearbook, 1926

Abraham Alfred "Chick" Chakin (December 25, 1904 – March 1938) was an American volunteer in the International Brigades during the Spanish Civil War, an athlete and educator.

== Biography ==
Born in Brooklyn, Chakin studied education at Cornell University, graduating in 1926. A fine athlete, he was the star of Cornell's wrestling team and just missed being named to the 1924 US Olympic wrestling team. During the 1930s, he worked as a physical education instructor at City College of New York and coach of the college's wrestling team. He was an active participant in the College Teachers Union and Anti-Fascist Association.

In July, 1936, Chakin went to Barcelona as coach of the American team at the People's Olympiad, an international athletic meet organized to protest the official Olympics held that summer in Berlin, the capital of Nazi Germany. On July 19, two days before the games were scheduled to begin, as Chakin and the rest of the team were preparing to leave for the stadium to train, rebel troops tried to take control of Barcelona in a military coup. The Spanish Civil War had begun. The games were cancelled, and Chakin returned to the United States with the rest of the team.

In 1937, Chakin left his position at City College to join the International Brigades fighting on the side of the Spanish Republic. He served as armorer with the mostly-Canadian Mackenzie-Papineau Battalion. He was captured by Fascist forces on March 17, 1938, near Caspe as the XV International Brigade retreated from Teruel, and was executed a few days later.

Chakin was married to Jennie Berman, a New York social worker who headed the Child Care Commission of the Social Workers Committee to Aid Spanish Democracy, which visited Spain to assess the humanitarian situation and resettle children displaced by the war.

== Sources ==
- "Nine Athletes Selected," The New York Times, 2 July 1936, 18.
- Bernard N. Danchik Collection, Abraham Lincoln Brigade Archives, New York University, New York.
- Carroll, Peter N. The Odyssey of the Abraham Lincoln Brigade: Americans in the Spanish Civil War. Stanford: Stanford University Press, 1994.
- Howard, Victor. The Mackenzie-Papineau Battalion: The Canadian Contingent in the Spanish Civil War. Toronto: Copp Clark, 1969.
- O'Hare, Mark. "The Fascists Shot at Us." The Daily Worker, 16 August 1936, 6.

=== Bibliography ===
- For an account of the British team's experience during the abortive People's Olympiad, see Chapter Six of Berlin Games – How Hitler Stole the Olympic Dream, by Guy Walters ISBN 0-7195-6783-1 (UK) 0060874120 (US)
