= Sixth of February Battalion =

- Bataillon Six-Février
- Active: 20 December 1936 – 22 April 1938
- Country: French and Belgian
- Allegiance: Republican Spain
- Branch: International Brigades
- Type: Infantry battalion
- Part of: XV International Brigade; XIV International Brigade
- Patron: Sixth of February
- Engagements: Spanish Civil War: Battle of Jarama

Commanders
- Notable commanders: Gabriel Fort

The "Sixth of February" Battalion (French: Bataillon Six-Février, Spanish: Batallón Seis de Febrero) was a Franco-Belgian International Brigade battalion during the Spanish Civil War. The Battalion served in the XV and XIV International Brigades. It took its name from the date of 1934 anticipated right-wing putsch against the Popular Front in France which was purportedly defeated by various left-wing groups.

== History ==
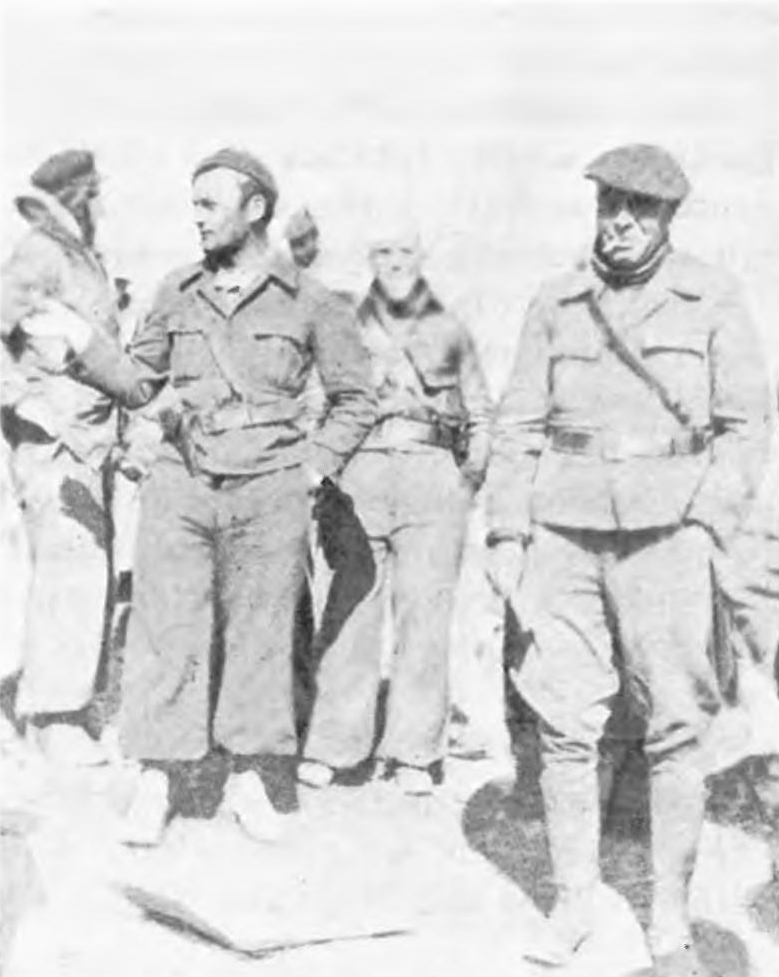
Commander Gabriel Fort with the battalion, February 1937

The "Sixth of February" Battalion was founded on 20 December 1936 but did not become active until 31 January 1937. It was formed mainly by French and Belgian volunteers, although it also included Algerian, Moroccan, Tangerine, Greek, Syrian, American, Chinese, Zionist Jewish and Hungarian personnel. The name of the unit was in reference to the violent demonstration of 6 February 1934 in Paris, which was led by far-right leagues against the left-wing French parliament.

Until mid-1937, it was part of the XV International Brigade. The Frenchman Gabriel Fort was its commander until 12 February 1937, when he was severely wounded during the Battle of Jarama, where the unit fought between 11 and 27 February. Then, the Romanian Émile Schneiberg took command until his death two days later in the same battle. On 4 August 1937 it was moved to the XIV International Brigade, and comprised three companies of riflemen. The 1st Company had a machine-gun section. Gabriel Fort was designated commander again on 7 August, but lost his vision in Villanueva de la Cañada during the following fights. It was part of the XIV International Brigade Bis between 27 September 1937 and 23 February 1938, but it belonged again to the XIV until its dissolution on 22 April 1938.
