= Delmer Berg =

American veteran of Spanish Civil War (1915–2016)

Einsley Delmer Berg
- Born: December 20, 1915; Anaheim, California, U.S.
- Died: February 29, 2016 (aged 100); Columbia, California, U.S.
- Military career
- Allegiance: Spanish Republic; United States of America
- Branch: Oregon National Guard; International Brigades; United States Army
- Service years: 1937–1939; 1942–1945
- Unit: 76th Field Artillery Regiment
- Conflicts: Spanish Civil War; Battle of the Ebro; Battle of Teruel; World War II; Battle of Morotai
- Other work: Farmer; union organizer; cement finisher; landscape gardener; activist

Einsley Delmer "Del" Berg (December 20, 1915 – February 28, 2016) was an American soldier and union organizer who volunteered to serve with the XV International Brigade (nicknamed the Abraham Lincoln Brigade) during the Spanish Civil War. He was the last known surviving veteran of the Lincoln Brigade.

== Early years ==
Born in Anaheim, California, Berg was raised on a farm near Manteca, and then worked as a teenager on a farm in Oregon. He later said his family's poverty helped radicalize him. At 21, he joined the Young Communist League, which was one of the organizations recruiting volunteers for the Spanish Civil War. He briefly trained with the Oregon National Guard before going to Spain in 1937. In August 1938, after eight months of combat, he was wounded in Valencia when fascist planes bombed a monastery he was staying at. Shrapnel from the explosions penetrated his liver. While convalescing at a Valencia hospital, Berg met a group of Americans who led him to join a newly formed branch of the Communist Party USA. He remained an interested and active Party member up until his last interview in 2014. He served in the U.S. Army during World War II and was stationed in New Guinea and on Morotai Island.

== Career ==
Following his demobilization, Berg returned to Modesto, California and found work where he could. He was a farm laborer for 20 years. He fathered two sons from two different marriages. He began serving as a union organizer in the 1950s, working with the United Farm Workers. He represented the Agricultural Workers Organizing Committee in Washington, D.C. hearings on farm conditions. He became an official of the National Association for the Advancement of Colored People (NAACP) when he was elected vice president of the Stanislaus County branch. He once delivered a petition to the county's racist sheriff, demanding his resignation. During the Second Red Scare, Berg was often harassed for his political activism. In a 2007 profile in the Union Democrat, he recalled the steps he took to evade and discourage the attention of FBI agents.

As the last survivor of the Abraham Lincoln Brigade, Berg was sought out frequently for interviews. His decision to volunteer to fight fascism in a foreign country was characterized as inspirational. In an episode of the PBS show History Detectives focused on an artifact from the Spanish Civil War, he provided background about the experience of American volunteers.

In his final decade, Berg lived in Columbia, California. He became a centenarian in December 2015. He died two months later on February 28, 2016.

On March 25, 2016, approximately a month after Berg's death, U.S. Senator John McCain published an op-ed in The New York Times saluting Berg and his comrades who had fought for the values they believed in, both in Spain and in the U.S. when they returned home.

== See also ==
- Lincoln Battalion
- XV International Brigade
