= Ralph Bates (writer) =

English novelist, writer, journalist and political activist

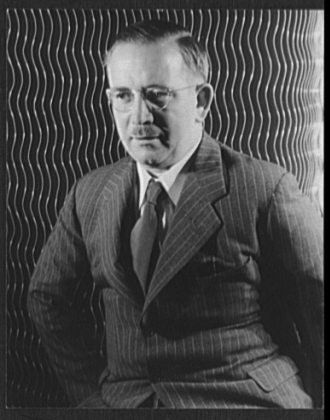
Ralph Bates in 1938. Photo by Carl Van Vechten.

Ralph Bates (3 November 1899 – 26 November 2000) was an English novelist, writer, journalist and political activist. He is best known for his writings on pre–Civil War Spain.

== Life ==
Bates was born in Swindon, England in 1899 and as a teenager worked at the Great Western Railway factory. In 1917, he enlisted in the British Army and served in World War I, training soldiers to prepare for poison gas attacks.

After returning from the war, he began to travel, to France and then, in 1923, to Spain, where he had wanted to visit since boyhood (his great-grandfather, a steamer captain, was buried in Cádiz). He stayed in the country permanently from then on, travelling and doing odd jobs. He published his first work, Sierra, a collection of short stories, in 1933; in 1934, a novel, Lean Men. 1936 saw the publication of Bates's best-known work, The Olive Field, about olive workers in southern Spain. The book received good critical notices in the United States. For such writing, Bates has been hailed as a master of the "proletarian novel", alongside Tressell, MacGill and Grassic Gibbon, a genre offering "a new set of narrative concerns and characters".

=== Spanish Civil War ===
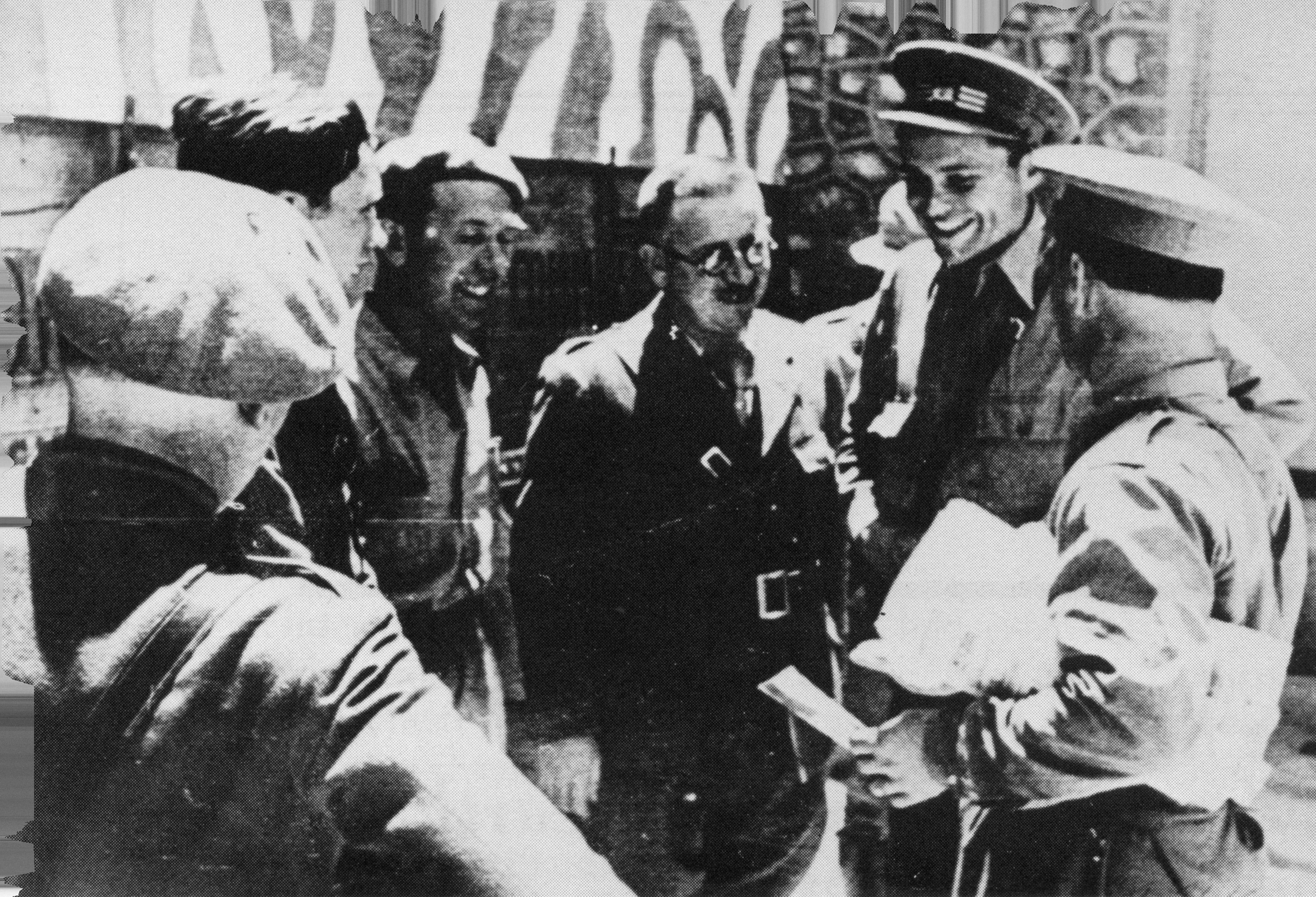
Bates (third from right, with glasses) converses with Steve Nelson (third from left), Martin Hourihan (second from right), and Mirko Markovics (far right) at Brunete, 1937

When the Spanish Civil War began in 1936, Bates was walking in the Pyrenees with his wife Winifred. Bates immediately enlisted with the government forces, initially working in propaganda and information services, and made rank of political commissar. His wife worked with him as a journalist and broadcaster in the Ministry of Information, then joined the British Medical Unit in June 1937. In October 1936 he visited the British Tom Mann Centuria, arranging replacement of their commander and convincing them to join other English-speaking volunteers in the Thälmann Battalion of the XII International Brigade, training in Albacete. Later that year he travelled to the United States to raise awareness of the plight of the Spanish Republic. Bates was briefly arrested for arms smuggling when traveling through France back to Spain in February 1937. In May 1937 he addressed the British Battalion at Jarama about the May 'Disorders in Catalonia' following the Party line that it was all the fault of the POUM, Trotskyists and spies. He moved to Madrid and founded the XV International Brigade's newspaper, The Volunteer for Liberty. In June 1937 he escorted Harry Pollitt, British Communist leader, who was visiting Madrid. He frequently travelled to the United States and Mexico in 1937 and 1938, meeting his future wife, Eve Salzman on one trip.

=== Post-war ===
He joined the British Communist Party in 1923. After the Soviet invasion of Finland in November, 1939, he publicly condemned the Communists in an article for The New Republic. During the investigations of suspected Communists in the 1950s, he refused to testify before the House Committee on Un-American Activities.

After the end of the Spanish Civil War, Bates moved to Mexico, where he lived for a number of years, publishing The Fields of Paradise in 1940. In 1947, he became a professor of creative writing and English literature at New York University, a post he would hold until his retirement in 1966. He published his last book, The Dolphin in the Wood, in 1950, although he would continue to work on several unfinished writings up to his death 50 years later.

After his retirement, he moved with his wife to the Greek island of Naxos, where he pursued his lifelong hobby of mountain-climbing well into his 80s. He died in Manhattan in 2000, aged 101, and his cremated remains were scattered in Naxos.

== Bibliography ==
=== Novels ===
- The Lean Men (Peter Davies, 1934; Macmillan, 1935; Penguin [two volumes], 1938)
- The Olive Field (Jonathan Cape, E. P. Dutton, 1936; Hogarth Press, 1986)
- Rainbow Fish (Jonathan Cape, E. P. Dutton, 1937)
  - (includes four short novels: 'Rainbow Fish', 'Death of a Virgin', 'The Other Land' and 'Dead End of the Sky')
- The Fields of Paradise (E. P. Dutton, 1940)
- The Undiscoverables (Random House, 1942)
- The Dolphin in the Wood (Random House, 1950)

=== Short stories ===
- Sierra (Peter Davies, 1933)
- The Miraculous Horde and Other Stories (Jonathan Cape, 1939; expanded Random House edition as Sirocco and Other Stories, 1939)

=== Biography ===
- Franz Schubert (Peter Davies, 1934)
