= 24th Battalion (International Brigade) =

24 Battalion
- Active: 14 March 1937–1938
- Country: Cuba
- Allegiance: Spanish Republic
- Branch: International Brigades
- Type: Battalion – Infantry
- Role: Home Defence
- Part of: XV International Brigade
- Engagements: Spanish Civil War

The 24 Battalion was a unit of the International Brigades made up of Cuban volunteers during the Spanish Civil War. The Battalion served in the XV International Brigade and was later moved to a Spanish unit.

== History ==
It was founded on 14 March 1937 and was formed mainly by Cuban volunteers. On 10 November 1937 it was moved to one of the Spanish mixed brigades.
