= XV International Brigade =

Republican brigade in the Spanish Civil War

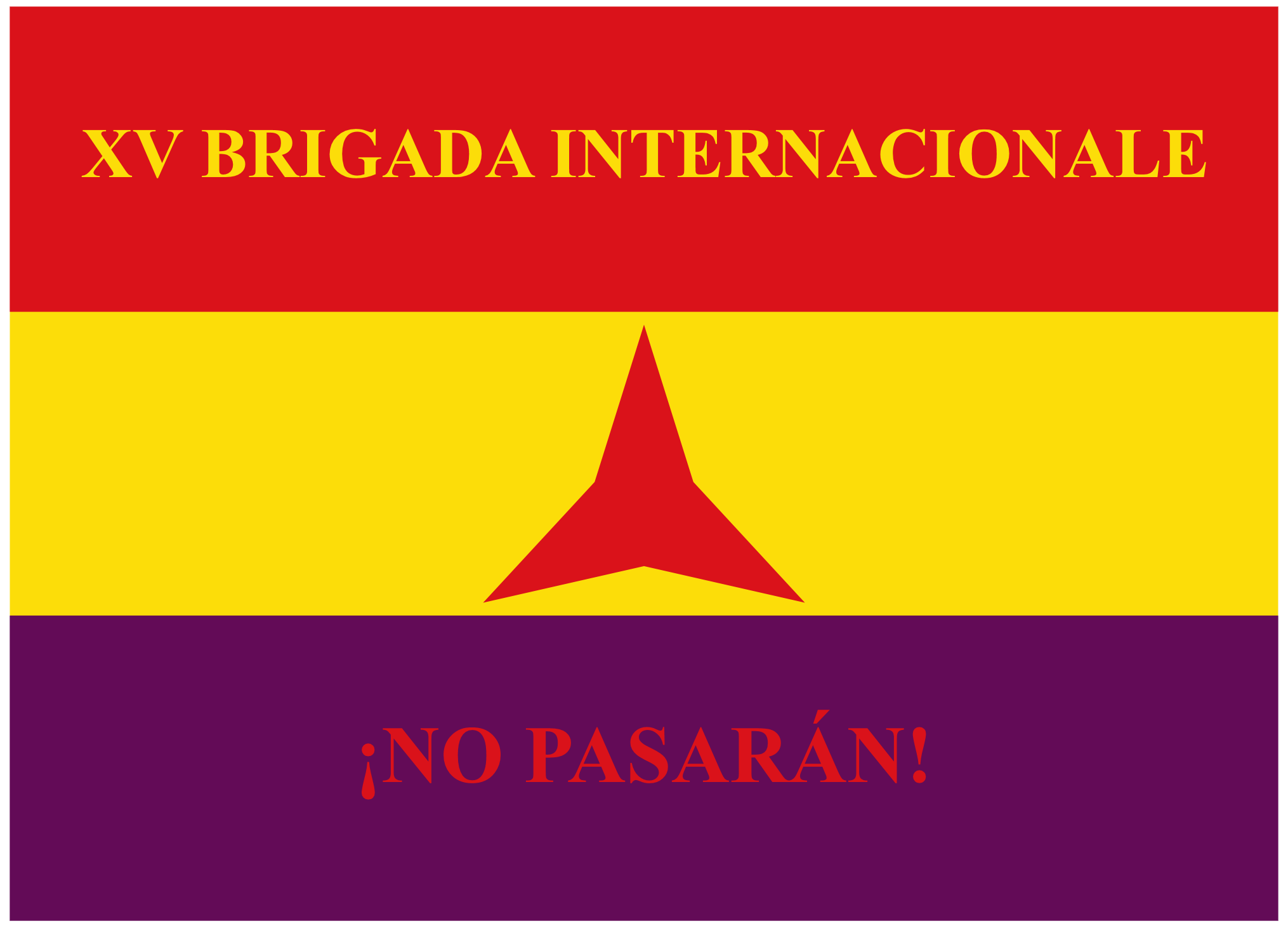
- Flag of the XV International Brigade
- Active: January 1937 – 9 February 1939
- Country: United States, United Kingdom, Canada, Ireland, Bulgaria, Greece, Yugoslavia, France, Belgium, and Cuba
- Allegiance: Spanish Republic
- Branch: International Brigades
- Type: Mixed Brigade – Infantry
- Role: Home Defence
- Size: Four battalions: the 16th, 17th, 18th and 19th (January 1937)
- Part of: 35th Division (1937–1939)
- Garrison/HQ: Albacete, Barcelona
- Nickname: Brigada Abraham Lincoln (American)
- Motto: "No pasarán!"
- March: Jarama Valley and Viva la XV Brigada
- Engagements: Spanish Civil War: Battle of Jarama; Battle of Brunete; Battle of Belchite; Battle of Teruel; Aragon Withdrawal; Battle of Gandesa; Battle of the Ebro; Catalonia Offensive

Commanders
- Notable commanders: Janos Galicz; Vladimir Ćopić; Robert Hale Merriman; Milton Wolff; Bill Alexander; Tom Wintringham; Malcolm Dunbar; Veli Dedi

The XV International Brigade, also known as the Abraham Lincoln Brigade, was one of the International Brigades formed to fight for the Spanish Republic during the Spanish Civil War.

== History ==
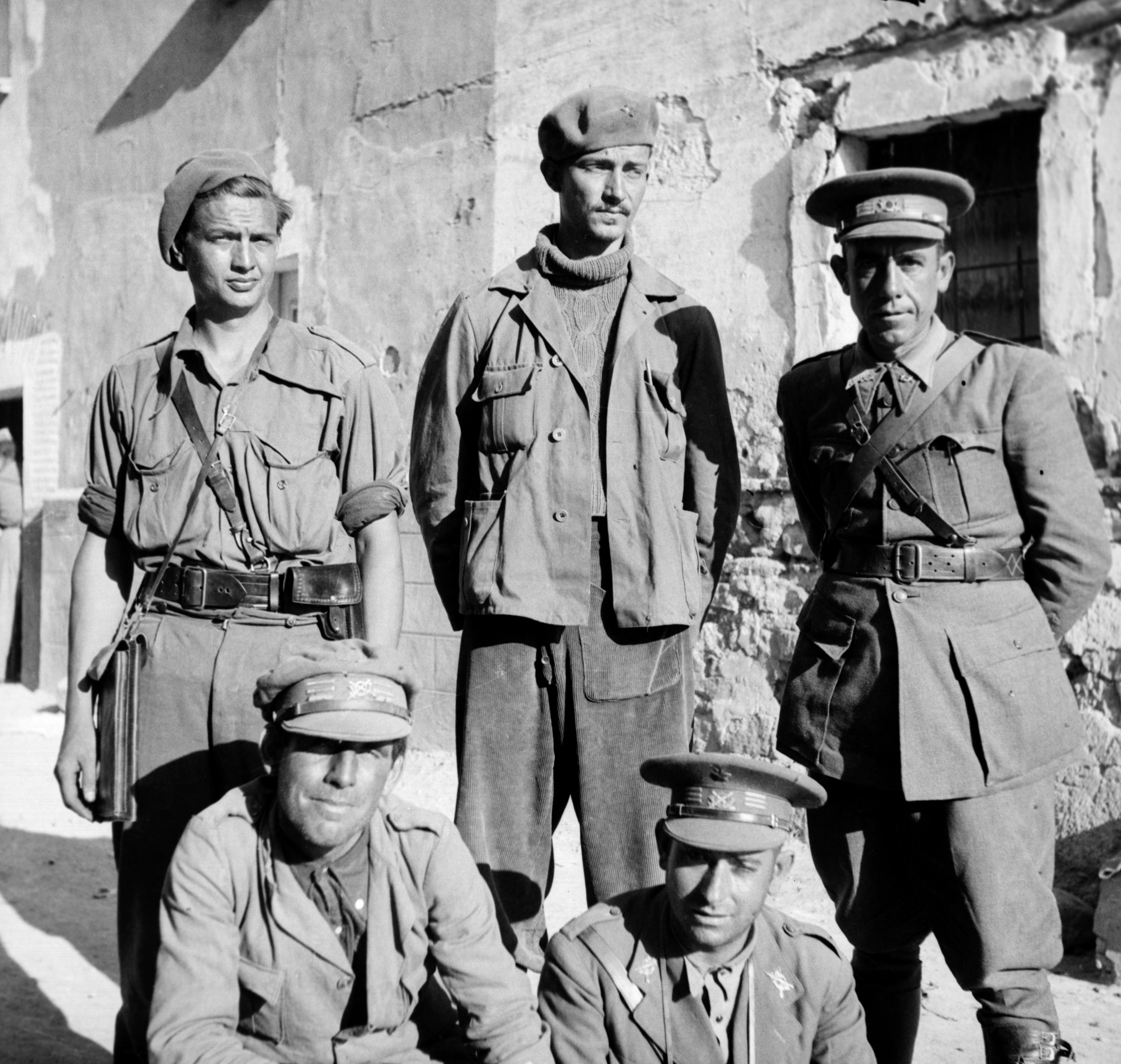
XV International Brigade Commanders, October 1937. Standing (L-R): Robert G. Thompson (Mackenzie–Papineau), Philip Detro (Lincoln-Washington), Garcia (24th). Seated: Paddy O'Daire (Irish), Aguila (24th).

The XVth Brigade mustered at Albacete in January 1937. It consisted of English-speaking volunteers – arranged into four battalions: the mostly British Saklatvala Battalion, the mostly North American Lincoln Battalion, the Balkan Dimitrov Battalion and the Franco-Belgian Sixth February Battalion. The brigade fought at Jarama, Brunete, Boadilla, Belchite, Fuentes de Ebro, Teruel and the Ebro River.

The brigade's first combat, at the Battle of Jarama in February 1937, resulted in heavy casualties. The British lost 225 men out of 600, the Lincolns 120 out of 500. After the battle, the brigade was seriously undermanned.

At the end of March, a Spanish battalion, Voluntario 24 (the 24th Volunteers), joined the brigade. Over the next few months, under the close supervision of Janos Galicz, the XVth was re-organized into two regiments of about 1,200 men. Galicz appointed "the gallant major", George Nathan, as brigade Chief of Staff.

The first regiment, commanded by Jock Cunningham, with Harry Haywood as political commissar, was English-speaking and comprised the depleted British and Lincolns, as well as the recently formed but under-strength second battalion of American volunteers, known as the George Washington Battalion. The second regiment was commanded by Major "Chapaiev" (Mihaly Szalvay) and consisted of the Dimitrov Battalion, the Sixth February Battalion, and the Voluntario 24 Battalion.

This was the composition of the XVth Brigade in July 1937 for the Battle of Brunete. As with the Battle of Jarama, the brigade suffered severe casualties; the brigade strength was reduced from six to four battalions. In particular, the two American battalions were so depleted that they merged to form the Lincoln-Washington Battalion. (This name did not last: it was renamed the Lincoln Battalion in October 1937.) The Sixth February Battalion, which also suffered massive casualties, was transferred after Brunete. After Belchite, the nominally Canadian Mackenzie-Papineau Battalion joined the brigade, while the Dimitrov Battalion departed.

The XVth International Brigade included African Americans in fully integrated units, unlike what was allowed in the U.S. Army in the 1930s. The brigade also included volunteers from Canada and Latin America, some of whom felt slighted and mistreated by the Americans, and left the XVth to join other units such as El Campesino's First Mobile Shock Brigade.

During the autumn of 1937, the units of the International Brigade were consolidated into the Spanish Popular Army and the Battalions were re-numbered. The British Bn became the 57th, the Lincoln-Washington the 58th, the Spanish (formerly known as the 24th), became the 59th and the Mackenzie-Papineau the 60th. The battalion line-up remained stable through the withdrawal of the Internationals during the Ebro Campaign.

Flag of the 17th battalion of the brigade. It was also known as the 1st American Battalion; the 2nd American Battalion was the Washington Battalion.

Music was an important means of lifting spirits within the International Brigades. The XVth Brigade's songs were "Jarama Valley" and "Viva la Quince Brigada". After an invitation from J. B. S. Haldane, American singer and activist Paul Robeson traveled to Spain in 1938 to bolster the Republican cause. He visited the Benicàssim hospital and sang to the wounded soldiers. He also visited the battlefront and provided a morale boost at a time when Republican victory seemed increasingly unlikely.

During the Catalonia Offensive, the Brigade was unable to offer a firm resistance against the Nationalist advance and withdrew to the France–Spain border where it was disbanded on 9 February 1939.

On 13 March 2015, Dan Kaufman interviewed Delmer Berg, who at 99 years old was believed to be the last known survivor of the Abraham Lincoln Brigade. Berg died the following year on 28 February.

== Overview of battalions ==
Date joined	Number	Battalion Name	Composition	Date left	Comments
31 Jan 1937	16th/57th	Saklatvala Battalion	British, Irish, Dominion	23 Sep 1938	Demobilized
31 Jan 1937	17th/58th	Lincoln Battalion	American, Canadian, Irish, British	23 Sep 1938	Demobilized
31 Jan 1937	18th	Dimitrov Battalion	Bulgarian, Greek and Yugoslav	20 Sep 1937	Moved to 45th Div. Reserve
31 Jan 1937	19th	Sixth February Battalion	French and Belgian	4 Aug 1937	Moved to 14th Brigade
14 Mar 1937	24th/59th	Voluntario 24 Battalion	Cuban	10 Nov 1937	Moved to a Spanish Mixed brigade
29 Jun 1937	60th	Mackenzie-Papineau Battalion	American and Canadian	23 Sep 1938	Demobilized
4 Jul 1937	20th	Washington Battalion	American	14 Jul 1937	Merged with Lincoln Battalion

- Sub-battalion units attached to the Brigade
  - Brigade Anti-Tank Company
  - XVth Brigade Photographic Unit (Aug 1937 – Sep 1938) Archive
  - Connolly Column

== Notable members ==
- Bill Bailey – American communist labor activist and actor
- Ralph Bates – English novelist and first editor of Volunteer for Liberty newspaper
- Delmer Berg – American political activist
- Alvah Bessie – American screenwriter
- Archie Brown – American communist labor activist
- Edward A. Carter Jr. – American Medal of Honor recipient
- Robert Garland Colodny - American professor and historian
- Theodore Cogswell – American science fiction writer
- Fred Copeman – English battalion commander
- Milan Ćopić – Yugoslav prison warden
- Vladimir Ćopić – Yugoslav brigade commander
- Jock Cunningham – Scottish battalion commander
- Petar Dapčević – Yugoslav commander
- Malcolm Dunbar – British chief of staff
- Ralph Fasanella – American painter
- Janos Galicz – Hungarian division commander
- William Lindsay Gresham – American novelist, volunteer medic
- William Herrick – American novelist
- Gopal Mukund Huddar – Indian anti-colonial activist
- Jack Jones – English company commissar
- Oliver Law – American battalion commander
- James Maley – Scottish political activist
- Roland Masferrer – Cuban political activist
- Robert Hale Merriman – American brigade chief of staff
- Conlon Nancarrow – Mexican-American composer
- George Nathan – British brigade chief of staff
- Steve Nelson – American commissar
- Paddy O'Daire – Irish battalion commander
- Abe Osheroff – American activist
- Edwin Rolfe – American poet and editor of Volunteer for Liberty
- Frank Ryan – Irish commissar
- Milton Wolff – American author and commander of the Lincoln Battalion

=== Legacy ===
American Veterans of the XV Brigade collectively called themselves Veterans of the Abraham Lincoln Brigade (Spanish: Brigada Abraham Lincoln) when they returned from Spain. 2,800 Americans volunteered to fight for the Spanish Republic against the Nationalists in the Spanish Civil War. The Americans were chiefly organized into two battalions (Lincoln Battalion, Washington Battalion) that were assigned to the XV International Brigade (XV Brigada Internacional)

== See also ==
- List of military units named after people
- American Medical Bureau
