= Walter Garland =

Walter Garland may refer to:

- Hank Garland (Walter Louis Garland), American guitarist and songwriter
- Walter Benjamin Garland, American soldier, activist, and politician
