= Oliver Law =

American labor organizer (1900–1937)

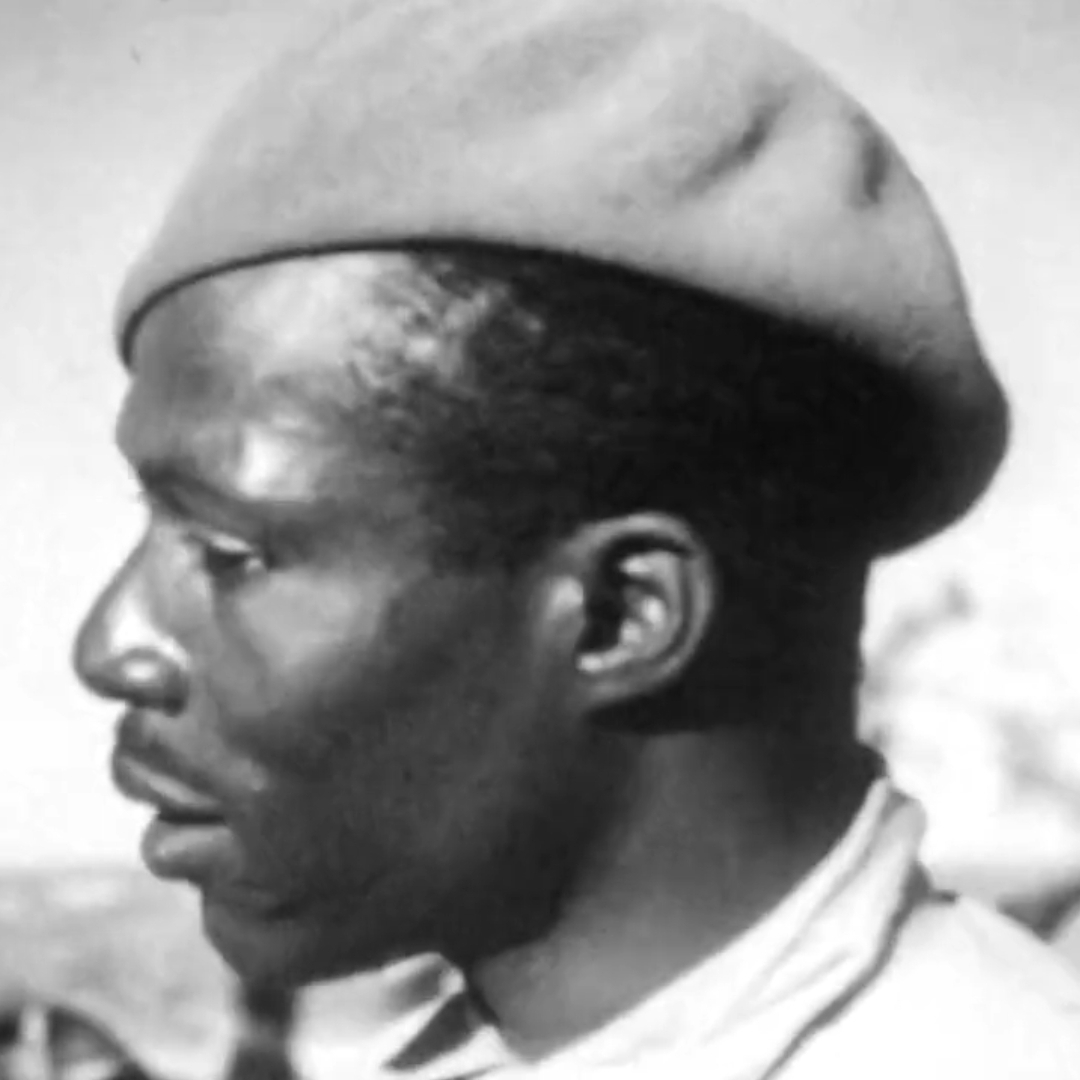
- Law in 1937
- Born: October 23, 1900; Matagorda, Texas, U.S.
- Died: July 9, 1937 (aged 36); Brunete, Spain
- Cause of death: Killed in action
- Spouse: Corrine Booker Light-foot
- Military career
- Allegiance: United States; Spanish Republic
- Branch: United States Army; International Brigades
- Service years: 1919–1925; 1937
- Rank: Private; Battalion Commander
- Units: 24th Infantry Regiment; The "Abraham Lincoln" XV International Brigade
- Commands: Lincoln Battalion
- Conflicts: Spanish Civil War; Battle of Jarama; Battle of Brunete †
- Political party: Communist Party USA
- Relatives: Claude Lightfoot (brother-in-law)

Oliver Law (October 23, 1900 – July 9, 1937) was an African American communist and labor organizer, who fought for the Republic in the Spanish Civil War. Having previously served in the United States Army, he traveled to Spain and became commander of the Abraham Lincoln Battalion for several days and commander of its Machine Gun Company for much longer.

== Background ==
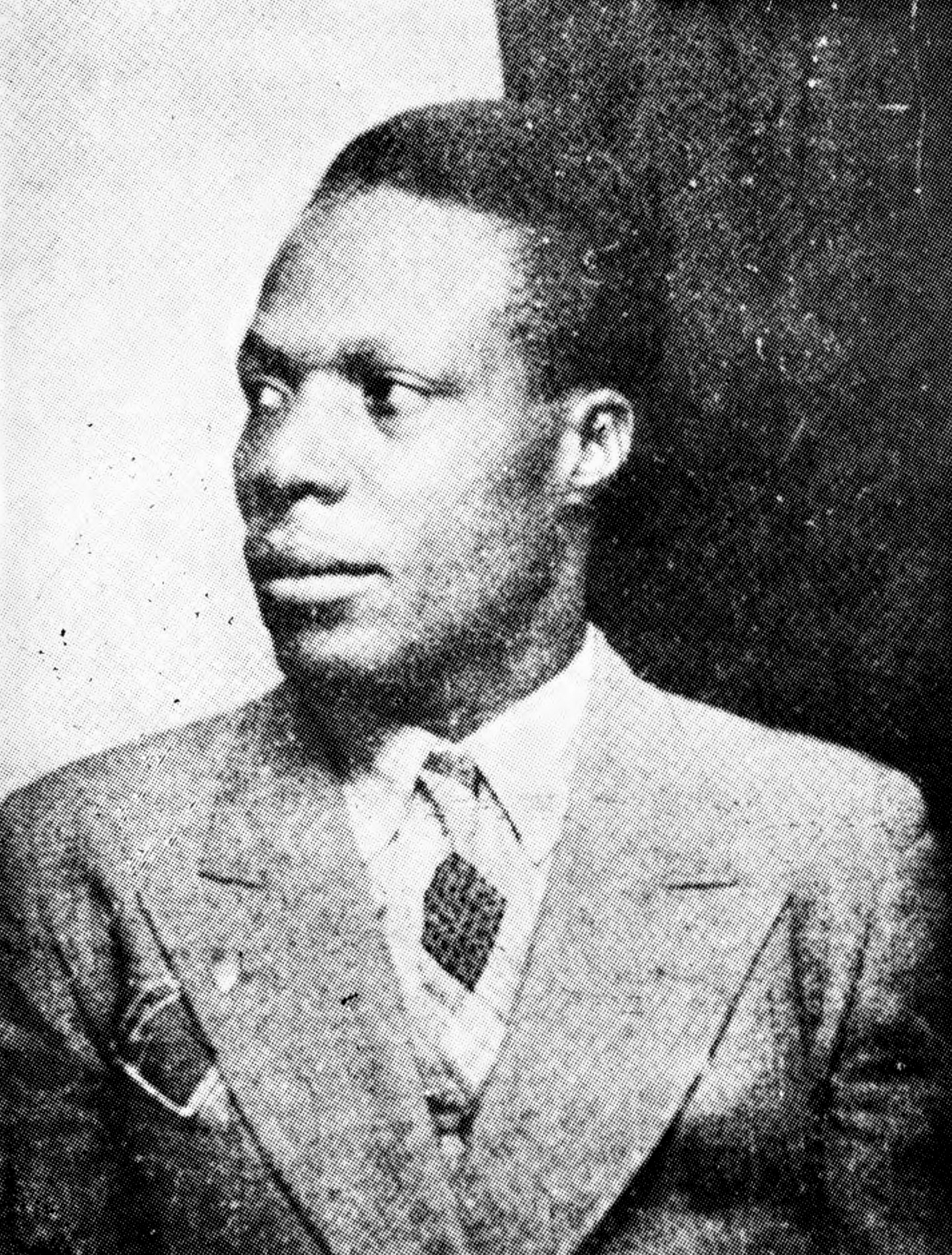
Law in civilian dress, undated

Born in Matagorda, Texas, Law joined the U.S. Army in 1919. He stayed on until 1925. He served as a private in the 24th Infantry Regiment, an African American outfit on the Mexican border. After leaving the army, he went to Bluffton, Indiana, where he worked in a cement plant. He moved on to Chicago, where he drove a taxi with the Yellow Cab Company. During the Great Depression he found work as a stevedore and joined the International Longshoremen's Association. He then tried his luck with a small restaurant, but failed and got a job with the Works Project Administration.

Law was a member of the International Labor Defense and joined the Communist Party USA (CPUSA) in 1932, serving as its candidate for State House in the 5th district in 1934. He was active in the unemployment movement in 1930, and worked with Harry Haywood to organize mass protests against Italy's occupation of Ethiopia in the Second Italo-Abyssinian War. He was arrested speaking at a demonstration in Chicago on August 31, 1935.

Law was married to Corrine Booker Lightfoot, sister of the regional CPUSA leader Claude Lightfoot.

== Spanish Civil War ==
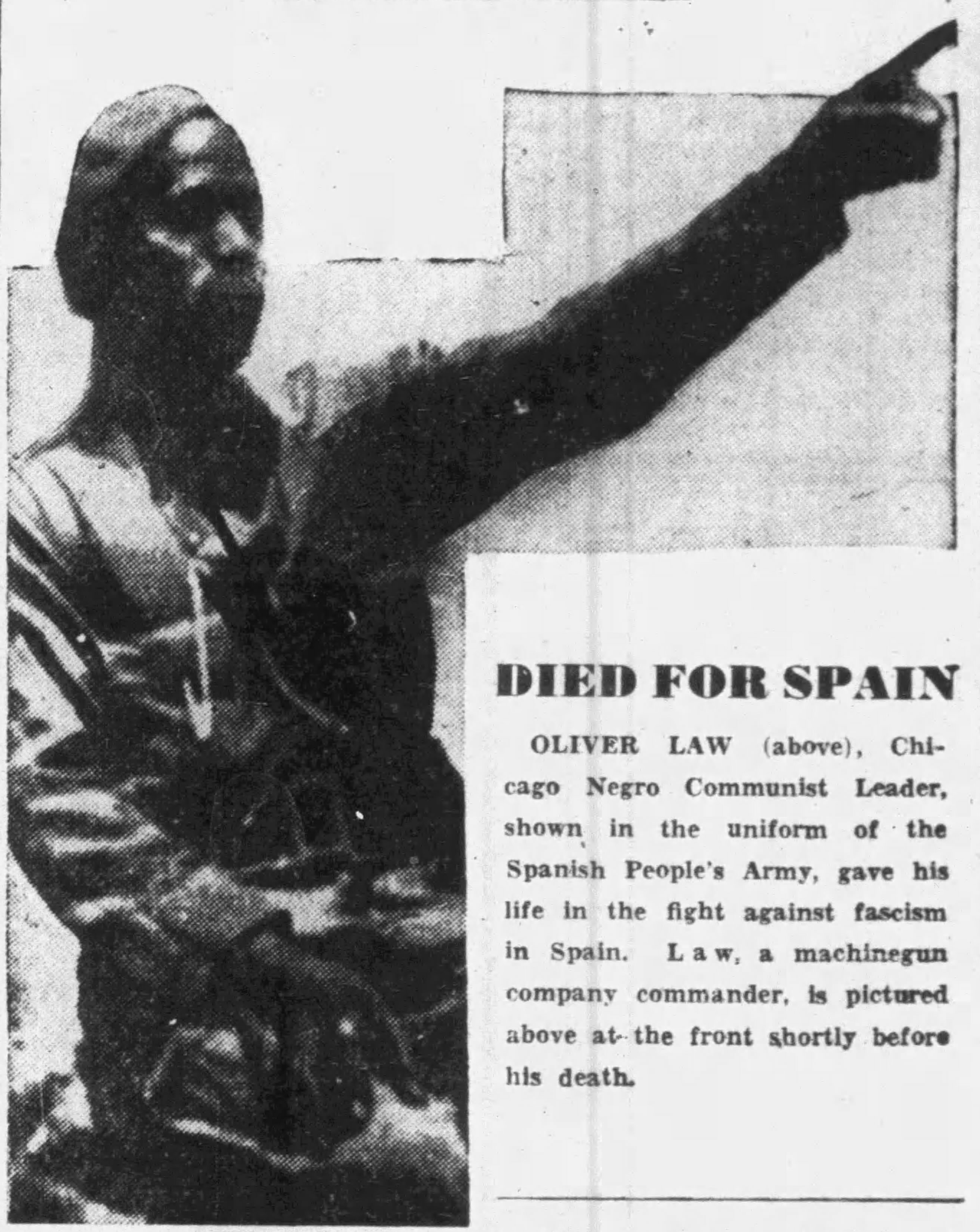
Law in a clipping from the Daily Worker, February 12, 1938

In 1936 Law joined the Abraham Lincoln Brigade. He arrived in Spain on January 16, 1937, to fight for the Popular Front against Francisco Franco and the Nationalists. Having met the International Brigades at Albacete, Law first served as a group leader of a machine-gun company engaged on the Jarama front. There were three group leaders, under the two section leaders and the company officers.

After failing to take Madrid by frontal assault, General Francisco Franco gave orders for the road that linked the city to the rest of Republican Spain to be cut. A Nationalist force of 40,000 men, including men from the Army of Africa, crossed the Jarama River on February 11, 1937. General José Miaja sent three International Brigades to the Jarama Valley to block the advance. Law first saw action on February 17. After disastrous setbacks on February 27, Law had performed well on the day and was soon promoted to section leader. Two weeks later he was made commander of the machine-gun company, when his superior officer was killed. The battalion leadership was annihilated at Jarama and Law advanced fast in rank, even though there was some criticism of his performance at the attack on Villanueva de la Cañada.

The experienced battalion commander Martin Hourihan recognized Law's abilities and wanted to send him to officer's training school. When Hourihan became ill, Law was chosen to replace him temporarily. After Houridan transferred permanently to the regimental staff, the choice of battalion commander was between Law and Walter Garland, who was still recovering from wounds, and Law was chosen and led the Abraham Lincoln Battalion in the first days of the Battle of Brunete. At the beginning of July the Popular Front government launched a major attack to relieve the threat to Madrid. General Vicente Rojo Lluch sent the Republican Army to Brunete, challenging Nationalist control of the western approaches to the capital. The 80,000 Republican soldiers made good early progress, but they were brought to a halt when Franco brought up his reserves.

The Internationals also suffered heavy losses. Oliver Law was killed on July 9, leading his men in an attack on Mosquito Crest (Mosquito Hill).
