= John Gates =

American communist (1913–1992)

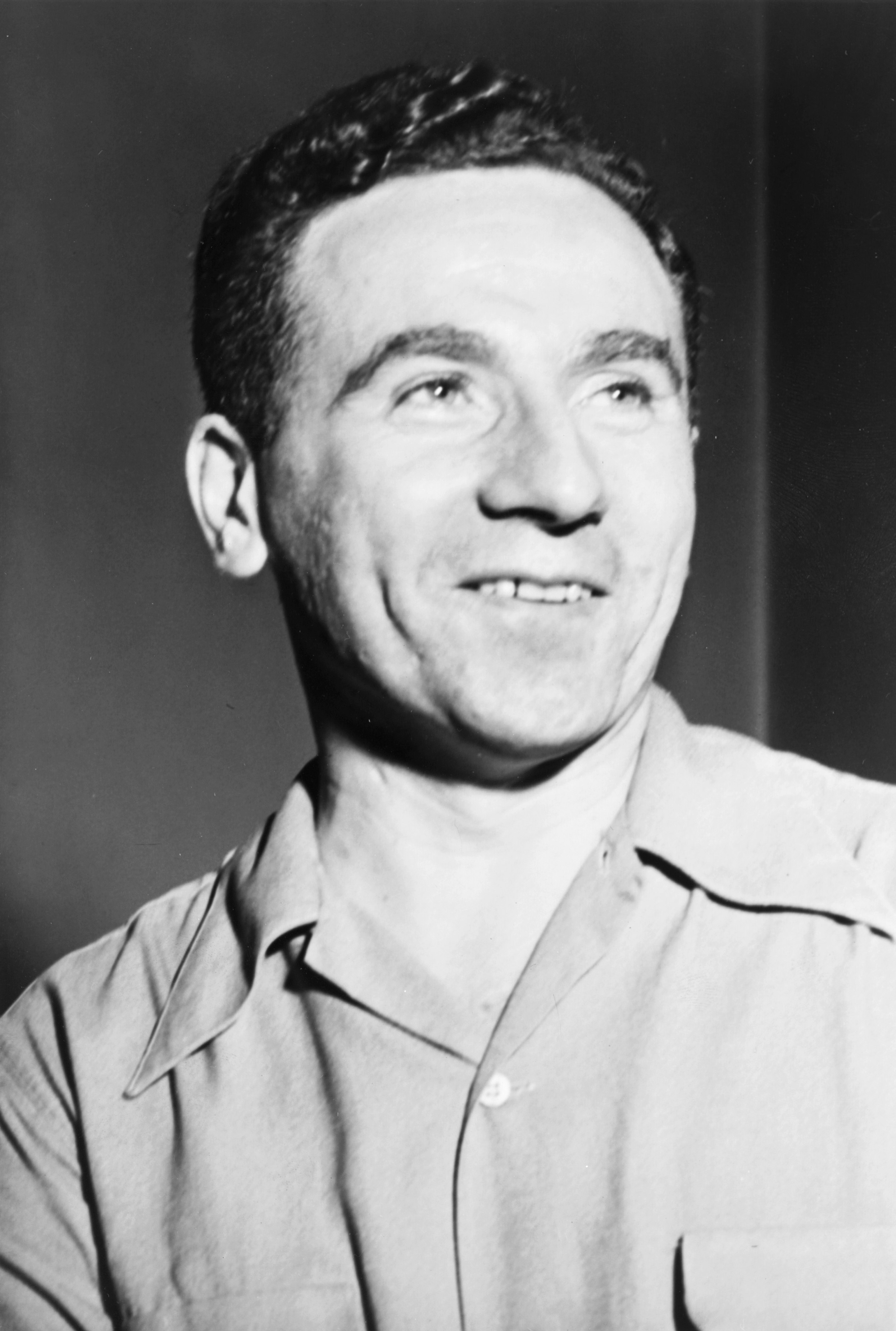
- Gates in 1948
- Born: Solomon Regenstreif; September 28, 1913; New York City, U.S.
- Died: May 23, 1992 (aged 78); Miami Beach, Florida, U.S.
- Education: City College of New York
- Occupation: Journalist
- Political party: Communist (1930–1958)
- Spouse: Lillian Schwartz
- Military career
- Allegiance: Spanish Republic; United States
- Branch: International Brigades; United States Army
- Service years: 1937–1938; 1941–1946
- Rank: Battalion Commissar; First Sergeant
- Units: The "Abraham Lincoln" XV International Brigade; 6th Armored Division; 17th Airborne Division
- Conflicts: Spanish Civil War; World War II; Aleutian Islands Campaign

John "Johnny" Gates (born Solomon Regenstreif; September 28, 1913 – May 23, 1992) was an American communist functionary and journalist, best remembered as one of the individuals spearheading a failed attempt at liberalization of the Communist Party USA in 1957.

== Early life ==
Solomon Regenstreif, better known by the Anglo-Saxon name he later adopted, John Gates, was born in Manhattan, New York on September 28, 1913, the son of ethnic Jewish parents who hailed from Poland.

== Career ==
Gates joined the Communist Party in 1930 while attending the City College of New York. Active in the campaign to free the Scottsboro Boys, Gates left college prior to graduation so that he could pursue his radical political activism. Gates first worked with unemployed workers in Ohio, eventually running unsuccessfully for the city council of Youngstown.

=== Spanish Civil War ===
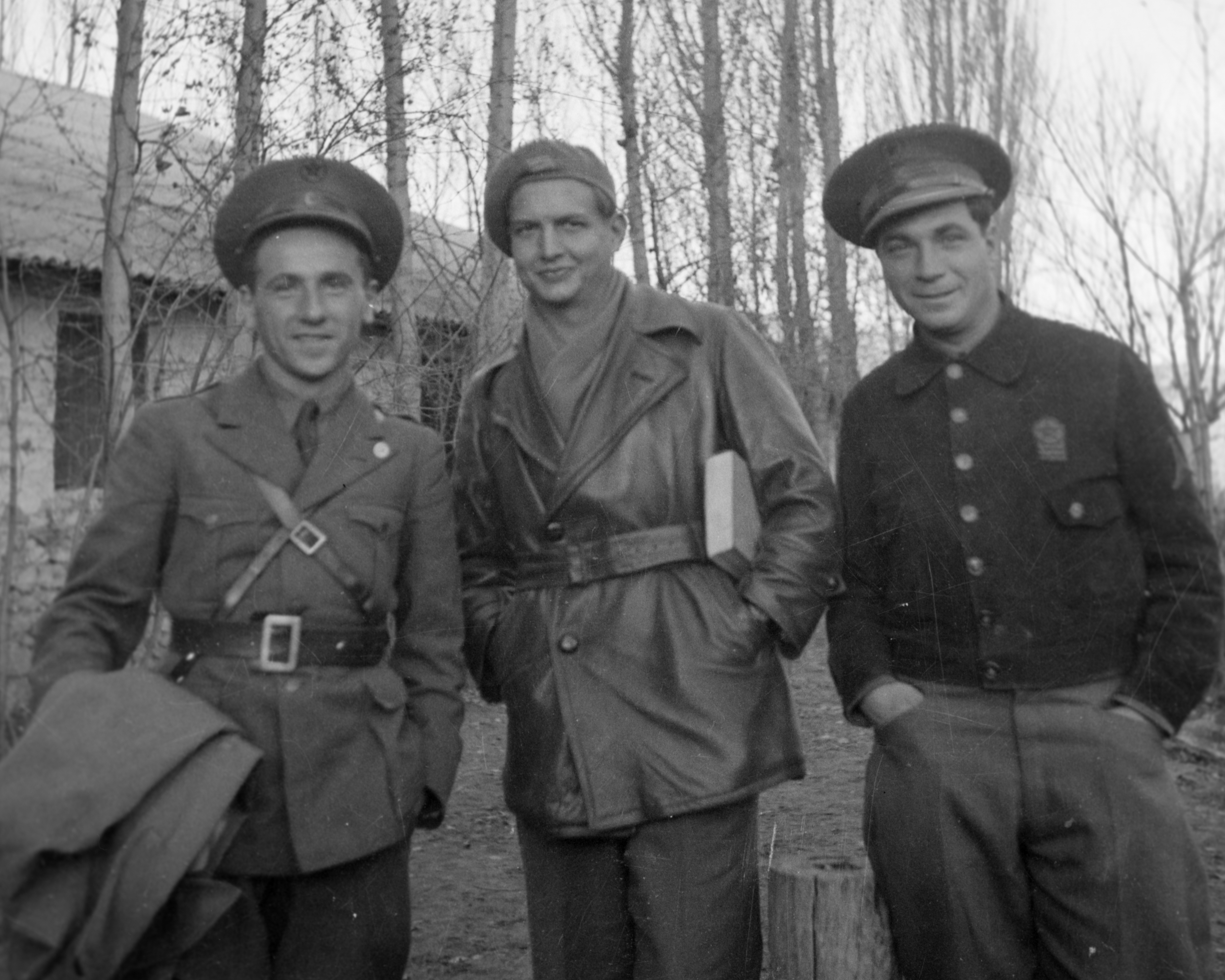
Gates (left) with fellow YCL leaders Robert G. Thompson (middle) and Dave Doran (right), 1937

When the Spanish Civil War broke out, Gates joined the Abraham Lincoln Brigade and fought in Spain. In March 1938, at the age of 24, Gates rose to the rank of battalion political commissar of the Lincoln-Washington Battalion. In this capacity, Gates gained a reputation as a strict disciplinarian. He later admitted he had gone somewhat overboard. In 1938, he was involved in the controversial decision to execute a deserter named Paul White who had left the lines before having a change of heart and returning, only to be executed for disciplinary reasons. The decision caused great dissension in the Lincoln Brigade's ranks, forcing the immediate declaration that no further executions would take place.

=== Political career ===
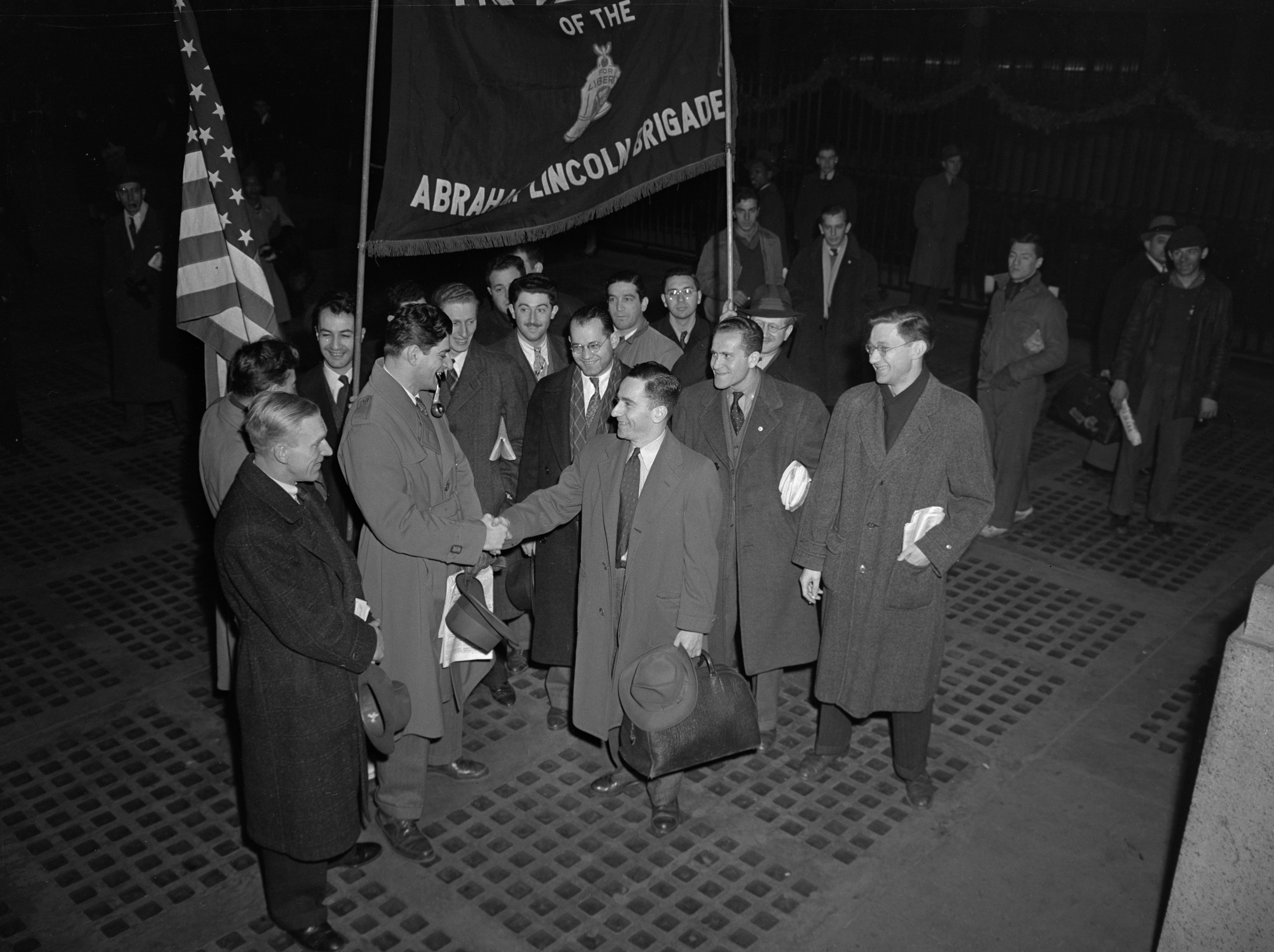
Members of the Veterans of the Abraham Lincoln Brigade and their national commander, Milton Wolff (left), give a sendoff to Gates as he leaves Grand Central Station for boot camp, December 20, 1941

Returning to the United States from Spain, Gates became executive secretary of the New York State Young Communist League in 1940 and editor of the Communist Party's newspaper, the Daily Worker, in 1947.

The week after the Japanese attack on Pearl Harbor in December 1941, Gates enlisted in the U.S. Army. He was denied the opportunity to serve overseas, and was instead assigned to the 209th Field Artillery in the Aleutian Islands. He finished the war as a first sergeant.

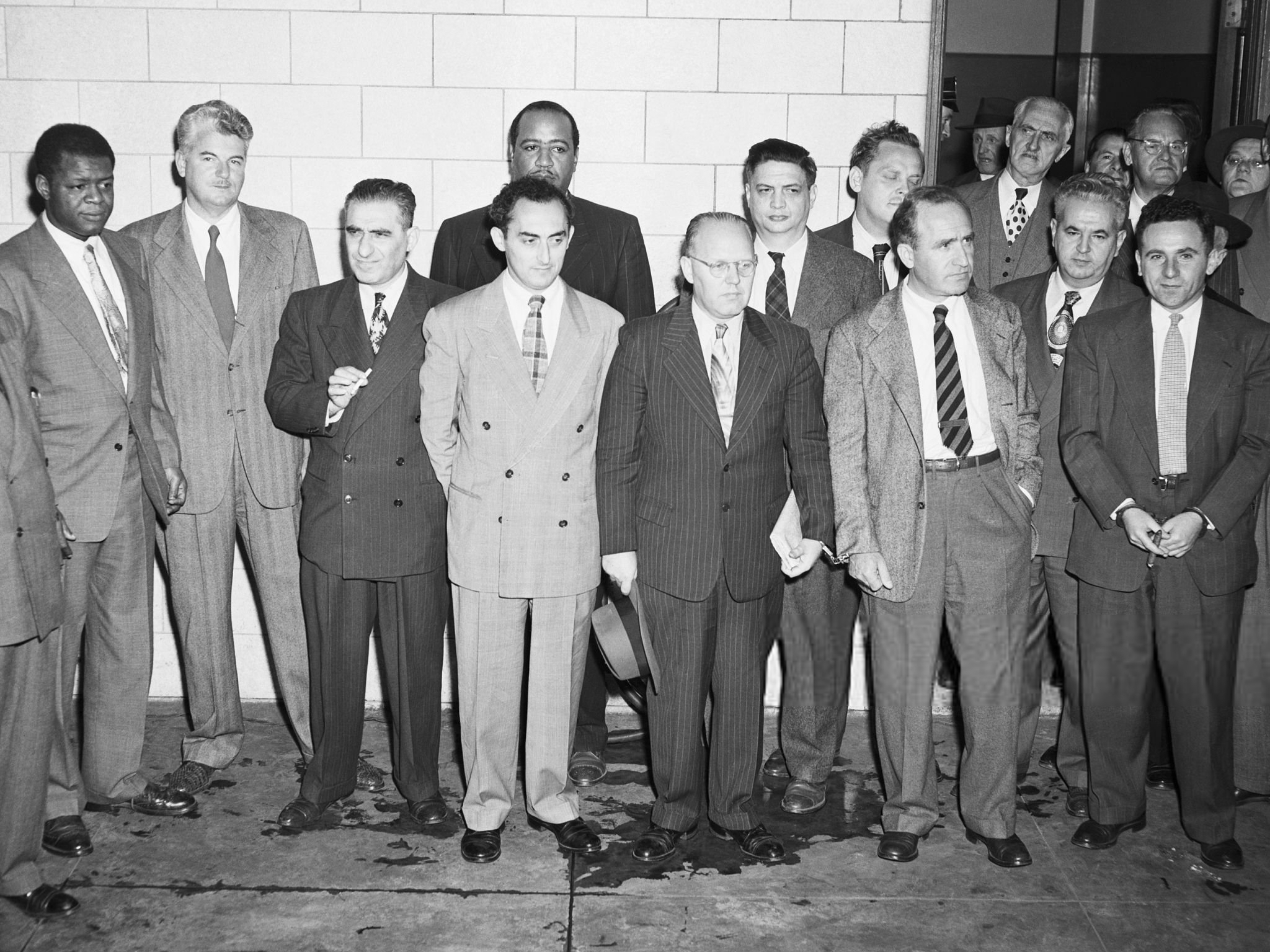
The Communists convicted in the Smith Act trials stand outside Foley Square Courthouse following the verdict, December 6, 1949. (L-R): Henry Winston, Eugene Dennis, Jack Stachel, Gil Green, Benjamin J. Davis Jr., John Williamson, Robert G. Thompson, Gus Hall, Irving Potash, Carl Winter and John Gates.

In the summer of 1948, Gates was one of 12 "kingpin Commies" (to borrow a colorful contemporary turn of phrase from Time magazine) indicted under the Smith Act for being "dedicated to the Marxist–Leninist principles of the overthrow and destruction of the Government ... by force and violence." Although the Smith Act had been implemented eight years earlier at the time of the Molotov–Ribbentrop Pact for the altogether different purpose of fighting potential infiltration of America by secret Nazi and communist saboteurs, at the height of the Cold War the existing law was used as a tool against national officials of the Communist Party. Prosecution of the ailing 67-year-old William Z. Foster was eventually dropped, but Gates and ten others were convicted in 1949 and sentenced to five years in prison.

Following his release from prison in 1955, Gates was again appointed editor of the Daily Worker. In that capacity, Gates' editorial policy soon came to set him at odds with the party leadership, he took liberal positions embracing Nikita Khrushchev's criticisms of Joseph Stalin and opposing the Soviet Union's suppression of the Hungarian Revolution of 1956. Party leaders were particularly upset by his support of Howard Fast, a prominent writer who was quite critical of the Soviet Union and soon after also left the Communist Party.

However, The Daily Worker was in deep trouble with significant losses in circulation due to a general disenchantment with communism, by both workers and intellectuals, and pressure from McCarthyism. Confronted with deep deficits and its inability to control Gates, on December 22, 1957, the Party suspended publication of the paper as a daily, the last daily issue appearing January 13, 1958.

=== Resignation ===
Gates resigned from the Party on January 10, 1958, claiming that it had "ceased to be an effective force for democracy, peace, and socialism in the United States." He was joined by managing editor Alan Max, negro affairs editor Abner Berry, and sports editor Lester Rodney. He set to work writing his memoirs, The Story of an American Communist, tapping fellow ex-communist pariah Earl Browder to write the book's introduction.

In a January 18, 1958, television interview with Mike Wallace, Gates attempted to illuminate his interlocutor on the nature of the power relationship between the Communist Party of the Soviet Union and the American communist movement:

[Y]ou have to understand how and why [the CPUSA] followed [Moscow's] line. It's not a matter that someone gave orders over there and we followed it over here. It's much more subtle than that. We followed that line because we thought it was right. It's more or less like a relationship between two people. One is an aggressive, brilliant personality and the other worships that person, and that person becomes sort of an idol for him and he tends to imitate and ape everything that he does. Well that kind of relationship is a bad relationship for both people."

Gates cited the American Communist Party's failure to declare its independence from Moscow as decisive in his decision to leave the organization.

Following publication of his memoirs, Gates went to work as a senior research assistant for the International Ladies Garment Workers Union (ILGWU). In this capacity, Gates helped members with workers' compensation, unemployment, and Social Security claims. He retired from the union in 1987.

== Death ==
Johnny Gates died on May 23, 1992, in Miami Beach, Florida, at the age of 78. He was survived by his wife of 47 years, the former Lillian Schwartz; a brother, Nat Regenstreif, of Hollywood, Florida, and three sisters, Blanche Smiles of the Bronx, Irene Travis of Charlotte, North Carolina, and Marlene Seml of Boca Raton, Florida.

== Works ==
- The South: The Nation's Problem. New York: New Century Publishers, 1948.
- On Guard against Browderism, Titoism, Trotskyism. New York: New Century Publishers, 1951.
- What America Needs: A Communist View. With Eugene Dennis. New York: New Century Publishers, March 1956.
- Evolution of an American Communist: Why I Quit after 27 Years: Where I Stand Now. New York: J. Gates, 1958
- A Case Study on the Communist Conspiracy, April 23, 1958. With Herbert Philbrick. Dallas: Southern Methodist University Forum Committee, 1958.
- The Story of an American Communist. Introduction by Earl Browder. New York: Thomas Nelson & Sons, 1958.
