= Leo Eloesser =

American surgeon

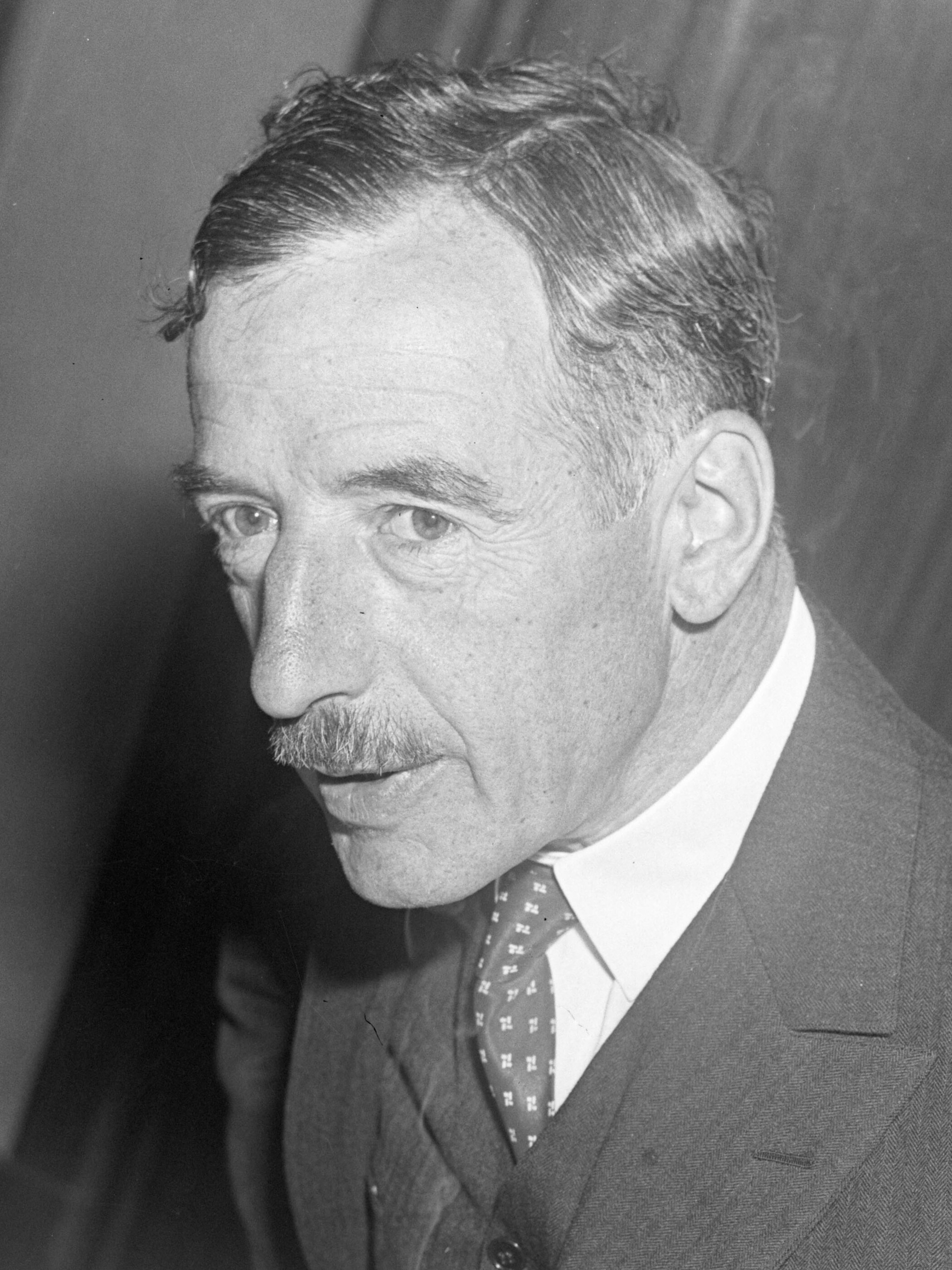
Eloesser in 1938

Leo Eloesser (July 29, 1881 – October 4, 1976), a noted thoracic surgeon and volunteer of the Lincoln Battalion in the Spanish Civil War, was born in San Francisco. He spent his undergraduate years at Berkeley and in 1901 went to Germany to study medicine. He became a pioneer in the field of thoracic surgery and joined the faculty of the Stanford Medical School in 1912. A surgical procedure known as the Eloesser flap is named for him.

Known for his work among the poor and indigent, Dr. Eloesser served as the physician for Tom Mooney, whose trial and imprisonment on charges stemming from a 1916 bombing made him a cause célèbre of the American Left. He met Diego Rivera in 1926 and became Frida Kahlo's lifelong friend and medical adviser. In the Spanish Civil War, he saw service with the Lincoln Battalion at Teruel and on the Ebro front with his own Mobile Surgical Hospital.

At the end of World War II he was in China with the Eighth Route Army under the auspices of UNICEF. Eloesser wrote a manual for use in Chinese midwifery training courses, Pregnancy, Childbirth and the Newborn: A Manual for Rural Midwives which was published in Spanish, English, and Portuguese. In the 1960s, it influenced Ina May Gaskin, author of Spiritual Midwifery (1977), and others in the U.S. midwifery movement.

Eloesser spent the last 25 years of his life in Mexico with his companion, Joyce Campbell.
