= Edwin Rolfe =

American poet and journalist (1909–1954)

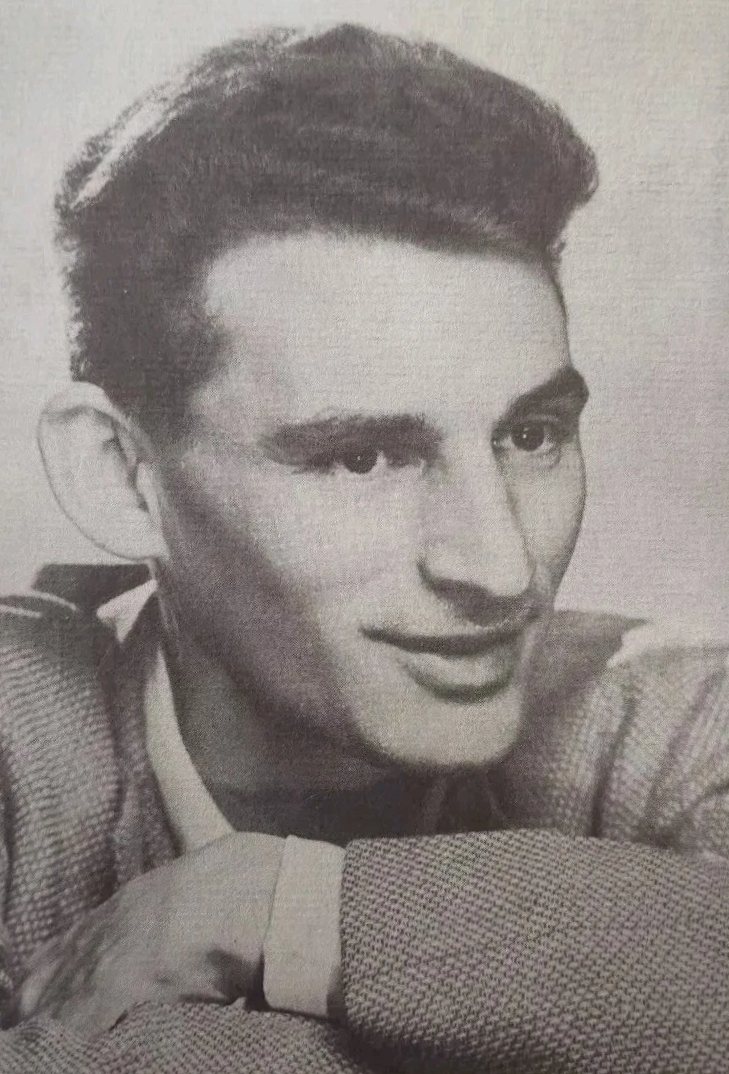
- Rolfe in Permit Me Refuge
- Born: Solomon Fishman; September 7, 1909; Philadelphia, Pennsylvania
- Died: May 24, 1954 (aged 44); Hollywood, California
- Education: City College of New York; University of Wisconsin
- Occupations: Poet; journalist; screenwriter
- Spouse: Mary Wolfe (m. 1936)

Edwin Rolfe (September 7, 1909 – May 24, 1954) was an American poet, journalist, communist, Spanish Civil War veteran, and screenwriter. He was dubbed "the poet laureate of the Abraham Lincoln Battalion"—the group of Americans who fought alongside the Soviet-backed Spanish Republicans against the Nazi-backed fascist forces of Francisco Franco and his Nationalist faction.

== Early life ==
Rolfe was born Solomon Fishman in Philadelphia in 1909, the first of three sons. His parents were Russian Jewish immigrants who met through a marriage broker and wed in 1908. Both parents were politically active, with his mother involved in the suffrage and birth control movements, and his father a labor organizer, union officer, and committed socialist. In 1915, the family moved to New York City. Solomon attended New Utrecht High School and contributed to the school magazine, The Comet. He eventually became its editor, succeeding his close friend Leo Hurwitz. During these formative years, Solomon began to use pseudonyms in his writings, and eventually settled on "Edwin Rolfe".

== Poetry career ==
His first collected poems appeared in an anthology with three other poets. The volume was called We Gather Strength (1933). Other poetry collections of his followed, none of which were conventionally published: To My Contemporaries (1936) was put out by the small Dynamo Press after receiving contributions from Archibald MacLeish and others; First Love, and Other Poems (1951) was sold to subscribers; Permit Me Refuge (1955), with a foreword by poet Thomas McGrath, was published posthumously by California Quarterly. Its editor Philip Stevenson solicited donations from Rolfe's friends (such as blacklisted screenwriter Albert Maltz) to pay for publication costs.

Rolfe's poems were inseparable from the historical events swirling around him. His poetry was his intellectual and emotional response to the Great Depression, Spanish Civil War, and Second Red Scare.

== Political engagement ==
While a teenager in 1924, Rolfe joined the Young Communist League. He would later join the Communist Party (CPUSA) in 1933. Between 1927 and 1939, he contributed poems, cartoons, book reviews, and journalistic pieces to the CPUSA-affiliated publications New Masses and The Daily Worker. He reported on the Sacco and Vanzetti case for the latter publication. During the late 1920s and early '30s, Rolfe was mentored by older radical writers such as Mike Gold and Joseph Freeman.

== Spanish Civil War ==
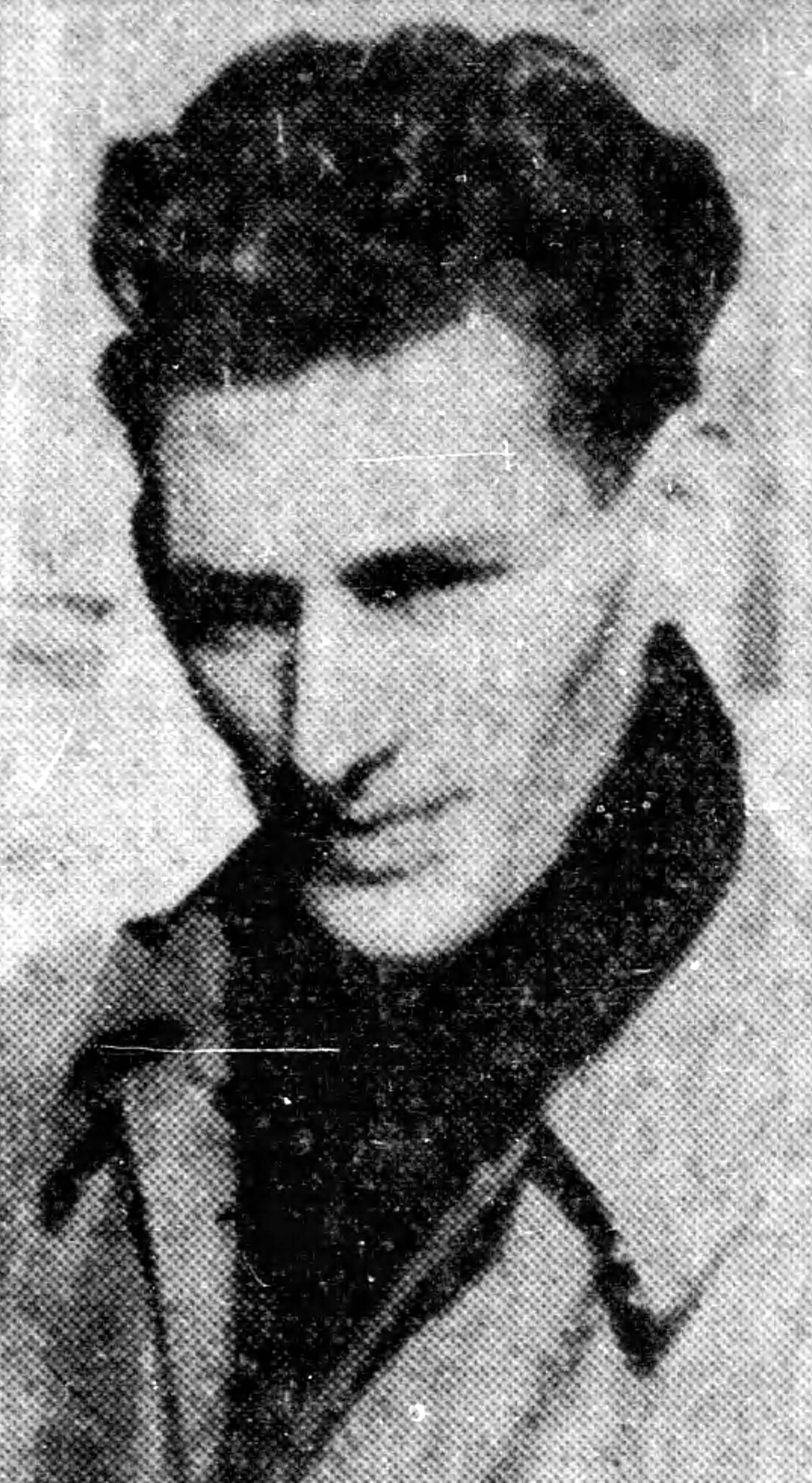
Rolfe c. 1939

In autumn of 1936, Rolfe married his longtime girlfriend Mary Wolfe. In June 1937, he traveled to Spain to fight against the growing threat of European fascism. Upon arrival, he trained as a soldier with the Lincoln Battalion in Tarazona de la Mancha. However, by July he was temporarily assigned to be American political commissar in Madrid. Then, later in July, he was asked to serve as editor of Volunteer for Liberty, the weekly newspaper of the International Brigades. In 1938, he was finally allowed to "quit the desk job" and become a soldier in the Lincoln Battalion, eventually taking part in the Battle of the Ebro in summer of 1938.

Prior to the battle, while training at a camp near the Ebro River, the novelist and future screenwriter Alvah Bessie—also a Lincoln Battalion volunteer—met Rolfe unexpectedly:

[I] met a new recruit. He said his name was Rolfe; I looked at him. "Edwin Rolfe?" I said, and he said, "Yes." "The Edwin Rolfe? The poet?" "The same," he said. "Christ!" I said ... He was frail; he resembled a bird; he had a fine, delicate bone structure and he did not look as though he should be in an army. I asked him what he was doing here and how he liked it, and he said it was pretty tough at first, but that he liked it fine... I do not think I have ever met a gentler guy, a less pugnacious guy, less of a soldier. But he had the iron of conviction in him just the same. He had a tiny automatic pistol some one had given him, and it became him, though I could not imagine him ever using it. I felt better to have another writer on the spot.

While in Spain, Rolfe befriended Ernest Hemingway and Langston Hughes and maintained lasting correspondences with both men.

Upon returning to the U.S. in January 1939, Rolfe was commissioned by Random House to write a factual account of the Spanish Civil War. His book, The Lincoln Battalion: The Story of the Americans Who Fought in Spain in the International Brigades (1939), is considered to be the first such history. The book was praised for its insightful passages about the American volunteers, as illustrated here:

Just what it was that sent each single one of these Americans across the Atlantic to fight for the independence of Spain will never be completely known. The bridge between the impulse and the act is a highly personal process, one that men rarely divulge to others, even when they themselves are conscious enough to trace its intricate path. There is a no-man's land between conviction and action into which the great majority of humankind never venture. Today, the final determining factor which set each single one of the Americans in motion on this democratic crusade has died with 1,000 of them. The others, who have returned, will probably guard some small part of the secret all their lives.

In 1940, unable to obtain other work, Rolfe accepted an offer for $45 a week at the New York office of TASS, the Soviet news agency. He was soon running their Latin American desk, using the Spanish language fluency he acquired in Spain. Given the delicate nature of the U.S.-Soviet WWII alliance, TASS required its U.S. employees to be "uncontroversial". That meant Rolfe had to cease all CPUSA activities, and he was prohibited from publishing any of his own writings, a restriction he found onerous since he had been completing new poems about his war experiences.

== World War II and after ==
Following the U.S. entrance into World War II, Rolfe was conscripted into the Army. In February 1943, he reported to Camp Wolters, Texas. Because he had volunteered to fight fascism in Spain, Rolfe was categorized as a politically suspicious "premature anti-fascist". When he arrived at Camp Wolters, he was met by Federal Bureau of Investigation (FBI) agents. Like other Spanish Civil War veterans, Rolfe was barred from becoming an officer in the U.S. Armed Forces. He was assigned to an anti-tank gun battalion in the infantry. He found basic training "tough as hell on a 33-yr-old" competing with recruits who were 18-20 years old. He survived the training but a couple months later, while out on maneuvers, he collapsed from amoebic dysentery (the doctor suggested he might have ingested an amoebic cyst in Spain). Rolfe spent a month in the camp hospital, and was medically discharged from the Army before seeing action overseas.

After the war, Rolfe resumed his literary work, co-authoring with Lester Fuller the 1946 mystery novel, The Glass Room. He relocated to Hollywood to adapt the novel for the screen. He was excited at the prospect—Humphrey Bogart and Lauren Bacall were set to star in the film—but ultimately the project never came to fruition. It may have been cancelled as a result of political pressure on Warner Bros. since Rolfe and Fuller were both CPUSA members. It turned out that Rolfe's only screenwriting credit would be for the 1951 film noir, The Scarf.

As he prepared the poems that would comprise his 1951 First Love volume, Rolfe's mind kept returning to the Spanish Civil War, like in these opening lines of "Elegia" (1948):

Madrid Madrid Madrid Madrid
I call your name endlessly, savor it like a lover.
Ten irretrievable years have exploded like bombs
since last I saw you, since last I slept
in your arms of tenderness and wounded granite.
Ten years since I touched your face in the sun,
ten years since the homeless Guadarrama winds
moaned like shivering orphans through your veins
and I moaned with them.

Although Rolfe and his wife remained in Hollywood, his hopes of earning a living as a screenwriter were thwarted by the blacklist. In 1951, he was named a Communist by two "friendly" witnesses appearing before the House Un-American Activities Committee (HUAC). In April 1952, he received an HUAC summons, but was able to avoid testifying thanks to a doctor's letter.

Meanwhile, Rolfe's health was failing. After suffering two minor heart attacks in 1944, he suffered his most severe one in July 1950 and was hospitalized until September. In his final years, Rolfe focused his energies on reworking earlier poems and writing new poems in response to the McCarthy Era. He died of a heart attack in May 1954 at age 44.

== Legacy ==
The poet Reginald Gibbons said that Rolfe's "[Spanish] Civil War poems may be the best written by an American writer." When the University of Illinois Press brought out a volume of Rolfe's collected poems, they called him "the poet laureate of the Abraham Lincoln Battalion".

In 1975, fellow Spanish Civil War veteran Alvah Bessie provided the following epitaph:

Edwin Rolfe, poet and author of the first history of the Lincoln Battalion, whose eloquent volume of poems, First Love, expressed what all of us have always felt about Spain, was in Hollywood, blacklisted and unemployable when he was taken by a heart attack on 25 May 1954. Two wars (for he was in the AUS [Army of the U.S.] also) were too much for so physically frail a man and unemployability added final insult to the injury.

== Bibliography ==
Poetry

- We Gather Strength. Poems by Herman Spector, Joseph Kalar, Edwin Rolfe, Sol Funaroff. Introduction by Mike Gold. New York: Liberal Press, 1933.
- To My Contemporaries. New York: Dynamo, 1936.
- First Love, and Other Poems. Los Angeles: Larry Edmunds Bookshop, 1951.
- Permit Me Refuge. Los Angeles: California Quarterly, 1955.
- Collected Poems: Edwin Rolfe (1909-54). Urbana: University of Illinois Press, 1997.

Fiction

- The Glass Room. New York: Rinehart, 1946. Co-authored with Lester Fuller. Reissued as a paperback in 1948 under the title, Murder in the Glass Room.

Non-fiction

- The Lincoln Battalion: The Story of the Americans Who Fought in Spain in the International Brigades. New York: Random House, 1939.
