= Lincoln Battalion =

Volunteer unit of the Second Spanish Republic

Lincoln Battalion Batallón Abraham Lincoln
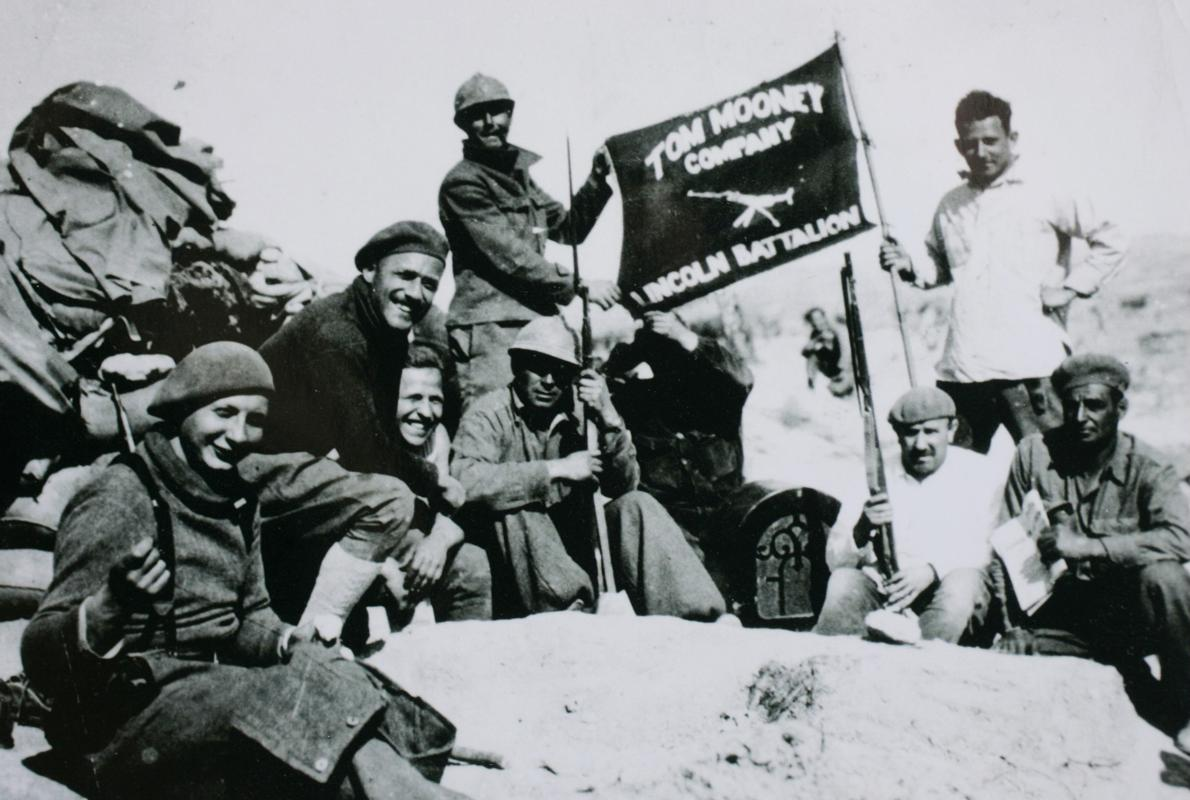
- The Lincoln Battalion, Tom Mooney Company
- Active: 1936–1938
- Country: United States
- Allegiance: Second Spanish Republic
- Branch: International Brigades
- Type: Battalion – infantry
- Role: Home Defence
- Size: • 2,500 troops
- Part of: XV International Brigade (1937–1939)
- Garrison/HQ: Albacete
- Patron: Abraham Lincoln
- March: Jarama Valley
- Engagements: Spanish Civil War
- Website: alba-valb.org

Commanders
- Notable commanders: Robert Hale Merriman; Milton Wolff

Insignia
- Flag of the Lincoln Battalion

- Flag of the Tom Mooney Company

The Lincoln Battalion (Spanish: Batallón Abraham Lincoln), the major component of what came to be known as the Abraham Lincoln Brigade, was the 17th (later the 58th) battalion of the XV International Brigade that fought in the Spanish Civil War. Named after United States President Abraham Lincoln, the battalion was organized by the Communist International. The XVth Brigade was one of many mixed brigades that comprised the International Brigades.

The Lincoln Battalion was formed by American volunteers who served as soldiers, technicians, medical personnel, and aviators alongside the Spanish Republican forces against the Nazi-supported forces of General Francisco Franco and his Nationalist faction. Unlike the segregated U.S. Army in the 1930s, the Lincoln Battalion integrated white and black soldiers on an equal basis. Of the approximately 3,000 American volunteers who went to Spain, 681 were killed in action or died of wounds or sickness.

== History ==
=== Creation ===
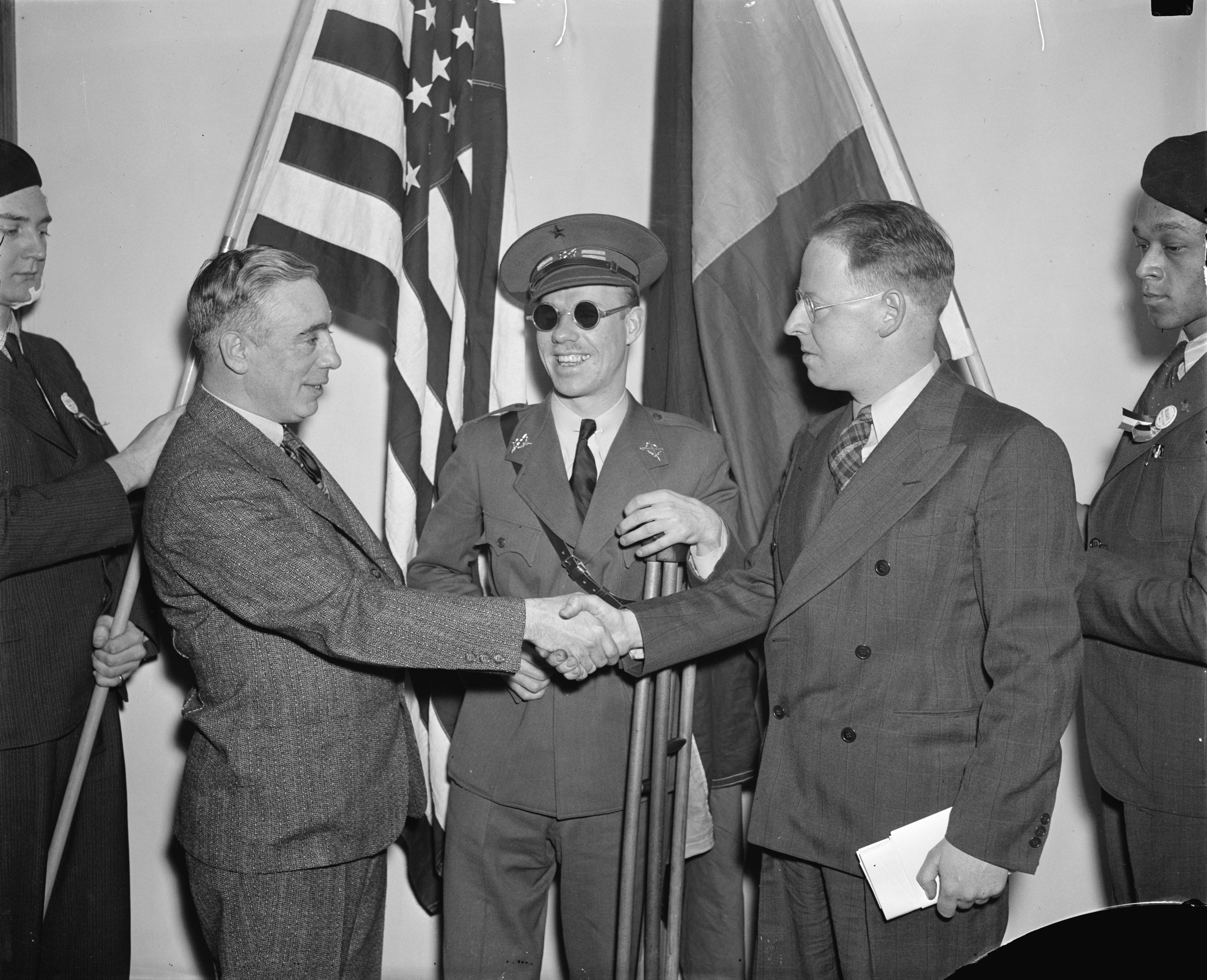
Washington, D.C., February 12, 1938. First National Conference of the Veterans of the Abraham Lincoln Brigade. From left to right: Francis J. Gorman, President of the United Textile Workers of America; Lieut. Robert Raven, wounded and blinded in Spain; and Commander Paul Burns.

The Spanish Civil War was fought from 17 July 1936 to 28 March 1939. The combatants were the Republicans—a political alliance referred to as the Popular Front, which was loyal to the Spanish Republic (hence, also referred to as the Loyalists)—and the Nationalists, a rebel movement led by General Francisco Franco, which was backed by the fascist countries in Europe. The Spanish Civil War's triggering event was the coup of July 1936 in which the Nationalists attempted to overthrow the elected Republican government.

On 26 July, less than ten days after the coup started, an international Communist conference was held in Prague to formulate plans to assist the Republicans. The conference attendees decided to raise a multinational brigade of 5,000 men and a fund of one billion francs. At the same time, Communist parties worldwide launched a full-scale propaganda campaign supporting the Popular Front. The Communist International soon joined the activity, sending to Spain its leader Georgi Dimitrov, as well as Palmiro Togliatti, the chief of the Communist Party of Italy. The Soviet Union began supplying aid to the Republicans in August 1936. Over one ship per day arrived at Spain's Mediterranean ports carrying munitions, rifles, machine guns, hand grenades, artillery, and trucks. With the cargo came Soviet agents, technicians, instructors, and propagandists.

The Communist International quickly started to organize the International Brigades, taking care to conceal or minimize the Communist character of the enterprise. In keeping with Popular Front culture, the Republican cause was portrayed as a struggle for progressive democracy, and the American soldiers in Spain named their units the Abraham Lincoln Battalion, the George Washington Battalion, and the John Brown Battery. Other countries used similar patriotic names, e.g., the Garibaldi Battalion from Italy. Besides the Americans who volunteered as soldiers, another 125 men and women served with the American Medical Bureau as nurses, doctors, and ambulance drivers.

=== 1937 ===
Seeking help to defeat the armed rebellion, the Republicans asked for volunteer fighters worldwide. The American volunteers, many of them Communists, started arriving in Spain in late 1936. Utilizing the name of Abraham Lincoln, they formed the Lincoln Battalion in January 1937 as part of the XV International Brigade. The battalion initially fielded three companies: two infantry and one machine gun. Sections of Latin American and Irish volunteers were also included, organized as the Centuria Guttieras and the Connolly Column, respectively. After less than two months of training, the Lincolns took action in February 1937. Many of the volunteers recalled that training was rudimentary: "They give me a gun, and they give me 100 bullets, and they send me to fight."

The International Brigades were usually deployed as shock troops, resulting in high casualties. As an example, the Lincoln Battalion lost 22.5% of its strength by war's end. The Lincolns were especially depleted by the Battle of Jarama. On 27 February 1937, the unit lost two-thirds of its forces, including commander Robert Hale Merriman (who was badly wounded) in a futile assault on Nationalist positions. Merriman had begged Lieutenant Colonel Vladimir Ćopić (described as "rather inept") not to launch the attack, fearing slaughter. Ćopić insisted it proceed and promised air and armored support, which never came. Merriman was almost immediately wounded, and the Lincolns suffered 136 deaths. The battalion remained in combat and was slowly rebuilt while maintaining its front-line positions. The unit was finally pulled out of the lines for a brief rest before the offensive at Brunete.

Joined by the newly trained George Washington Battalion, the XVth Brigade took action at Villanueva de la Cañada on the second day of the Brunete Offensive and secured the town after hard fighting. The Washingtons attacked the north end of the village, while the British and Dimitrov battalions attacked from the south.

The XVth Brigade then deployed against "Mosquito Ridge", but despite repeated assaults, they could not dislodge the Nationalist troops holding that critical piece of terrain. The Lincoln Battalion's commander Oliver Law—the first black commander of an integrated American army unit—was killed during this action. The XVth Brigade again sustained severe losses. Due to the high rate of casualties, the Lincoln and Washington Battalions were merged. Thereafter, the unit was officially known as the Lincoln-Washington Battalion, though it was more commonly referred to as the Lincoln Battalion.

From August–October 1937, the Lincoln-Washington Battalion fought in a series of battles in the Aragon Offensive. It fought well at both Quinto and Belchite. The engagement at Quinto was a combined arms action as the Lincoln-Washington Battalion was led into their second assault on the town by Soviet tanks, T-26 tanks, and Soviet crews. Belchite was a hard battle with house-to-house fighting that produced heavy casualties.

After Belchite, the XVth Brigade was again reorganized. The newly formed Canadian MacKenzie-Papineau Battalion joined the brigade, and the veteran Dimitrov Battalion departed. A majority of the volunteers in the "Mac-Paps" were Americans. On 13 October 1937, the XVth Brigade fought at Fuentes de Ebro. Men from the brigade's 24th (Spanish) Battalion rode Russian tanks into the attack. The remaining battalions were supposed to follow the tanks, but the attack fell apart because they did not coordinate their advance with the infantry. Casualties were especially heavy in the 24th and MacKenzie-Papineau Battalions. After Fuentes, the XVth Brigade was pulled back to a reserve position, receiving its first extended period of rest and relaxation since going into combat at Jarama.

In late December, the Lincoln-Washington Battalion was alerted for service at Teruel. The XVth Brigade was deployed to hold the recently captured city of Teruel against the expected Nationalist counterattack. The winter of 1937/38 was among the coldest on record, and many troops suffered frostbite during the campaign. The Lincoln-Washington's initially held positions overlooking Teruel that they called the North Pole. Later, they moved down into the city. During January, the Nationalists launched coordinated attacks against the Republican defenses. The XVth Brigade's British Battalion and MacKenzie-Papineau Battalion both lost an entire company attempting to hold the territory. Nationalist superiority in both numbers and materiel eventually pushed the XVth Brigade out of Teruel. The XV BDE, including the Lincoln-Washington Battalion, were pulled out of the line for rest after three weeks in the lines. But before the units could get to the rest areas, their trains and trucks were stopped, and they were redeployed to the front, where they participated in an offensive that was expected to relieve some of the pressure on Teruel. In a dawn attack, the XVth Brigade attacked a series of Nationalist fortifications at Segura de los Baños. While the attack succeeded, the Nationalist forces did not transfer any forces away from Teruel.

=== 1938-1939 ===
A political button worn by supporters of the unit

March found the Lincoln-Washington in reserve positions in Aragon. Their rest proved short-lived as the XVth Brigade was swept up in the disaster known as "The Retreats". Nationalist forces punched through the Republican lines and drove to the sea, cutting the Republic in two. The Lincoln-Washington Battalion was dispersed, reformed, and dispersed again in a confused series of holding actions and retreats in which it lost most of its personnel killed, captured, or missing. Robert Merriman and Dave Doran, two of the highest-ranking American officers in the XVth Brigade, were presumed captured and executed as Nationalist forces normally executed all international prisoners. The remnants of the Battalion gathered on the far side of the Ebro River, where they were slowly reconstituted with a limited number of international volunteers from the hospitals and rear areas.

Spanish troops, many young conscripts, were drafted into the XVth Brigade's battalions to bring them fully up to strength. Spaniards were integrated into the Lincoln Battalion as early as Jarama. Spanish companies were added to the international battalions as the flow of volunteers from North America decreased. After the Retreats, Spanish troops were integrated across all battalions and comprised most of the XVth Brigade's strength in its last action.

In July 1938, the rebuilt Lincoln-Washington Battalion participated in the Ebro offensive. The XVth Brigade crossed the Ebro and rapidly advanced across the territory they had retreated through in March and April. However, the Nationalist forces quickly rallied, and the offensive stalled. The Republican troops returned to the defensive, contesting the area captured in the offensive.

On 21 September 1938, Juan Negrín, the Spanish prime minister, announced to the League of Nations the unilateral withdrawal of the International Brigades from battle. Juan Negrín was trying to negotiate peace as his only hope. He had been informed that the International Brigades were no longer of military value, Although he maintained a vain hope that the Nationalists would withdraw their German and Italian troops, Franco kept his German and Italian forces until the war's end.

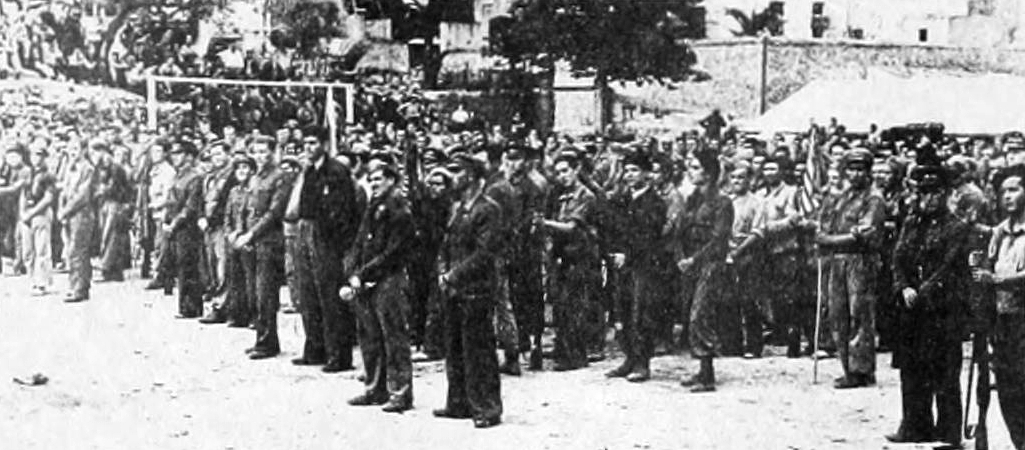
The last parade of the Abraham Lincoln Brigade, 1938

On 1 November 1938, International Brigadists received a warm farewell from the people in Barcelona, where 250,000 people gathered to say goodbye to the international brigades for freedom. In a famous farewell speech, Dolores Ibárruri, "La Pasionaria", declared: "You are history. You are legend. You are the heroic example of democracy's solidarity and universality in the face of the vile and accommodating spirit of those who interpret democratic principles with their eyes on hoards of wealth or corporate shares which they want to safeguard from all risk."

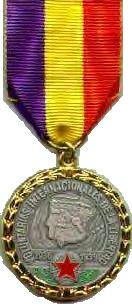
Spanish Civil War Medal awarded to the International Brigades

Surviving Americans from across Spain were sent to Ripoll, where the International Red Cross and the US government verified their nationality before repatriating them. Many were able to participate in the farewell activities, including a parade in Barcelona where the International Brigades were officially disbanded. Most American volunteers returned to the US between December 1938 and January 1939. American POWs were released after the fall of the Republican government, although the last POWs did not arrive in the United States until September 1939.

== Composition ==
3,015 Americans manned the Lincoln Battalion and its successor, the Lincoln-Washington Battalion. While several of these volunteers also held citizenship in other countries, they identified primarily as Americans. Approximately 1,681 also served in the Mackenzie-Papineau ("Mac-Pap") Battalion once massive losses in both battalions led to mergers and transfers of men.

Many of the volunteers were either first or second-generation immigrants, and the battalion was at least one-third Jewish. The average age of Americans who served in Spain was 27. Still, there were volunteers as young as age 16. The volunteers came from 46 out of 48 states in the U.S. New York City provided the single largest number of recruits, with 1/5th to 1/3rd being of or formerly from the city before going to Spain. Of the volunteers who could speak Spanish, most were from either New York City or Ybor City located in Tampa, Florida.

Americans who applied were screened by the Communist Party USA with an in-person interview by a special committee. The committee tried to filter out "adventurers" and those who "lacked a political understanding of the anti-fascist struggle." In the Communist Party, joining the brigade was never mandatory. Secrecy was a high priority, and volunteers were given minimal information by Party leaders and only obtained information regarding their passports when they had passed their examination. The committee recommended that volunteers supply false information to customs and border officials about where they were travelling.

Americans usually entered Spain by first emigrating to France because the U.S. Government was not issuing visas to Spain as part of a non-intervention policy regarding the Spanish Civil War. Few American volunteers arrived after September 1937.

Battalion members fought for many different reasons. For the 85 African-American members of the battalion, the Nationalist forces represented some of the same injustices they faced back in the U.S. The Nationalist army primarily consisted of colonial troops from Spain's African colonies or of conscripted blacks who were desperate to escape poverty. Furthermore, Franco was supported by the Italian army and air force, which had only recently conquered the African nation of Ethiopia. Several leaders characterized the war as a crusade against the "Africanization" of Spain, although it was the Nationalists who relied on African fighters. Langston Hughes, a journalist for the Baltimore Afro-American at the time, wrote, "Give Franco a hood, and he would be a member of the Ku Klux Klan." The Lincoln Battalion was about one-third Jewish, included White and Black enlistees and was integrated.

Most of the original volunteers in the Lincoln Battalion were communists or Soviet sympathizers. It is difficult to list exactly how many members of the battalion were communists because political ideology was not a litmus test for serving in the war. Historians and veterans of the battalion estimate that between 50 and 80% of the battalion were actively communist. It is certain, though, that the vast majority of the commanding officers were communists and ethnically Jewish. Unlike most of their European counterparts, the Americans in the International Brigade were more likely to be students who had never seen military service before the Spanish Civil War.

Not all combatants were motivated by ideological or political concerns. As Moe Fishman, a veteran of the battalion, recalled in 2006, "Some men were running away from bad marital or love situations, but what united all of us was that we hated fascism." Anti-fascism, more than any other single factor, is what motivated and united the volunteers of the Lincoln Battalion.

== Other American units ==
Flag of one of the military units of the Lincoln Battalion

=== 20th Battalion, 86th Brigade ===
An American company served in the 20th International Battalion that was attached to the 86th Mixed Brigade. This unit fought on the Cordoba Front. Most of the American volunteers were transferred from the unit to the XVth Brigade before the Brunete Offensive.

=== George Washington Battalion ===
The Washington Battalion was the second American battalion. The unit was merged with the Lincoln Battalion during the Brunete Campaign. It was commanded by Mirko Marković, and its commissar was Dave Mates.

=== MacKenzie-Papineau Battalion ===
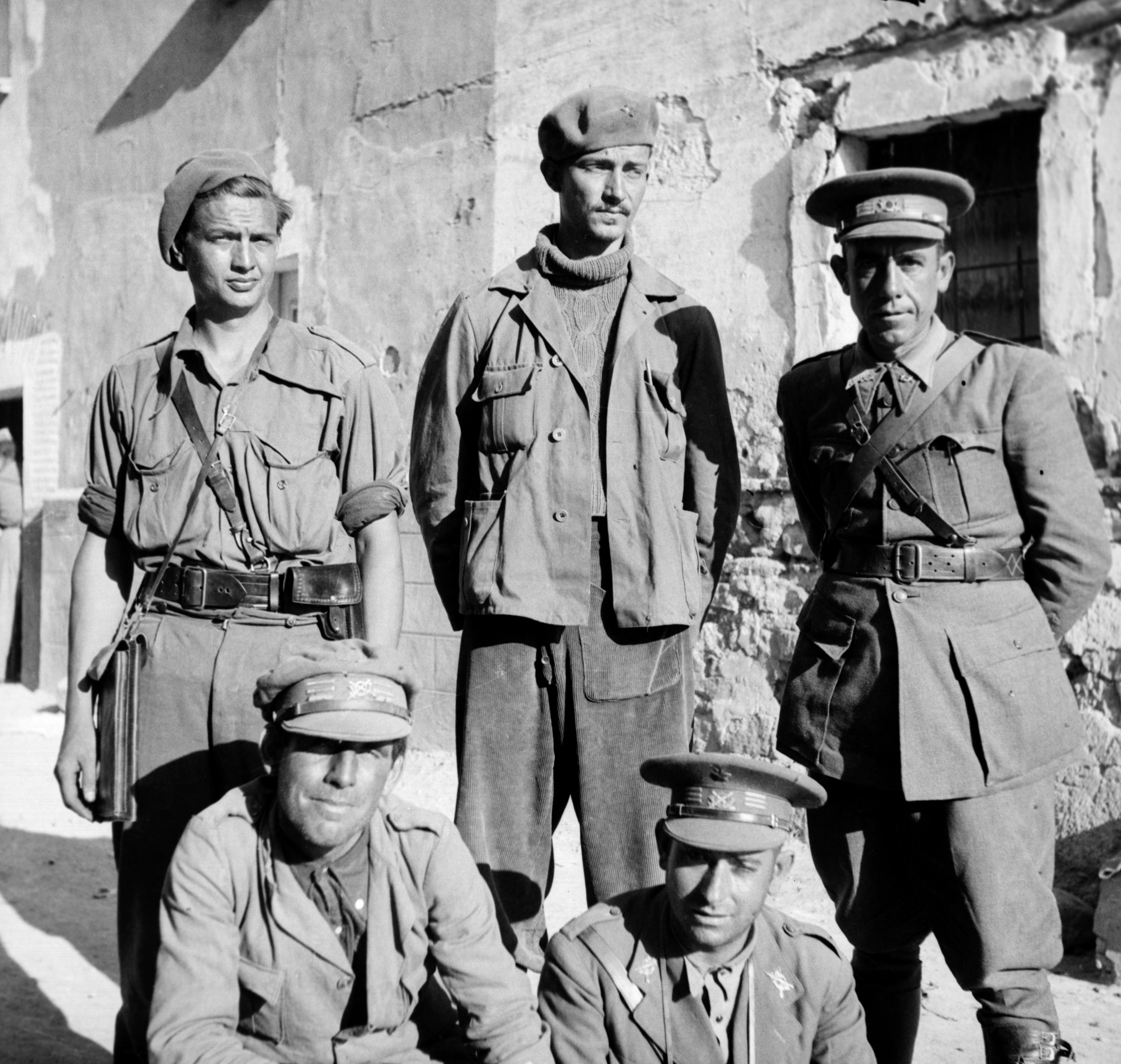
XV International Brigade Commanders, October 1937. Standing (L-R): Robert G. Thompson (Mackenzie–Papineau), Philip Detro (Lincoln-Washington), Garcia (24th). Seated: Paddy O'Daire (British), Aguila (24th).

The Mac Paps, as they were known, formed as the number of Canadians fighting in the Lincoln and Washington battalions grew. Established on July 1, 1937 (Canada Day) at first there were more American soldiers in the ranks than Canadians, but that 3-1 ratio soon shifted and the Mac Paps ended with a roll call of over 1,500 Canadians. Its first commander was Robert G. Thompson, an American veteran of the Lincoln Battalion. Joseph Dallet, also American, was the first Commissar.

=== 2nd Squadron, First Regiment de Tren ===
The Regiment de Tren was a transportation unit supporting the Republican forces. The Second Squadron was predominately American. The commander was Durward Clark.

=== John Brown Battery ===
This unit's official title was the 14th Battery, 2nd Group, 11th Regiment. It was a heavy artillery unit operating 155mm guns. The battery commander was Arthur Timpson, with Jack Waters as Commissar.

=== 4th Group, 35th Battery ===
Initially, this unit operated 155mm guns but was later equipped with 45mm anti-tank guns, which were included in the 129th International Brigade. The battery commander was Nathan Budish, and his Commissar was Sid Kaufman.

== American Medical Bureau ==
AMB armband.

Organized by Dr. Edward K. Barsky, the American Medical Bureau (AMB) recruited doctors, dentists, nurses, administrators, and ambulance drivers to support the Spanish Republic. In its fundraising events, the names 'American Medical Bureau to Save Spanish Democracy' and 'Medical Bureau & North American Committee to Aid Spanish Democracy' were also used.

In the United States, the AMB staged events to shift public opinion away from supporting the aid boycott to the Spanish Republic imposed by the American government following the agreements of the Non-intervention Committee. In Spain, the AMB was assigned to hospitals and medical centers of the Spanish Military Medical Services (Cuerpo de Sanidad), such as the Gómez Ulla Military Hospital in Madrid, and also to front-line locations. AMB members, who also included women, treated both international as well as Spanish combatants.

By the end of the war, a majority of both the Spanish aid committees and the leadership councils of the AMB were women. Many women leaders in the aid movement were wives of prominent American leftists or soldiers in the Lincoln Battalion. Katherine Duncan, wife to Governor La Follette's secretary, and Peggy Dennis, a communist party leader, were leaders in the active Madison, Wisconsin chapter. Marion Merriman, wife to Abraham Lincoln Battalion commander Robert Merriman (the supposed inspiration of Hemingway's hero in For Whom the Bell Tolls), was the chairwoman of the extensive San Francisco branch of the organization. She and Fredericka Martin were the only women to receive officer commissions from the Spanish Republic. Evelyn Hutchins, an active member of the AMB, agitated for years to be a hospital driver on the front-lines. Still, Spanish Republican policies prevented women from serving on the front-lines until 1938, when Hutchins won the right to serve as a driver.

== Aftermath ==
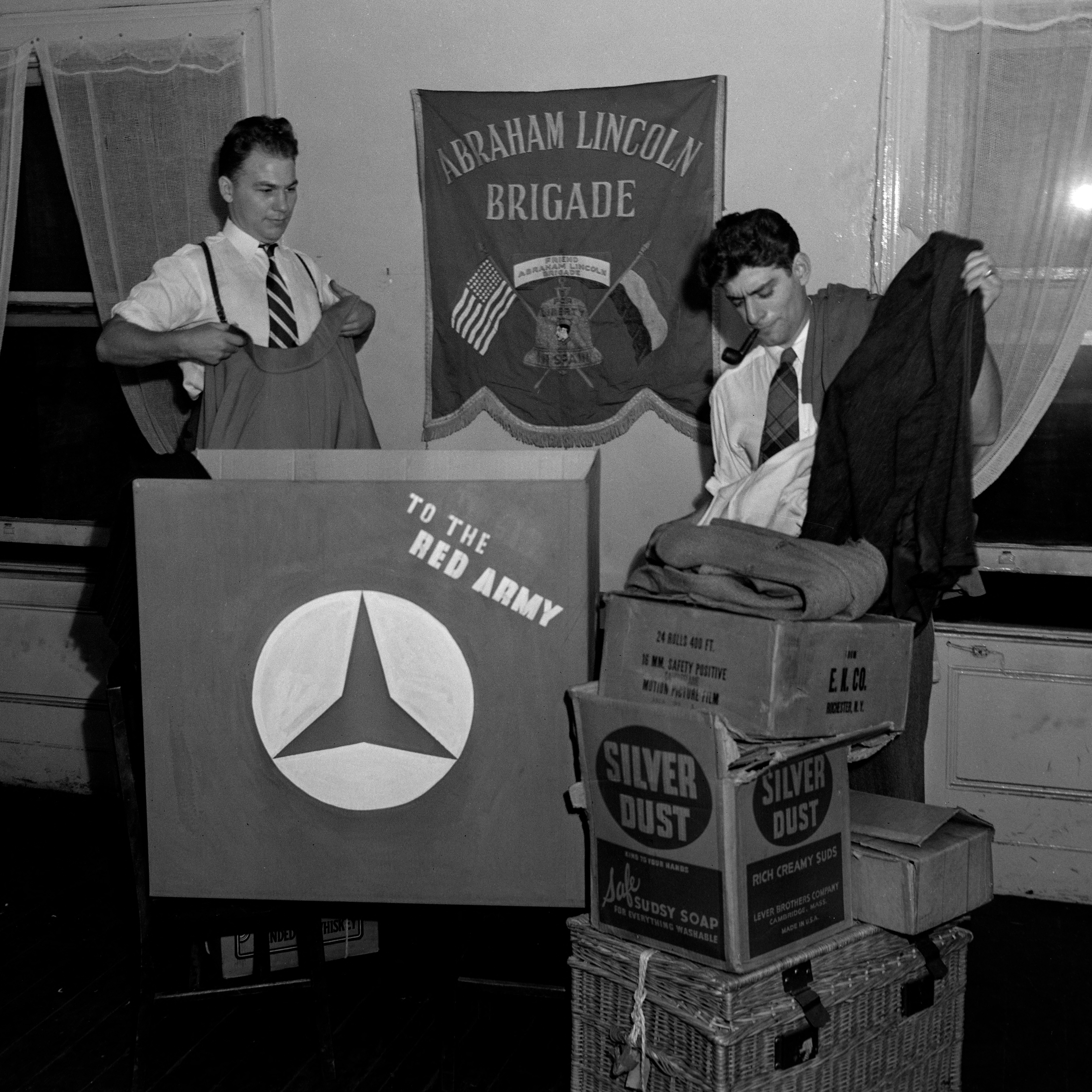
Brigade veterans Fred Keller (left) and Milton Wolff pack clothes to be sent to the Red Army, 1941

During and after the Spanish Civil War, members of the brigade were generally viewed as supporters of the Soviet Union. After returning to the United States, many joined the Veterans of the Abraham Lincoln Brigade (VALB). However, the Molotov–Ribbentrop Pact caused a division among the Lincoln Brigade veterans. Some of them, adopting the official Communist line, joined with the American Peace Mobilization in protesting American support for Britain and France against Nazi Germany. Others persisted with the anti-Fascist line which they had followed to Spain. After the German invasion of the Soviet Union, the VALB changed its stance and fully backed the war. Former Lincoln-Washington commander Milton Wolff volunteered in 1940 for the British Special Operations Executive and arranged the provision of arms for the European resistance organizations.

During the Second World War, the U.S. government considered former members of the brigade to be security risks. FBI Director J. Edgar Hoover requested that President Roosevelt ensure that former ALB members fighting in U.S. Forces in World War II not be considered for commissioning as officers or to have any positive distinction conferred upon them. In 1947, the veterans of the Abraham Lincoln Brigade were placed on the Attorney General's List of Subversive Organizations. The veterans would be one of only five groups that would stay intact to at least 1970 after receiving this designation.

Once the United States entered World War II, the Federal Bureau of Investigation recommended that all veterans of the Lincoln Battalion be denied military promotion to prevent communists from rising in the armed forces. After World War II ended, veterans of the Lincoln Battalion were denied military enlistment and government jobs. The House Un-American Activities Committee blacklisted the names of all veterans of the Lincoln Battalion. The Brigade was also included in the Attorney General's List of Subversive Organizations on April 29, 1953. Veterans were fired, spied upon, harassed, labeled communists to employers, denied housing, and refused passports for decades. The FBI has denied that it maintained any files on the veterans of the Lincoln Battalion, but veterans groups claim that the federal government is merely covering up its crimes.

In 1978, Congressman Ron Dellums proposed legislation that would have classified those who fought in the Lincoln Brigade as veterans of World War II.

In 1985, in an interview with Scripps-Howard editors, President Ronald Reagan said that most Americans believed that their fellow Americans who fought with the Loyalist forces were on the wrong side.

The last known surviving member of the Lincoln Battalion, Delmer Berg, died on February 28, 2016, at the age of 100.

== Anthem: "Valley of Jarama" ==
Members of the XV International Brigade adapted a song by Alex McDade to reflect the losses at the Battle of Jarama. Sung to the tune of the traditional country song Red River Valley, it became their anthem.

== Members ==
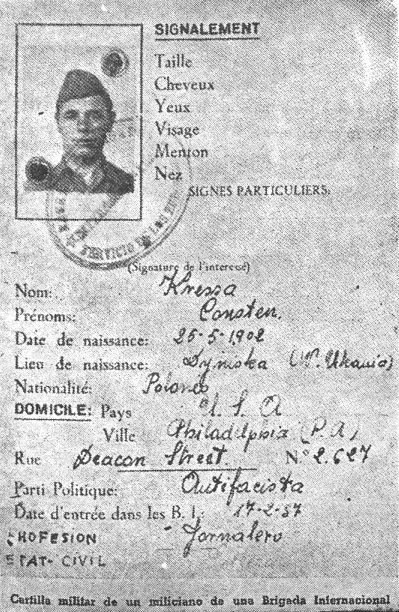
International Brigade ID card of Consten Kressa, who joined the Lincoln Battalion on 17 February 1937. He was killed on 1 April 1938

=== Lincoln Battalion commanding officers ===
- James Harris
- Robert Hale Merriman
- Martin Hourihan
- Oliver Law
- Mirko Markovics
- Steve Nelson
- Hans Amlie
- Leonard Lamb
- Philip Detro
- David Morris Reiss
- Aaron Lopoff
- Milton Wolff

=== Lincoln Battalion commissars ===
- Phil Bard
- George Brodsky
- Archie Brown
- Dave Doran
- Carl Geiser
- David E. Jones
- Fred Keller
- Fred Lutz
- Steve Nelson
- John Gates
- Harry Haywood (Regimental Commissar)
- John Q. Robinson
- Sam Stember
- George Watt

=== Other notable members ===
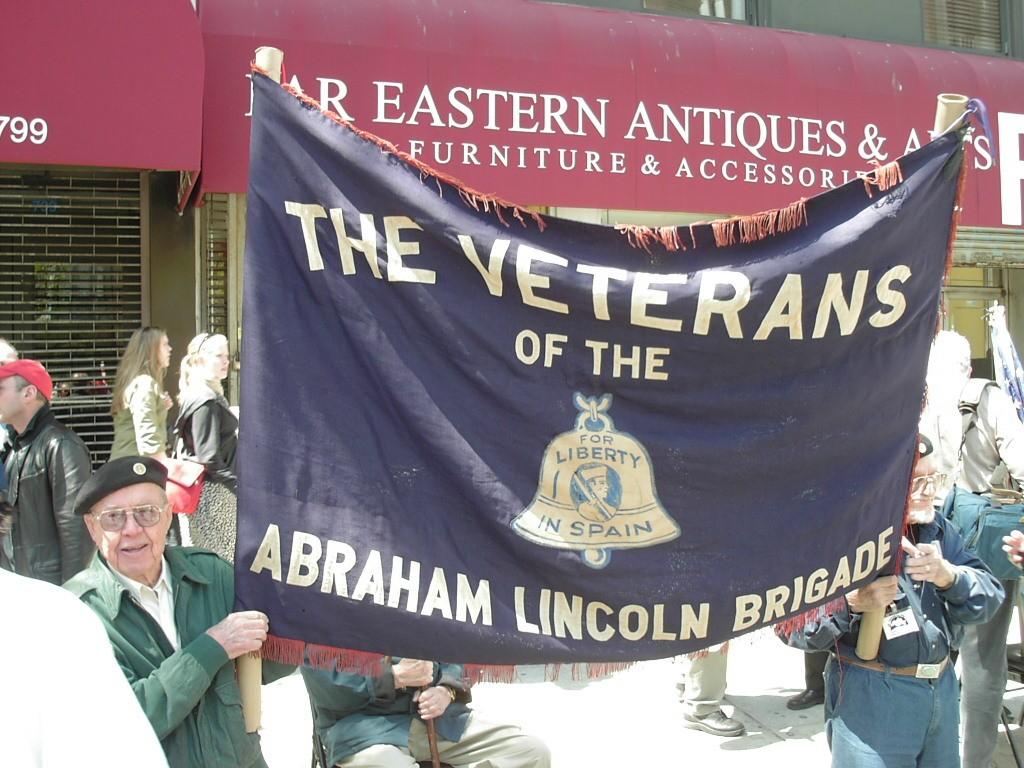
American veterans.

- Eddie Balchowsky – Artist, poet, & pianist, and inspiration for Jimmy Buffett song "He Went to Paris".
- James Walker Benét – Author and journalist (San Francisco Chronicle).
- Delmer Berg – Union organizer.
- Alvah Bessie – Hollywood screenwriter who was one of the Hollywood Ten.
- Herman Bottcher – Earned two Distinguished Service Crosses in World War II.
- Edward A. Carter, Jr. – Earned the Medal of Honor in World War II.
- Carmelo Delgado Delgado – Puerto Rican nationalist, among the first U.S. citizens to die in the war.
- Leo Eloesser – US thoracic surgeon.
- Moe Fishman – Co-founder and executive secretary/treasurer of the Veterans of the Abraham Lincoln Brigade.
- Walter Benjamin Garland – U.S. Army veteran and radio producer, commanded a machine gun battalion.
- John Gates – Political commissar of the battalion, later editor of The Daily Worker.
- William Lindsay Gresham – Novelist and non-fiction author particularly well-regarded among noir readers.
- William Herrick – Novelist.
- Robert Klonsky – One of the defendants in the Smith Act trial of the mid-1950s.
- Rolando Masferrer – Cuban politician and guerrilla leader.
- Conlon Nancarrow – Composer.
- Harry Wayland Randall – Chief photographer of the Photographic Unit of the 15th International Brigade.
- Edwin Rolfe – Poet and author of first history of Americans in Spain, The Lincoln Battalion (1939).
- George Sossenko – Also fought in the Durruti Column.
- Robert G. Thompson – Awarded the Distinguished Service Cross in World War II; among the 1950s Smith Act trial defendants.
- Albert Prago – Captain. Professor of History, City University of New York, Columbia University.

== Recognition ==
=== Memorials and awards ===
- Currently, four memorials are dedicated to the Abraham Lincoln Brigade veterans.
  - The first is located on the University of Washington campus in Seattle.
  - The second is in James Madison Park in Madison, Wisconsin.
  - A third memorial to the veterans of the Abraham Lincoln Brigade was dedicated on the Embarcadero in San Francisco, California on March 30, 2008. Among the speakers were San Francisco mayor Gavin Newsom and a few of the several ALB veterans still living. Peter Carroll, then acting Chair of the Abraham Lincoln Brigade Archives, described it as an "antidote to amnesia".
  - The fourth memorial commemorates the students and faculty of The City College of New York (CCNY) who fought in the Spanish Civil War, including the thirteen alums who died in that war. The memorial is located in the North Academic Center of CCNY.

=== In museums ===
In 2007, the exhibit Facing Fascism: New York and the Spanish Civil War at the Museum of the City of New York examined the role that New Yorkers played in the conflict, as well as the political and social ideologies that motivated them to participate in activities ranging from rallying support, fundraising, and relief aid, to fighting—and sometimes dying—on the front lines in Spain.

== See also ==
- International Brigades order of battle
- Irish Socialist Volunteers in the Spanish Civil War
- Jewish volunteers in the Spanish Civil War
- Polish volunteers in the Spanish Civil War
- Songs of the Lincoln Battalion
- Spanish Republican Air Force
- Spanish Republican Army
- Yankee Squadron

== Suggested listening ==
- Songs of the Spanish Civil War Vol. 2: Songs of the Lincoln Brigade (Folkways) (1962)
- Songs of the Lincoln and International Brigades (Stinson) (1962)
