= Mosess Fishman =

American soldier (1915–2007)

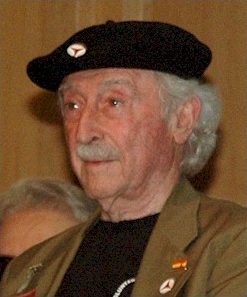
- Fishman at 70th anniversary reunion of the Veterans of the Abraham Lincoln Brigade in New York City, 2006
- Born: September 28, 1915; New York City, U.S.
- Died: August 6, 2007 (aged 91); New York City, U.S.
- Military career
- Allegiance: Spanish Republic; United States
- Branch: International Brigades; United States Merchant Marine
- Service years: 1937 c. 1941–1945
- Nickname: Moe
- Unit: The "Abraham Lincoln" XV International Brigade
- Conflicts: Spanish Civil War; Battle of Brunete (WIA); World War II

Executive Secretary-Treasurer of the Veterans of the Abraham Lincoln Brigade
- In office c. November 1950 – August 6, 2007
- National Commander: Milton Wolff Steve Nelson
- Preceded by: Jack P. Bjoze

Mosess "Moe" Fishman (September 28, 1915, in New York City – August 6, 2007) fought with the communist Abraham Lincoln Brigade and was wounded during the Spanish Civil War. He was general secretary of the Abraham Lincoln Brigade Veterans' Association.

== Early life ==
He was born on September 28, 1915, in Astoria, New York. He graduated from Stuyvesant High School at the age of 16 and entered college for one semester. He had to leave college for lack of funds and went to work in his father's commercial laundry.

He joined the Young Communist League. He helped organize a large laundry business whose employees thereupon got a weekly pay increase from $12 to $14 in their first contract.

== Spanish Civil War ==
Fishman volunteered in New York City but was rejected for lack of military experience. He then applied again as a truck driver and was accepted provided that he recruit ten other volunteers. He did but none of them actually showed up, but he was accepted anyway.

Fishman arrived in Spain in April 1937 and began serving as a soldier in the George Washington Battalion. On July 5, 1937, during the Battle of Brunete near the village of Villanueva de la Cañada a sniper shot Fishman in the thigh, leaving 32 pieces of bone and metal. He spent a year in Spain recovering from his wound and was then evacuated back to New York, where he spent another two years in hospitals. He had a lifelong limp from his injury.

While he recuperated back in New York he worked with humanitarian organizations giving aid to civilian refugees of the war. He got a job in the warehouse of the Joint Anti-Fascist Refugee Committee. At the same time he studied to become a licensed radio operator. This qualified him to join the Merchant Marine when the United States entered World War II.

== After World War II ==
The House Committee on Un-American Activities investigated him for alleged subversive activities. He also remained active in the Veterans of the Abraham Lincoln Brigade (VALB).

According to Peter Carroll's biographical sketch of Fishman,

... it was Fishman's proximity to that case that changed his life when HUAC set its sights on the VALB and President Harry Truman's Attorney General listed the group as a subversive organization in 1947 as part of the postwar anti-Communist crusade. When Congress passed the McCarran Act in 1950, obliging all designated subversive organizations to register with the federal government and creating heavy penalties for leaders who refused to cooperate, the entire executive committee of the VALB resigned in 1950. In its place, two Lincoln veterans stepped forward: Milton Wolff became the National Commander; Moe Fishman became the Executive Secretary/Treasurer and served the organization in an executive capacity for the rest of his life.

Fishman and Wolff led the defense campaign of the Veterans of the Abraham Lincoln Brigade (VALB) before the Subversive Activities Control Board (SACB) in 1954. When defeated, they pursued an appeal that was eventually successful in the 1970s in having the Attorney General's list and the SACB's rulings declared unconstitutional. After their victory Fishman expressed the opinion that it might be time to

do something subversive and get back on it otherwise the public we are trying to reach, especially the youth constituency, will look askance at these 'revisionists' who have stopped being subversive and have a U.S. Court of Appeals that agrees we are not.

Fishman and Wolff took up the cause of a Spaniard who had worked with them in the 1940s and was then in a Franco prison. This became a campaign to support all political prisoners in Franco's Spain, one that continued until the dictator died in 1975.

In 1957 Fishman and Wolff organized the first reunion of the VALB since the 1940s. Though the organization VALB is no more these reunions still continue under the auspices of the Abraham Lincoln Brigade Archives.

More and more veterans returned to the VALB beginning in the 1970s, freed by retirement from fear of firings and by legal victory from fear of overt harassment by the U.S. government. Fishman's organizing activities took him all over the United States, to a great many meetings and speaking engagements, especially in High Schools and colleges.

== Later life ==
Fishman remained active in a number of progressive organizations, including Veterans For Peace New York City Chapter 34, the Joint Anti-Fascist Refugee Committee (JAFRC), and United for Peace and Justice.

During the 1980s Fishman, together with many other Veterans of the Abraham Lincoln Brigade, protested U.S. aid to the Nicaraguan Contras. The VALB raised money for ambulances to be sent to the Nicaraguan government to aid those wounded by the American-funded Contras. He also participated in protesting the U.S. Navy's use of Vieques, an island off Puerto Rico as a bombing range until 2003.

In August 2004 Fishman helped carry a Veterans of the Abraham Lincoln Brigade banner in a protest at Madison Square Garden against the 2004 Republican National Convention. In 2003 and 2006, together with other VALB members and supporters he marched in demonstrations opposing the U.S. invasion of Iraq and Afghanistan.

He lived in the Penn South co-op in the Chelsea section of Manhattan.

Mosess Fishman died in Manhattan aged 92 on August 6, 2007, from pancreatic cancer.
