= Milton Wolff =

American writer and veteran (1915–2008

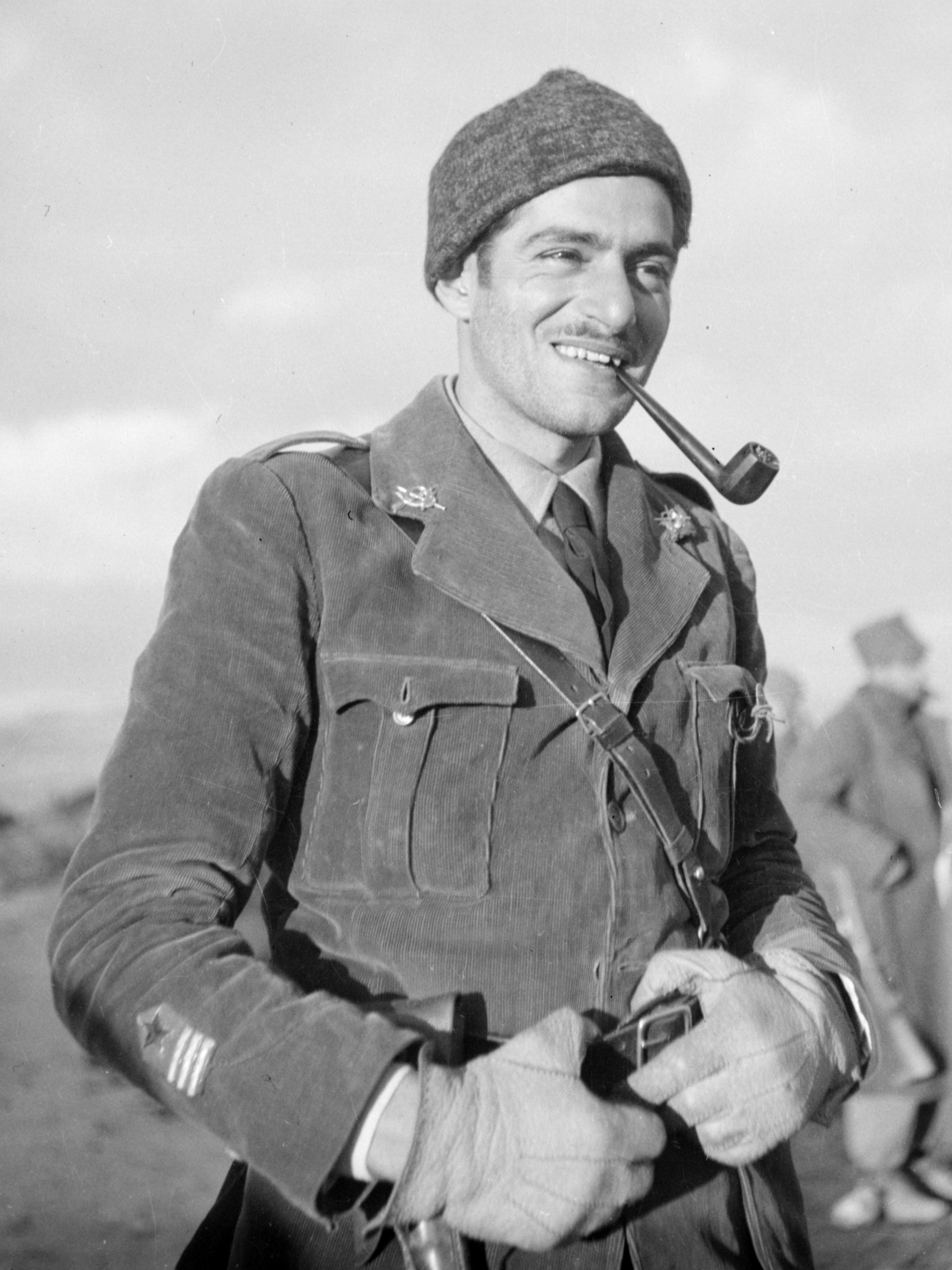
- Wolff in 1937
- Born: October 7, 1915; New York City, U.S.
- Died: January 14, 2008 (aged 92); Berkeley, California, U.S.
- Military career
- Allegiance: Spanish Republic; United Kingdom; United States
- Branch: International Brigades; Special Operations Executive; United States Army; Office of Strategic Services
- Service years: 1937–1938; 1940–1945
- Rank: Battalion Commander; Lieutenant
- Unit: The "Abraham Lincoln" XV International Brigade
- Commands: Lincoln Battalion
- Conflicts: Spanish Civil War; Battle of Brunete; Battle of Belchite; Battle of Quinto; Battle of Fuentes de Ebro; Battle of Teruel; Battle of Segura de los Baños; Battle of the Ebro; World War II; Burma campaign; Italian campaign

National Commander of the Veterans of the Abraham Lincoln Brigade
- In office December 24, 1939 – 1963
- Executive Secretary-Treasurer: Gerald Cook Irving Goff (Acting) David McKelvy White Jack P. Bjoze Mosess Fishman
- Preceded by: Paul Burns
- Succeeded by: Steve Nelson

Milton Wolff (October 7, 1915 – January 14, 2008) was an American writer and activist who served as the last commander of the Lincoln Battalion during the Spanish Civil War and as an Allied intelligence operative during World War II.

== Early life ==
Wolff was born into a working class Jewish immigrant family in the Bensonhurst neighborhood of Brooklyn, New York on October 7, 1915. His parents originally came from Lithuania and Hungary. He attended the New York School of Commercial Art but dropped out to join the Civilian Conservation Corps during the Great Depression. He joined the Young Communist League on returning to Brooklyn from the CCC. It was there that he volunteered to go to Spain to fight fascism.

== Spanish Civil War ==
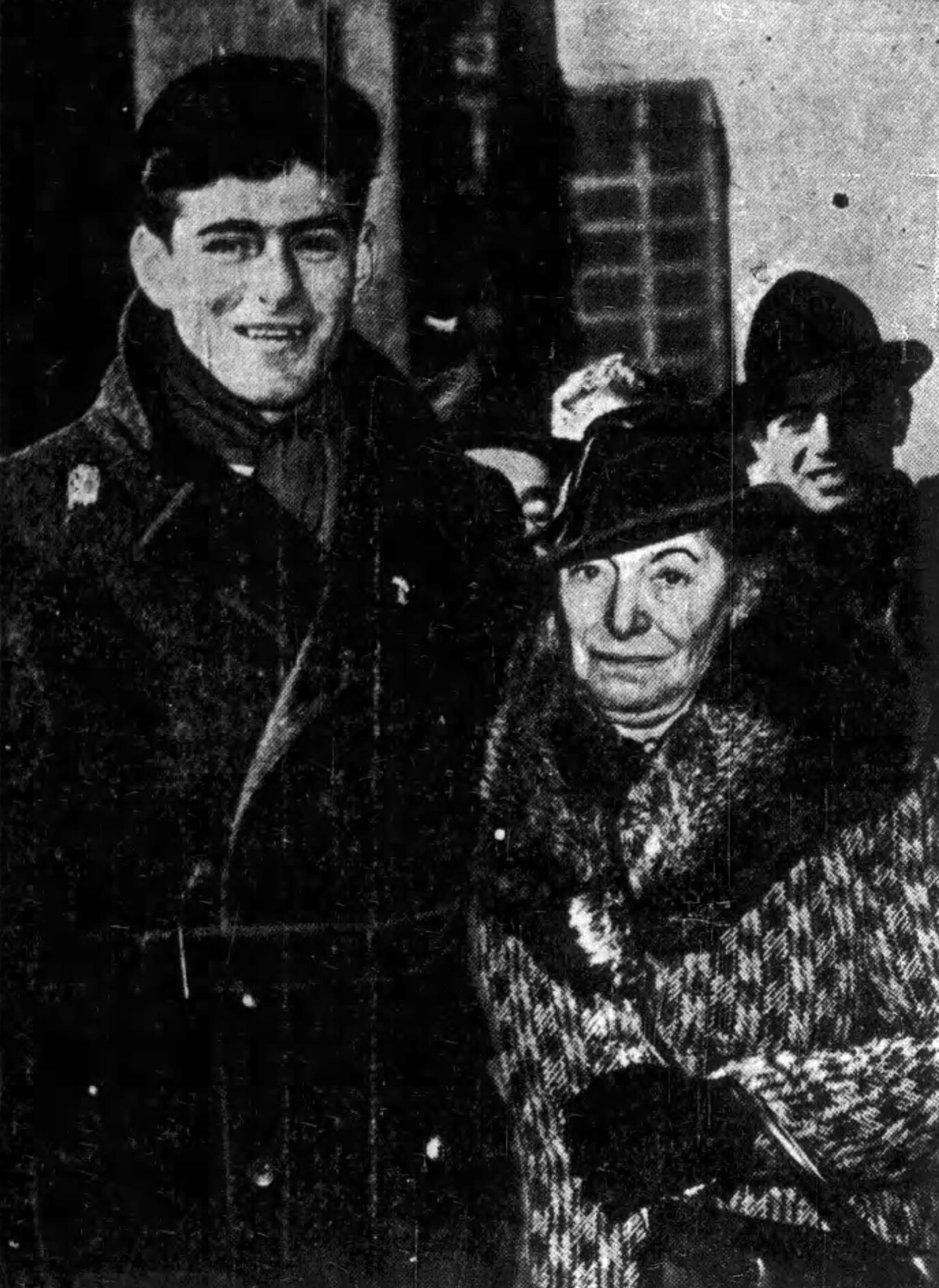
Wolff is greeted by his mother after returning home from Spain, December 15, 1938

In early 1937, Wolff set off to join the International Brigades in Spain, reaching Albacete by March. As a pacifist, a belief common in the 1930s, he originally wished to be a medic. However, after the International Brigades' heavy losses at the Battle of Jarama, he became a soldier instead, joining a machine gun company. "Largely self-educated, ... [he] was an intellectual". He "detested elegant uniforms", customarily wearing "baggy trousers, a stained leather jacket" and, in wet weather, a "woolly poncho".

After a year's fighting in Brunete, Belchite and Teruel, the Brigade lost two senior officers, David Doran and Robert Hale Merriman at the Gandesa battle on the Aragon front. After which, in March 1938, Wolff became the battalion commander. He led the now Lincoln-Washington Battalion during the Battle of the Ebro and left Spain in November 1938 when the International Brigades were demobilized. Ernest Hemingway described him during this period: [he was] "...23 years old, tall as Lincoln, gaunt as Lincoln, and as brave and as good a soldier as any that commanded battalions at Gettysburg. He is alive and unhit by the same hazard that leaves one tall palm tree standing where a hurricane has passed."

== World War II ==
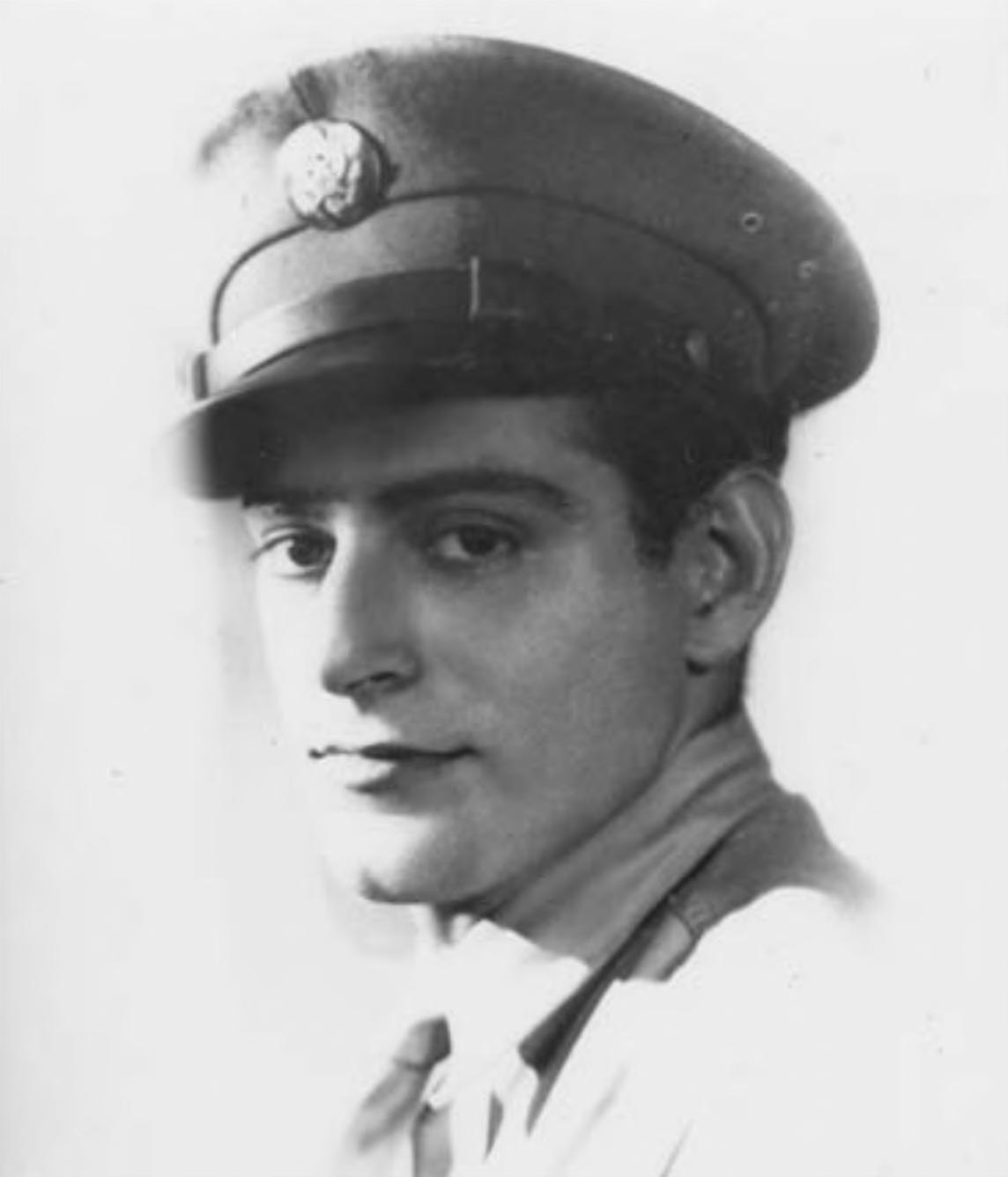
Wolff in his U.S. Army uniform, 1942

In 1940, Wolff volunteered for the British Special Operations Executive, and arranged arms for the European resistance organizations. After the United States' entry into World War II, Wolff volunteered for the U.S. Army infantry in June 1942.

He saw action at the end of 1943 in Burma, where he earned a field commission as a lieutenant. There, General "Wild Bill" Donovan met him and assigned him to the OSS to work with anti-fascist partisans in occupied Italy.

In 1945, Wolff was one of 16 Army officers and enlisted men singled out as alleged Communists by the House Committee on Military Affairs. General Donovan came to their defense, citing their loyalty and effectiveness.

== Later life ==
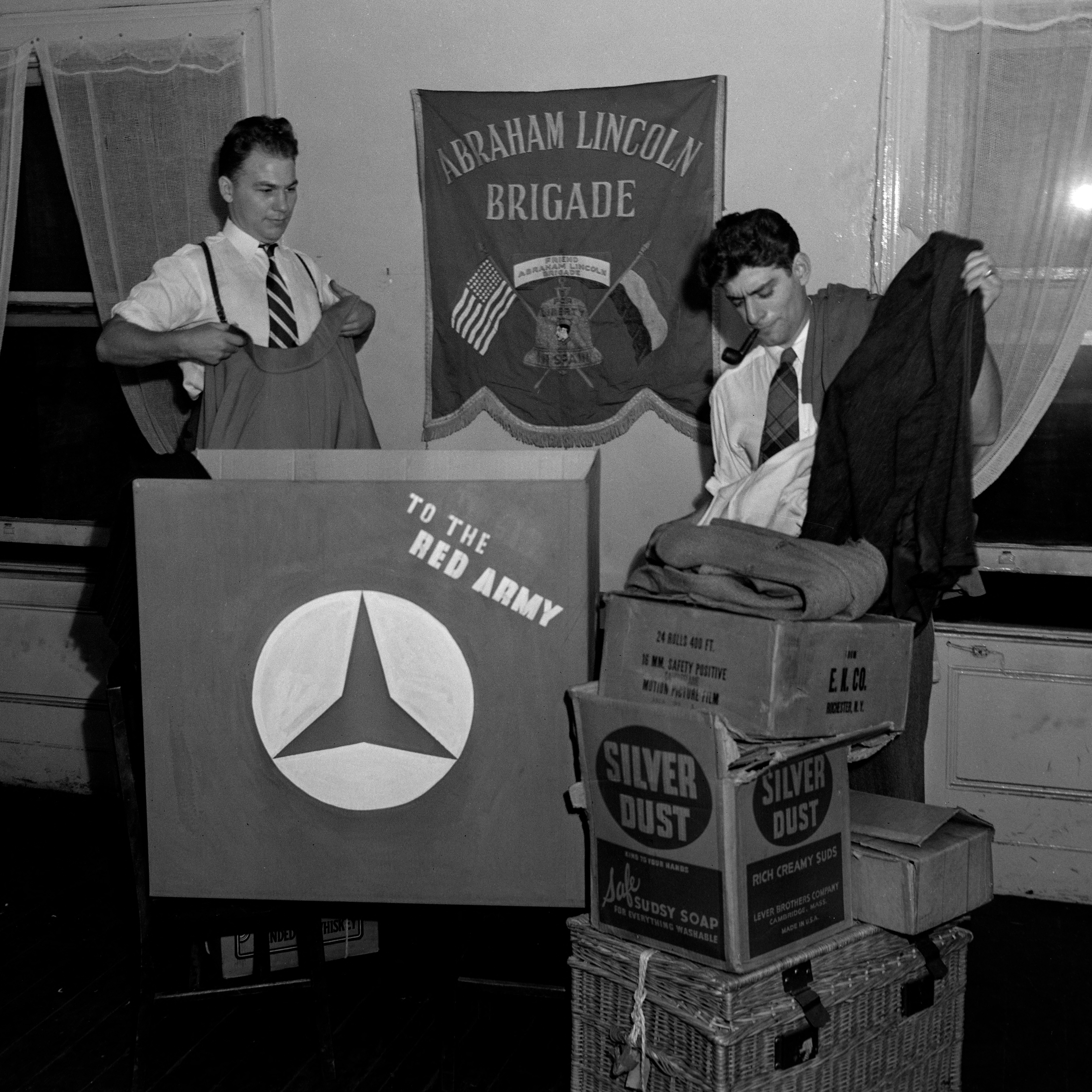
Wolff (right) and fellow Lincoln Brigade veteran Fred Keller pack clothes to be sent to the Red Army, 1941

Wolff appeared before the House Un-American Activities Committee to defend VALB (Veterans of the Abraham Lincoln Brigade) from being banned as a Communist front organization. His explanation for his actions owed to his ancestry: "I am Jewish, and knowing that as a Jew we are the first to suffer when fascism does come, I went to Spain to fight against it."

According to historian Peter Carroll:

When Congress passed the McCarran Act in 1950, obliging all designated subversive organizations to register with the federal government and creating heavy penalties for leaders who refused to cooperate, the entire executive committee of the VALB resigned in 1950. In its place, two Lincoln veterans stepped forward: Wolff became the National Commander; Moe Fishman became the Executive Secretary/Treasurer...

However, newspaper accounts indicate Wolff was first elected National Commander in 1939. He was succeeded by fellow Lincoln Battalion commander Steve Nelson in 1963.

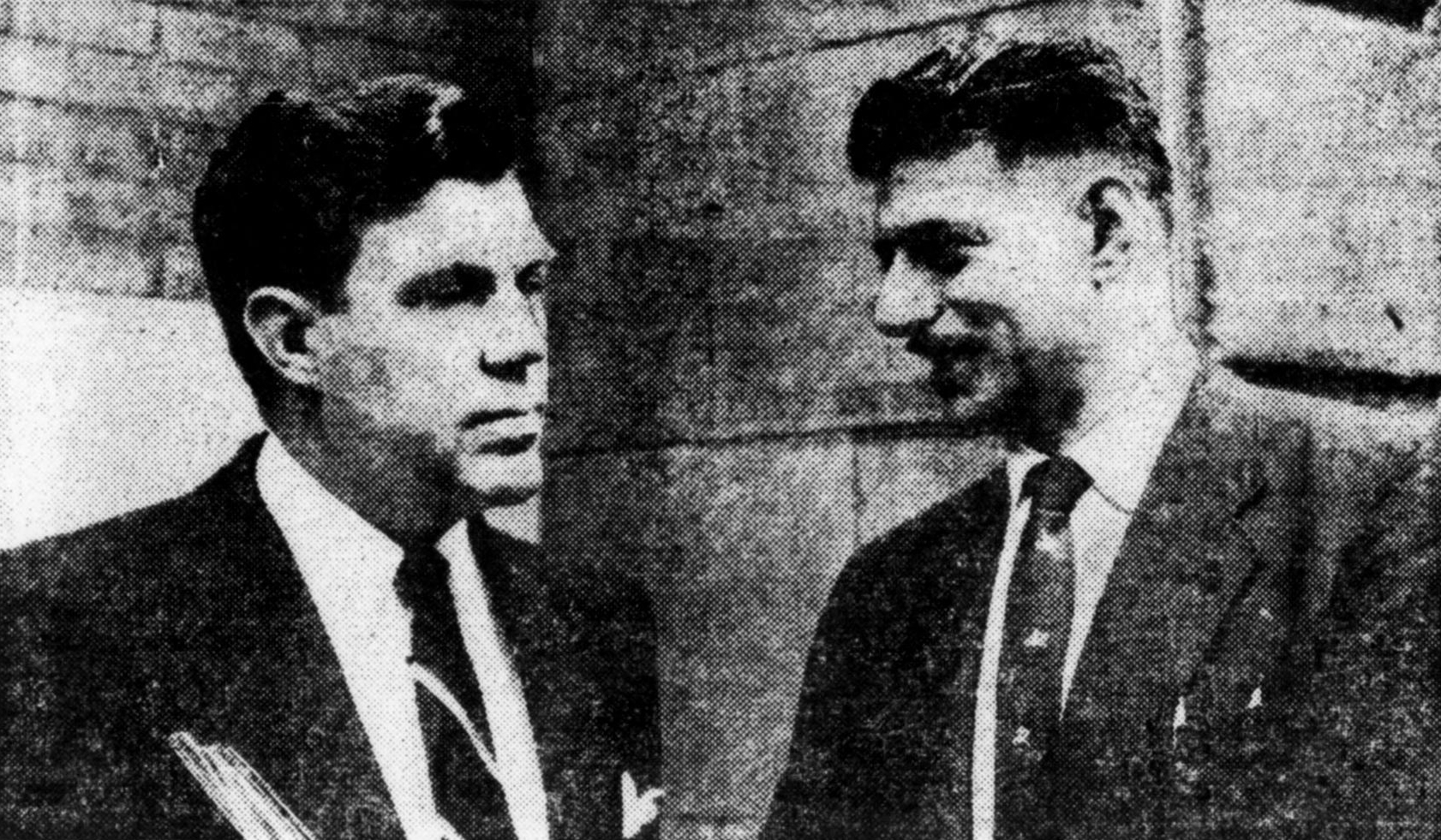
Wolff (right) with VALB attorney Homer C. Clay c. 1954

Wolff also battled fiercely for civil rights and against the Vietnam War. He even offered the services of the aging veterans of the Lincoln Brigade to the North Vietnamese leader, Ho Chi Minh, who declined them. Later, Wolff campaigned against apartheid in South Africa, and raised money for ambulances in Sandinista-ruled Nicaragua in the 1980s, personally delivering twenty of them. Wolff completed two autobiographical novels, A Member Of The Working Class (published 2005) about his early life in New York, and Another Hill (published 1994) about his communist and Spanish experiences; he began a third book, The Premature Anti-Fascist, describing his experiences after leaving Spain and during World War II, but did not finish it before his death.

This extraordinary novel centers on one battalion, the Americans, known as the Lincolns, barely trained men who went into battle armed with 1903 Remington rifles. I have never read more intimate, convincing, and devastating accounts of combat.

— Martha Gellhorn on Another Hill

== Personal life ==
Wolff married and had two children. His family resided primarily in Stony Creek, Connecticut. His first marriage ended in divorce. Wolff and his second wife are both buried at the Sunset View Cemetery in El Cerrito.

== Works and features ==
- Franco Spain: Menace to World Peace (Veterans of the Abraham Lincoln Brigade, 1947).
- Another Hill: An Autobiographical Novel (1994; University of Illinois Press, 2001). ISBN 978-0-252-06983-3
- A Member of the Working Class (iUniverse, 2005). ISBN 978-0-595-37267-6
- Wolff was featured in the film documentary The Good Fight: The Abraham Lincoln Brigade in the Spanish Civil War (1984).
