= Walter Benjamin Garland =

American soldier (1913–1974)

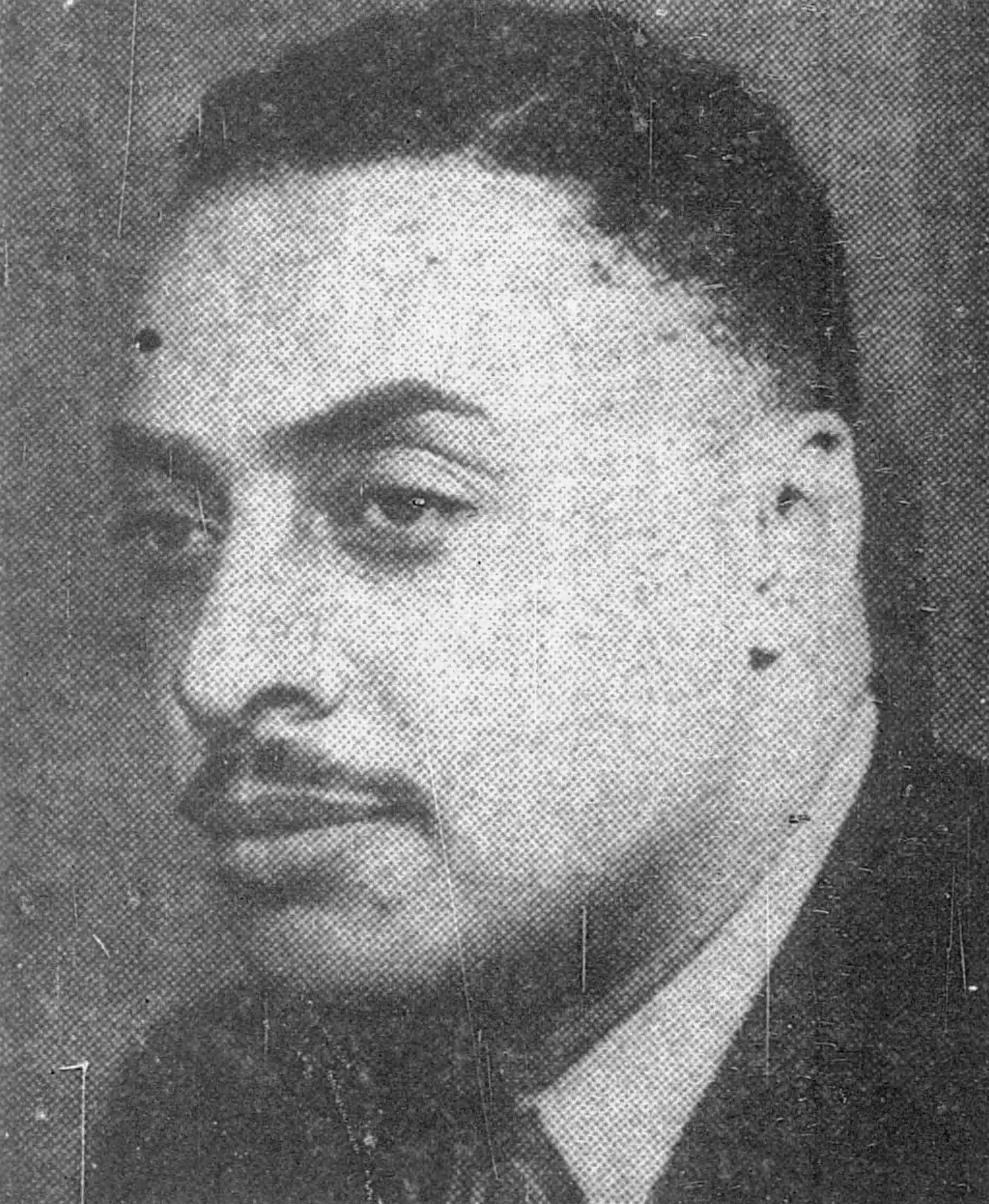
- Garland c. 1940
- Born: Walter Benjamin Stephen Garland; November 27, 1913; New York City, U.S.
- Died: January 7, 1974 (aged 60); Columbus, Ohio, U.S.
- Education: Brooklyn College
- Military career
- Allegiance: United States; Spanish Republic; United States
- Branch: United States Army; International Brigades; United States Army
- Service years: 1931–1935; 1937; 1942–1945
- Rank: Private First Class; Lieutenant; First Sergeant
- Units: The "Abraham Lincoln" XV International Brigade; 731st Military Police Battalion
- Conflicts: Spanish Civil War; Battle of Jarama (WIA); Battle of Brunete (WIA); World War II

Walter Benjamin Garland (November 27, 1913 – January 7, 1974) was an American soldier, activist, and politician. Garland was a volunteer in the Washington Battalion of the XV International Brigade fighting for Republican Spain during the Spanish Civil War. Following the conclusion of the war, Garland joined the Communist Party USA and ran for office in New York. He later worked alongside Paul Robeson as a bodyguard. Garland died in Columbus, Ohio in 1974.

== Early life ==
Garland was born in Brooklyn, New York on November 27, 1913. He joined the United States Army in 1931 at the age of eighteen. He served in the army for two years before being discharged in 1935, achieving the rank of Private First-Class. Following his army service he enrolled at Brooklyn College, where he studied mathematics. He was employed by NBC as an arranger and was attached to the media department producing Your Hit Parade (sponsored by Lucky Strike Cigarettes.) In 1935 he became a member of the Communist Party USA and was active in the National Negro Congress.

== Military service ==
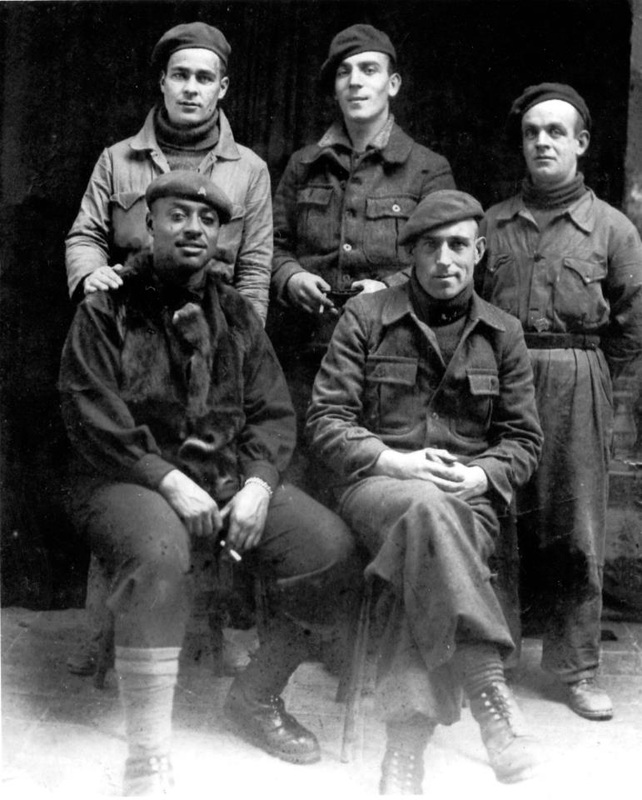
Garland (seated, left) with a group of Irish volunteers in the International Brigades. Standing behind him is Peter O'Connor.

The outbreak of the Spanish Civil War in 1936 resulted in many international communist parties sending manpower and financial support to Republican Spain. Garland, being a staunch anti-fascist and member of the American communist movement, volunteered for service in Spain. He sailed for France aboard the SS Champlain on January 5, 1937 and from there made his way to Republican lines. Once in Spain he joined what would become the Abraham Lincoln Battalion, in which he was appointed section commander on account of his previous military experience.

Garland was wounded in battle on February 27 during the advance of the 17th International Column on Jarama. During his convalescence, Garland was selected to attend officer training school, and he returned to the front as the commander of a machine gun battalion (dubbed the Washington Battalion.) Garland was wounded for a second time in July 1937, during the Republican defeat at the Battle of Brunete. Following his second wounding, Garland was promoted to captain and given command of the Canadian Mackenzie–Papineau Battalion while the formation was in training. In August he collaborated with Langston Hughes and Harry Haywood to broadcast a radio message to the United States live from Spain with the intent to drum up support for the Republican cause.

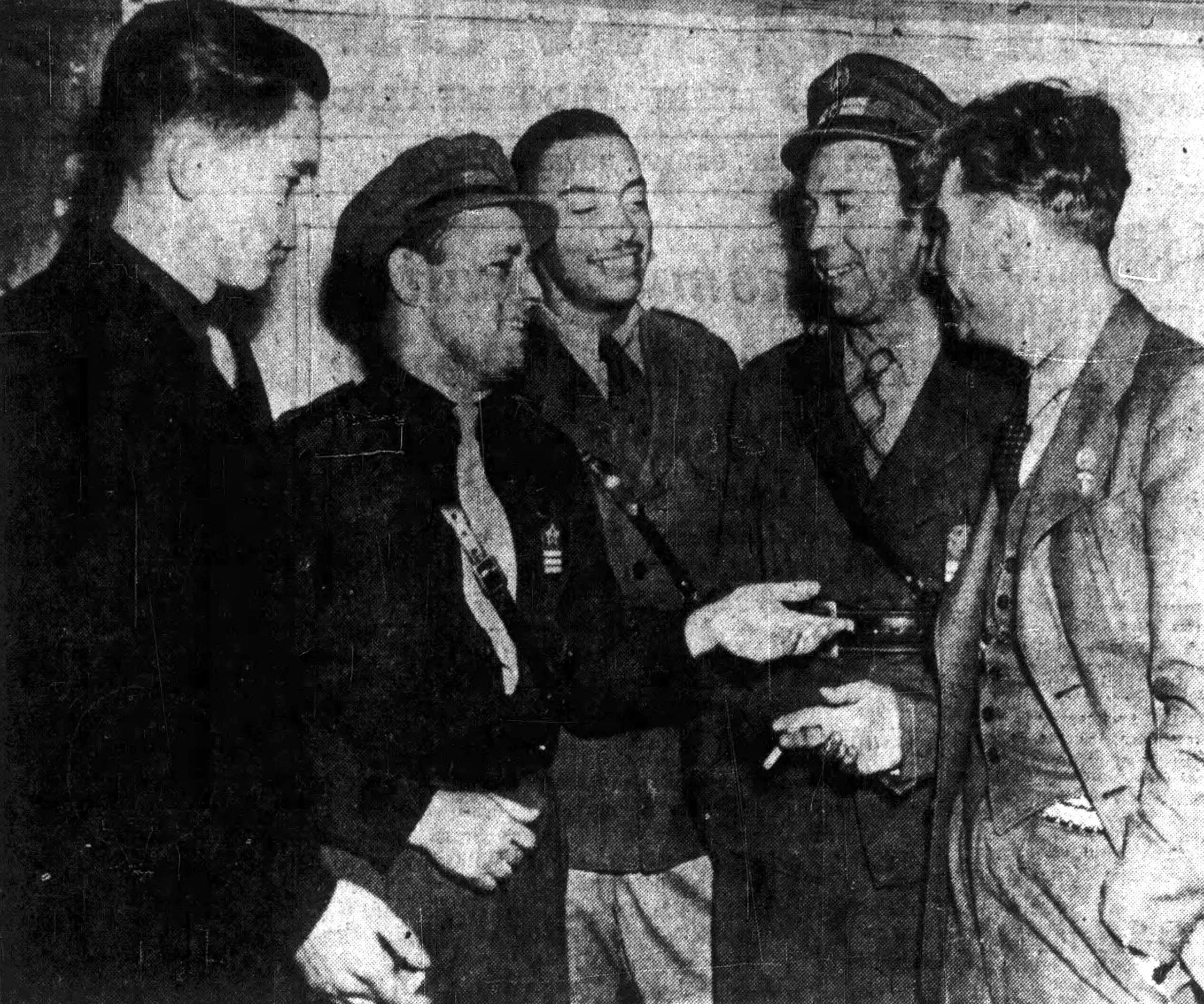
Garland (center) and other Lincoln Brigade veterans return home from Spain, November 1937. (L-R): Bill Wheeler, Carl Bradley, Walter Garland, Steve Nelson, Bill Lawrence.

Garland was ordered to return to the United States in October to raise funding and manpower for the International Brigades. Once he had returned to the United States, Garland began to lobby Congress to lift the armaments ban on Republican Spain. In 1938 he ran as the Communist Party's candidate for New York's 17th State Assembly district, an office he would run for again in 1940. Garland continued to be active with the Friends of the Abraham Lincoln Brigade and the American Medical Bureau after the defeat of the Republican cause in 1939.

In the lead up to the Second World War, Garland was monitored by the Federal Bureau of Investigation, which concluded that Garland was an individual who should be considered dangerous and "who in all probability should be interned in event of war" on account of his communist activities and service in Spain. Following the entry of the United States into World War II, Garland attempted to reenlist in the US Army but was initially denied. He tried again and was accepted into the 731st Military Police Battalion stationed at Fort Wadsworth on Staten Island. Garland was appointed as an instructor, and taught classes on mortar, machine-gun, and armed scout-car tactics. He also taught map-making and gave lectures on his role in the Brunete campaign. He developed a new gun sight for machine-guns mounted on armed scout cars. Garland was promoted to the rank of first sergeant, but was not deployed overseas despite repeated requests.

== Later life and death ==
Garland (right) speaks with Oliver Martin, New York State Commander of UNAVA, November 25, 1946

Following the end of the war, Garland and several other African-American veterans of the Spanish Civil War formed the United Negro Allied Veterans Association (UNAVA). The UNAVA had more than 10,000 members at its peak. In 1946, the Veterans Administration refused accreditation to the newly-formed group. In September of that year, the UNAVA sent hundreds of protesters to Washington, D.C., where they demanded federal anti-lynching legislation, the end of the poll tax, and the removal of white supremacist Mississippi senator Theodore G. Bilbo. The UNAVA was also active in Chicago, where they protested the Airport Homes race riots and worked with congressman William L. Dawson on fair housing legislation. In 1947, The New York Times reported on a national convention of the UNAVA, at which 200 delegates voted to send a delegation to the nation's capital to demand an investigation into discriminatory practices of the VA in the South. That year the group was placed on a federal list of "subversive organizations," making its work harder, and by 1949 it had shut down.

Garland continued to support communist causes in New York, and frequented the pro-communist Ben Davis Club in Harlem. He also organized efforts for the International Workers Order. In 1949 he traveled with Paul Robeson and acted as his bodyguard. Garland split with the CPUSA in 1952 (the party was hemorrhaging members at this time, falling from 80,000 in 1946 to 5,000 by 1954) and was expelled from the party that same year. The FBI continued to monitor Garland until his death in Columbus, Ohio on January 7, 1974.
