= Swedish intervention in the Winter War =

Swedish Intervention in the Winter War
- Part of Winter War and World War II
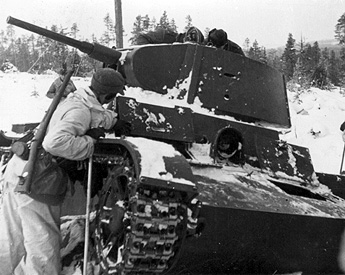
- Swedish soldiers inspecting a disabled enemy tank
Date	12 January – 13 March 1940 (2 months and 1 day)
Location	Eastern Finland
Result	End of the Winter War with the Moscow Peace Treaty
Territorial changes	Cession of the Gulf of Finland islands, Karelian Isthmus, Ladoga Karelia, Salla, and Rybachy Peninsula, and rental of Hanko to the Soviet Union

Belligerents
Sweden; Finland; Denmark; Norway Minor support from: France; Hungary; Italy; United Kingdom	Soviet Union; Terijoki Government

Commanders and leaders
(Sweden) Ernst Linder (Finland) Carl Gustaf Mannerheim (Finland) Kurt Martti Wallenius (Finland) Voldemar Oinonen	(Soviet Union) Joseph Stalin (Soviet Union) Kirill Meretskov (Soviet Union) Kliment Voroshilov (Soviet Union) Semyon Timoshenko

Strength
10,397 men: (Sweden) 8,402 (Denmark) 1,010 (Norway) 895 (Finland) 13 tanks (Sweden) 26 aircraft Multiple Finnish army battalions	20,000-30,000 men 58 tanks 29 aircraft in combat

Casualties and losses
523: 245 killed 250 wounded 28 captured 6 fighters lost Specific casualties: Swedish: 23 killed on ground; 39 wounded on ground; 7 captured on ground; 140 disabled due to frostbite; 2 pilots killed; 3 fighters shot down; 3 fighters crashed; Finnish: 187 killed at Salla; 33 killed at Honkaniemi; 211 wounded at Salla; 111 wounded at Honkaniemi; 30 missing at Honkaniemi; 21 captured at Salla; 6 tanks at Honkaniemi	891: 640 killed 203 wounded 48 missing 9 tanks 4 fighters shot down 2 fighters damaged 6 bombers shot down 2 bombers damaged 7 more aircraft shot down 8 more aircraft damaged

The Swedish Intervention in the Winter War was a short-lived but successful attempt by the Swedish Volunteer Corps, along with other Nordic volunteers, to prevent a Soviet invasion of Finland during the Winter War. The volunteers only engaged in a few skirmishes on ground and in the air, the only major battles they participated in being the battles of Salla and Honkaniemi. The term "volunteers" have often been used to describe the Nordic military support for Finland in the Winter War, although involvement by the government of Sweden has been debated over time. Nevertheless, the Swedish military sent enormous amounts of aid to Finland, including:

- Approximately 2,000,000,000 SEK (US$ ~312,658,890) of financial aid - twice the size of the Finnish defense budget at the time
- 50,013,300 rounds of small arms ammunition
- 135,402 rifles
- 450 light machine guns
- 347 machine guns
- 301,846 artillery shells
- 144 field guns
- 92 anti-armor guns
- 100 anti-aircraft guns
- 300 sea mines
- 500 depth charges
- 83 motorcycles
- 83 cars
- 350 trucks
- 13 tractors
- 17 fighter aircraft
- 5 light bombers
- 1 transport aircraft
- 3 reconnaissance aircraft

== Background ==
The Winter War between Finland and the Soviet Union began in November 1939 after the Finnish government had rejected the Soviet claims to the Karelian Isthmus and all islands in the Gulf of Finland, as well as a demand to dismantle the defences in Finnish Karelia. Finland at the time was only officially allied with Estonia, as Sweden had rejected participation in the anti-Soviet alliance. The casus belli for the Soviet invasion was a claimed Finnish attack against the Russian village of Mainila, although it was later revealed that this was a false flag action conducted by the military of the Soviet Union.

== The battle of Salla ==
The battle of Salla was fought by Finnish-Swedish forces against the Soviet Union, beginning with a massive Soviet attack against the outnumbered Finnish defenders. Major General Kurt Martti Wallenius, the Finnish commander, ordered his men to retreat up the Kemijoki river where a defensive line could be easily maintained. After numerous suicide charges by the Soviet army, the sudden arrival of Swedish, Danish and Norwegian troops forced a Soviet withdrawal with heavy casualties of up to 500 men, compared to 187 among the Finns and 23 among the reinforcements.

== The battle of Honkaniemi ==
The battle of Honkaniemi was fought between Finnish and Soviet forces on 26 February 1940 and was the only tank battle of the Winter War. The Finns were supported by Swedish, Danish and Norwegian volunteers from the Nordic volunteer corps and had an unknown amount of infantry at their disposal (although it is known that they were much fewer than their Soviet enemies), as well as 13 Vickers 6-ton tanks. The Soviet corps of 58 tanks was able to beat back the attackers, losing 3 (Soviet sources) to 9 (Finnish sources) of their armored vehicles while Finland and its allies lost six. Added to that, 87 Finns and 140 Soviets were killed in the battle, while no casualties were reported among the volunteer corps. Although the Soviet casualties were larger than that of their adversaries, the Finnish colonel Voldemar Oinonen ordered a full retreat when he began to doubt the chances of defeating the enemy.

== See also ==
- MILITÄR HISTORIA issue 3 of 2013, pages 24–29 (primary source for this article)
