= Spanish use of chemical weapons in the Rif War =

Spanish chemical attacks in Morocco

During the Third Rif War in Spanish Morocco between 1921 and 1927, the Spanish Army of Africa deployed chemical weapons in an attempt to put down the Berber rebellion against colonial rule in the region of the Rif led by the guerrilla Abd el-Krim. In 1921, following the Rifian victory in the Battle of Annual, which was considered the worst Spanish military defeat of modern history, the Spanish army pursued a campaign of retribution involving the indiscriminate and routine dropping of toxic gas bombs targeting civilian populations, markets and rivers.

These attacks in 1924 marked the first widespread employment of chemical warfare in the post-WWI era and the second confirmed case of mustard gas being dropped from airplanes. While Spain signed the Geneva Protocol a year later, which prohibited the use of chemical and biological weapons, such use was not illegal in non-international armed conflicts.

While Spain pursued its chemical campaign in secrecy from the public, French intelligence provided Spain with weapon systems including tear gas and smaller gas agents, and a German company helped Spain obtain more effective chemical agents. The gas used in these attacks was produced by the "Fábrica Nacional de Productos Químicos" (National factory of chemical products) at La Marañosa near Madrid; a plant founded with significant assistance from Hugo Stoltzenberg, a chemist associated with clandestine chemical warfare activities in the early 1920s who was later given Spanish citizenship.

== Research and revelations ==
The Spanish bombings were covered up but some observers of military aviation, like Pedro Tonda Bueno in his autobiography La vida y yo (Life and I), published in 1974, talked about dropping toxic gases from airplanes and the consequent poisoning of the Rif fields. Likewise, Spanish Army air arm pilot Ignacio Hidalgo de Cisneros, in his autobiographical work Cambio de rumbo (Course change), reveals how he witnessed several chemical attacks. Years later, in 1990, two German journalists and investigators, Rudibert Kunz and Rolf-Dieter Müller, in their work Giftgas gegen Abd El Krim: Deutschland, Spanien und der Gaskrieg in Spanisch-Marokko, 1922-1927 (Poison Gas against Abd El Krim: Germany, Spain and the Gas War in Spanish Morocco, 1922-1927), proved with scientific tests that chemical attacks had indeed occurred. The British historian Sebastian Balfour, of the London School of Economics, in his book Deadly Embrace, confirmed massive use of chemical arms after having studied numerous Spanish, French and British archives. According to his research, the strategy of the Spanish military was to choose highly populated zones as targets. Additional evidence is found in a telegram from a British official, H. Pughe Lloyd, sent to the British Minister of War.

== Background ==
According to Sebastian Balfour, the motivation for the chemical attacks was based primarily on revenge for the defeat of the Spanish Army of Africa and their Moroccan recruits the Regulares at the Battle of Annual on July 22, 1921.

The Spanish defeat at Annual left 13,000 Spanish and Moroccan colonial soldiers dead according to the official count, many of them killed after surrendering to the Rif armies, and led to a major political crisis and a redefinition of Spanish colonial policy toward the Rif region. The political crisis led Indalecio Prieto to say in the Congress of Deputies: "We are at the most acute period of Spanish decadence. The campaign in Africa is a total failure, absolute, without extenuation, of the Spanish Army."

The Minister of War ordered the creation of an investigative commission, directed by the respected general Juan Picasso González, which eventually developed the Expediente Picasso report. Despite identifying numerous military mistakes, it did not, owing to obstructions raised by various ministers and judges, go so far as to lay political responsibility for the defeat. Popular opinion widely blamed King Alfonso XIII who, according to several sources, encouraged General Manuel Fernández Silvestre's irresponsible penetration of positions far from Melilla without having adequate defenses in his rear.

== Use of chemical agents ==
Spain was one of the first powers to use chemical weapons against civilians in their use against the Rif rebellion. Between 1921 and 1927, the Spanish army indiscriminately used phosgene, diphosgene, chloropicrin and mustard gas (known as Iperita). Common targets were civilian populations, markets, and rivers.

Spanish leaders justified their usage of gas by dehumanising the natives as uncivilised beings. The Spanish king reportedly called them "malicious beasts". In a secret letter to the king, a general described the Rif Moor as "completely irreducible and uncivilized... They despise all the advantages of civilization. They are hermetic to benevolence and fear only punishment". In a telegram sent by the High Commissioner of Spanish Morocco Dámaso Berenguer on August 12, 1921 to the Spanish minister of War, Berenguer stated:

I have been obstinately resistant to the use of suffocating gases against these indigenous peoples but after what they have done, and of their treacherous and deceptive conduct, I have to use them with true joy.

Spain used mustard gas as a force multiplier against native tribes who used rough terrain to their advantage.

On August 20, 1921, Spain asked Germany to deliver mustard gas via Hugo Stoltzenberg, although Germany was prohibited from manufacturing such weapons by the Treaty of Versailles of 1919. The first delivery occurred in 1923. The use of chemical weapons against the Rif was first described in an article of a (now defunct) Francophone daily newspaper published in Tangier called La Dépêche marocaine dated on November 27, 1921. Historian Juan Pando has been the only Spanish historian to have confirmed the usage of mustard gas starting in 1923. Spanish newspaper La Correspondencia de España published an article called Cartas de un soldado (Letters of a soldier) on August 16, 1923 which backed the usage of mustard gas.

According to military aviation general Hidalgo de Cisneros in his autobiographical book Cambio de rumbo, he was the first warfighter to drop a 100-kilogram mustard gas bomb from his Farman F60 Goliath aircraft in the summer of 1924. About 127 fighters and bombers flew in the campaign, dropping around 1,680 bombs each day. Thirteen of these planes were stationed in the military air base of Seville. The mustard gas bombs were brought from the stockpiles of Germany and delivered to Melilla before being carried on Farman F60 Goliath airplanes.

In the weeks preceding the Alhucemas landings, Spanish aircraft hit the Riffian rearguard with 20 kilograms (44 lb) C-5 bombs, produced in a factory in Melilla since 1922, each one carrying 6.5 kilograms (14 lb) of mustard gas. The goal was to provoke Riffian casualties in areas where no Spanish troops would be deployed until the effects of the chemical agent had dissipated. In a telegram sent to dictator Primo de Rivera on 29 August 1925, General Jose Sanjurjo reported that the mustard gas attacks on Riffian positions at Alhucemas had left 160 rebels dead and 180 blind, a figure that, though somehow inflated, roughly match the assessment disclosed by the Delegation of Indigenous Affairs (Delegación de Asuntos Indígenas) after the final defeat of Abd-el-Krim.

== Legacy ==
=== Alleged cause of disproportionately high cancer rates ===
Chemical weapons used in the region are alleged to be the main reason for the high occurrence of cancer among the population.

The Association for the Defence of Victims of the Rif War considers that the toxic effects of chemical warfare during the war are still being felt in the Rif region. Head of the Association of Toxic Gas Victims (ATGV) in the Rif said 50% of cancer cases in Morocco are concentrated in the Rif region and added that, “Research has shown there are strong indicators that the cancer is caused by the gases that were used against the resistance in the north.”

However, no independent scientific study has proven a relationship between the usage of chemical weapons and the high rate of cancer in the area.

=== Bill of acknowledgment ===
On February 14, 2007, the Catalan party of the Republican Left (Esquerra Republicana de Catalunya) passed a bill to the Spanish Congress of Deputies requesting Spain to acknowledge the "systematic" use of chemical weapons against the population of the Rif mountains. The bill was rejected by 33 votes from the governing Socialist Labor Party and the opposition right-wing Popular Party who form the majority in the Spanish parliament.

== See also ==
- Alleged British use of chemical weapons in Mesopotamia in 1920

== Bibliography ==
- Balfour, Sebastian, Deadly Embrace: Morocco and the road to the Spanish Civil War, Oxford University Press, 2002 ISBN 0-19-925296-3, Chapter 5 "The secret history of chemical warfare against Moroccans" (Google Books retrieved on October 14, 2009)
- Rudibert, Kunz; Rolf-Dieter Müller (in German), Giftgas gegen Abd El Krim: Deutschland, Spanien und der Gaskrieg in Spanisch-Marokko, 1922-1927 Rombach, 1990 ISBN 3-7930-0196-2.
- Rudibert Kunz, "Der Gaskrieg gegen die Rif-Kabylen in Spanish-Marokko 1922-1927" (abridged version of Kunz 1990), in Irmtrud Wojak, Susanne Meinl, Völkermord und Kriegsverbrechen in der ersten Hälfte des 20. Jahrhunderts, Frankfurt, 2004, pp. 153–192 (Google Books retrieved on October 14, 2009)
