= Ziva Ben-Porat =

Israeli academic

- זיוה בן-פורת
- Born: Vienna, Austria
- Education: Tel Aviv University and University of California, Berkeley
- Occupations: professor, writer, and editor
- Writing career
- Subjects: Intertextuality, poetics
- Notable work: "The Poetics of Literary Allusion"

Ziva Ben-Porat (Hebrew: זיוה בן-פורת) is a literary theorist, writer, and editor who lives in Israel and is a professor at Tel Aviv University.

== Personal life ==
Ben-Porat graduated with a bachelor's degree in English and Hebrew literature and a master's degree in English literature from Tel Aviv University, as well as a doctorate in comparative literature from University of California, Berkeley.

She lived for many years in Re'im, a kibbutz in southern Israel.

== Work ==
According to Jeremy Dauber, in Ben-Porat's notable 1976 publication, "The Poetics of Literary Allusion", she sought to "deploy a formal notion of allusive signification to frame specific readings of literary works." From 1993 to 2008, Ben-Porat was editor-in-chief of Sifrut/Mashmaut/Tarbut (English: Literature/Meaning/Culture), a series of academic books published by HaKibbutz HaMeuchad in Hebrew. From 2000 to 2008, she was director of The Porter Institute for Poetics and Semiotics. She was vice president of FILLM (Federation Internationale de Langues et Litteratures Modernes / International Federation for Modern Language and Literatures) from 2002 to 2005. She is currently a poetry and comparative literature professor at Tel Aviv University. Her academic work includes a focus on cognitive intertextuality, cultural memory, and cultural representations. Ben-Porat also works on CULTOS, a digital library of multimedia linked on the basis of their intertextual relations.

=== Publications ===
Publications that Ben-Porat has been published in or involved with include:

- "The Poetics of Literary Allusion", PTL 1, 1976
- Poetics Today, "Method in Madness: Notes on the Structure of Parody, based on Mad\s T.V. Satires", 1979
- Lyrical Poetry & the Lyrics of Pop, Tel-Aviv (Hebrew), 1989
- Literary Pragmatics, "Two Way Pragmatics: From World to Text and Back", London, 1991
- Autumn in Hebrew Poetry, Tel-Aviv (Hebrew), 1991
- Poetics Today, "Poetics of the Homeric Similie and Theory of [Poetic] Similie.", 1993
- The Psychology and Sociology of Literature, "Sad Autumn' and Cultural Representations: A Comparative Study of Japanese and Israeli 'Autumn", 2001
- Journal of Romance Studies, London, 2003

== Activism ==
In August 2010, she signed a letter, along with over 150 other academics, supporting a boycott by nearly 60 theatre professionals of a cultural center built in the West Bank settlement of Ariel. They also vowed not to lecture or participate in any discussions in the settlements, stating in their letter, "We will not take part in any kind of cultural activity beyond the Green Line, take part in discussions and seminars, or lecture in any kind of academic setting in these settlements." They explained their action by stating, "We'd like to remind the Israeli public that like all settlements, Ariel is also in occupied territory. If a future peace agreement with the Palestinian authorities puts Ariel within Israel's borders, then it will be treated like any other Israeli town."

In February 2015, Ben-Porat joined four others in resigning as a judge of the Israel Prize for Literature after the office of the Prime Minister of Israel vetoed two people who had been nominated to also serve as judges. In the resignation letter from Ben-Porat and four other judges, they said the action by the Prime Minister's office constituted “politicization of Israel’s most important prize, which is supposed to be granted solely on the basis of professional and artistic considerations,” and raised concerns that the award would be tainted.
