= Deadly Embrace =

Deadly Embrace can refer to:

- The Deadly Embrace, a novel by Robert J. Mrazek
- Deadly Embrace, a novel in the Madison Castelli series by Jackie Collins
- Deadly Embrace. Morocco and The Road to The Spanish Civil War, a book by Sebastian Balfour
- Deadly Embrace: Pakistan, America, and the Future of the Global Jihad, a book by Bruce Riedel

== See also ==
- Deadlock (computer science), a situation sometimes called a "deadly embrace"
