= Francisco García-Escámez =

Spanish military officer

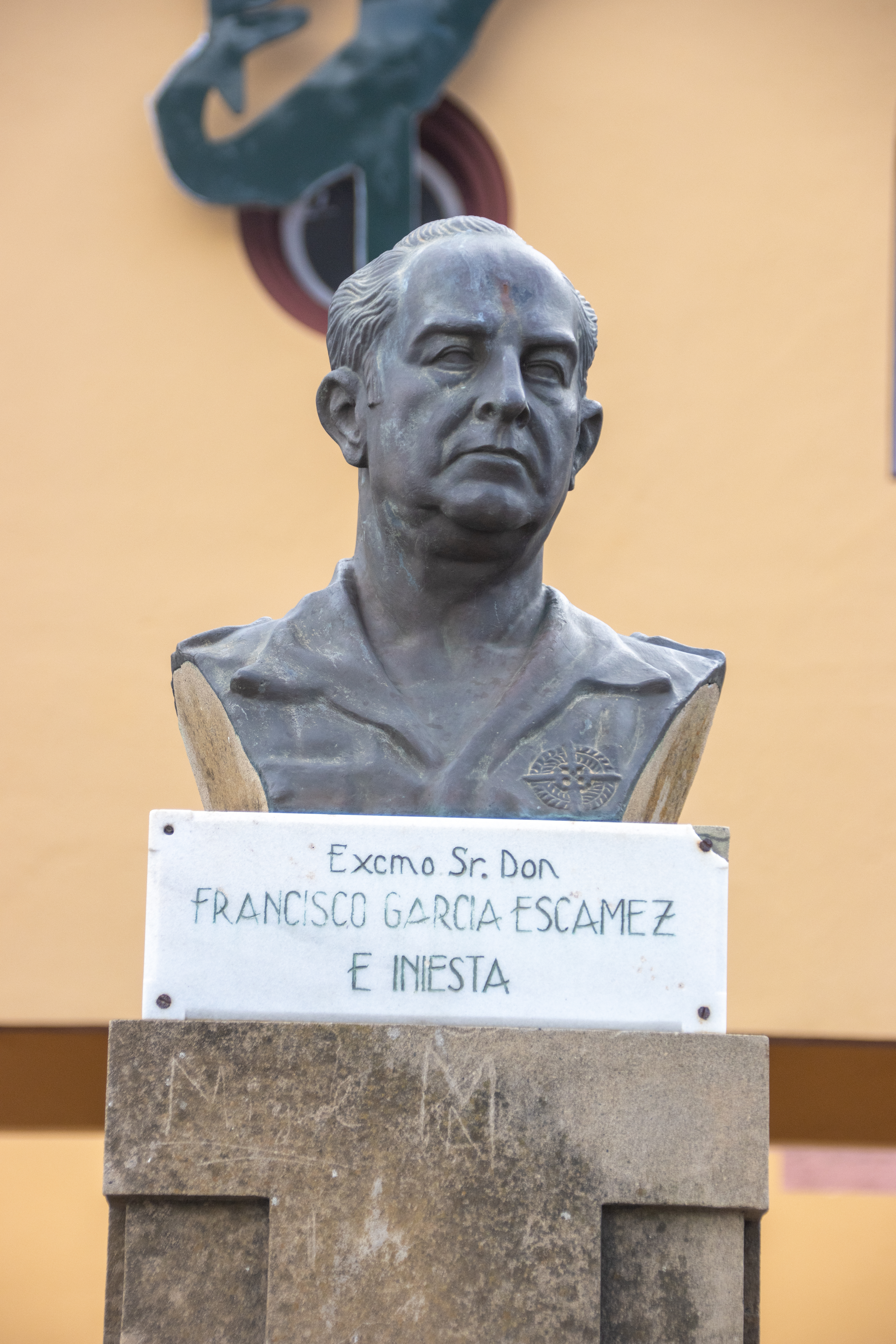
- Bust in Santa Cruz de La Palma
- Born: Francisco García-Escámez e Iniesta; 1 March 1893; Cádiz
- Died: 12 June 1951 (aged 58); Santa Cruz de Tenerife
- Burial place: Church of San Fernando Rey, Santa Cruz de Tenerife; 28°27′20″N 16°16′23″W
- Spouse: Isabel García-Ramos de la Corte
- Children: 3 (Francisco, Antonio and Carmen)
- Military career
- Allegiance: Nationalist Spain
- Branch: Spanish Army
- Rank: General
- Unit: Spanish Legion
- Commands: IV Military Region (1946); Captaincy General of the Canary Islands
- Conflicts: Rif War; Spanish Civil War
- Awards: Laureate Cross of Saint Ferdinand; Grand Cross (with White Decoration) of Military Merit (1943); Grand Cross of the Order of Beneficence (1947); Grand Officer of the Civil Order of Africa (1951)

Francisco García-Escámez e Iniesta, 1st Marquess of Somosierra (1 March 1893 – 12 June 1951) was a Spanish military officer who participated in the coup d'état against the government of the Second Republic, and then fought for the Nationalist faction in the Civil War.

== Biography ==
As an infantry soldier, he obtained the Laureate Cross of Saint Ferdinand for his actions in the Rif War. Stationed in Navarre, with the rank of colonel, he collaborated with General Emilio Mola in the preparation of the uprising.

=== Civil War ===
Once the Civil War began in July 1936, he commanded a Nationalist column composed of about a thousand men, mostly Falangist and Requeté volunteers, with which he left Pamplona in the direction of Madrid, overcoming strong Republican resistance in Alfaro; with his column he came to occupy Logroño on 20 July, arresting General Víctor Carrasco Amilibia, military commander, accusing him of indecision. The next day he passed through Soria and reached the outskirts of Guadalajara without taking it. On 23 July he arrived in Aranda de Duero, taking command of all the forces in the area and forming two groups – one of them commanded by Colonel Bartolomé Rada. (For a few months this group was called "Division of Soria", receiving the number 53 to later become 72nd and now, definitively, 73rd.) On 10 October he conquered Sigüenza, and subsequently commanded troops on the Somosierra fronts, and in the Battle of Jarama in February 1937, as well as later in the Battle of the Ebro. He was promoted to brigadier general in 1938. As a general, in the Aragon Offensive he commanded one of the four divisions of the Moroccan Army Corps under Yagüe, occupying Caspe on 17 March.

=== Military governor of Barcelona ===
He was military governor of Barcelona after the Civil War. On 13 April 1942, he was appointed military governor of Seville. At that time he was major general.

== Captain General of the Canaries ==
Subsequently, on 2 March 1943, he was appointed Captain General of the Canary Islands, As military commander of the Canary Islands, he carried out certain work of economic, social and cultural development that allowed overcoming the precarious conditions imposed by the isolation of the archipelago, caused by the Civil War and World War II.

== Recognitions ==
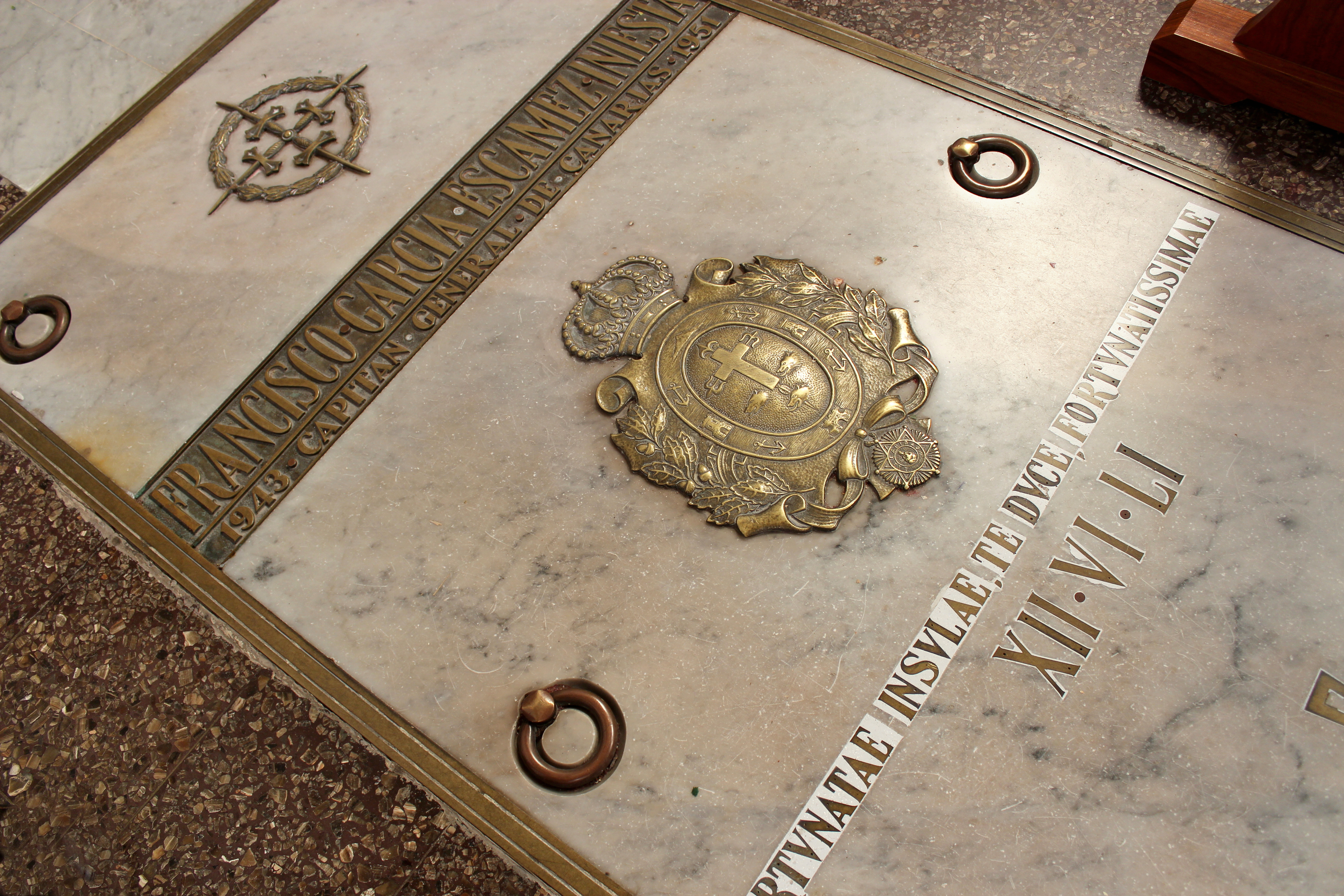
View of the tomb.

On 30 September 1943, he was awarded the Grand Cross (with White Decoration) of Military Merit. After his death, Francisco Franco granted him the title of Marquess of Somosierra. Currently, García-Escámez is buried in the Church of San Fernando Rey, in the García Escámez neighborhood of the city of Santa Cruz de Tenerife.

Military offices
Preceded by Eugenio Sanz de Larín; Interim	Captain General of the Canary Islands; 1943–1951	Succeeded by Carlos Martínez de Campos y Serrano
Spanish nobility
New creation	Marquess of Somosierra; 1952 (posthumous)	Succeeded by Francisco García-Escámez García-Ramos
