= Battle of Honkaniemi =

Battle of the Winter War

Battle of Honkaniemi (Lebedevka)
- Part of Winter War
- A Vickers tank wreck
Date	25–27 February 1940
Location	Karelian Isthmus, Finland 60°39′N 28°47′E
Result	Soviet victory

Belligerents
Finland	Soviet Union

Commanders and leaders
(Finland) Col. Voldemar Oinonen (Finland) Capt. I. Kunnas (Finland) Lt. O. Heinonen	(Soviet Union) Col. V. Kashuba (Soviet Union) Capt. V. S. Arkhipov (Soviet Union) Capt. A. Makarov

Strength
23rd Division: Jaeger Battalion 3; 4th Armoured Company; 4th Infantry Battalion; 2nd Artillery Battalion; Foreign Volunteers	84th Division: 35th Light Tank Brigade; 112th Separate Tank Battalion

Casualties and losses
33 casualties 6 tanks	3 tanks
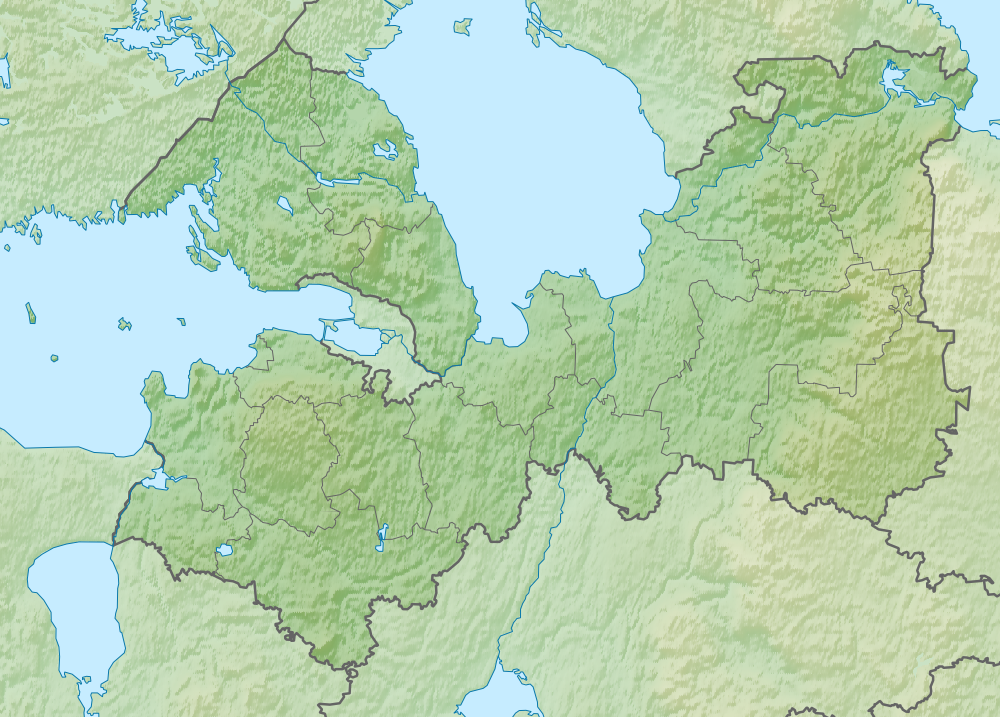
- Location within Leningrad Oblast Battle of Honkaniemi (Finland)

The Battle of Honkaniemi was fought between Finnish and Soviet forces on 26 February 1940. This battle was notable for being fought by tanks, the only time they were used en masse in combat by Finnish forces in the Winter War.

The commander of the Finnish II Corps, General Harald Öhquist, had attached the Jaeger Battalion 3 and the 4th company of the Armoured Battalion to the 23rd Division.

The 23rd was responsible for the area around Lake Näykkijärvi, just to the southeast of Viipuri, the second largest town in Finland. Also, the 3rd Battalion of the 67th Infantry Regiment that was on loan to the 5th division arrived as well, giving the reinforcement that the commander of the 23rd Division, Colonel Voldemar Oinonen, needed to launch an attack against the Soviets. At 10:15 pm, the commander of the Jaeger Battalion 3, Captain I. Kunnas and Lieutenant O. Heinonen of the 4th Armoured Company received orders to attack.

According to Chew, "It was here, near the small station of Honkaniemi, that the Finns launched their first and only armored attack. In the morning of 26 February six Vickers tanks, accompanied by Finnish infantry, broke thru the lines and approached the command post of a Soviet battalion. However, five of the tanks were destroyed, and thus this counterattack also failed."

== Plan ==
The original plan had involved six infantry battalions, four artillery battalions and the 4th Armoured Company. However, due to the haste to get the plan up and running, the planners missed important aspects of the battle, therefore reducing the overall number of units to four infantry battalions, two artillery battalions and the all-important 4th Tank Company.

== Assault ==
On the nights of 25 and 26 February, members of the Jaeger Battalion were carried by truck to Heponotko, which was about three km away from a depot in Honkaniemi (now Lebedevka). They then skied to the start point at 4:00 am. The tank company arrived around 30 minutes later after a 50 km march. That journey, however, cost them more than they would have liked. Since the conditions of the weather and roads were equally bad, the tank company lost five of their 13 Vickers 6-Ton tanks, mostly due to engine failure.

Seeing this as a major blow to their offensive capabilities, Captain Kunnas split his remaining tanks between the 1st, 2nd and 3rd Jaeger Companies. Six tanks were to support the Jaegers while two were to help the 1st secure the left flank. It was decided that the attack would commence at 5:00 am, but communication with the artillery battalions failed; so it was decided that they would try again at 6:15 am.

When communications with the artillery battalions were restored, the time had come to attack. However another setback had occurred. During the preliminary artillery barrage, some of the shells landed at the start point, resulting in 30 Finns being killed or wounded. The attack had to be postponed by another hour.

=== Beginning ===
After the initial bombardment by two artillery battalions (the 1st Battalions of the 5th and 21st Artillery Regiments), the attack commenced. Nevertheless, the Finns had had another set-back, another two tanks had been lost to technical failure, thereby reducing the total Finnish Tanks to only six for the entire battle. Even after all these set-backs, there were more to come. The 1st Jaeger Battalion had advanced some 200 meters before having to halt under heavy fire from the Red Army. The 1st Jaeger Company which was covering the left flank, advanced towards the railroad only to be unable to cross it. The 2nd and 3rd Jaeger Companies, which were the main attack force, had advanced to 200 meters southwest of the railroad, but had to be stopped.

=== Tank backup ===
The 4th Armoured Company had one of the worst days ever. One of its tanks got stuck in a ditch; the turret was damaged in the process and it had to retreat back to the starting point. The remaining five tanks were lost in a more honourable way, "being targeted by T-26s, T-28s and 45 mm anti-tank guns".

The platoon commander's tank, Lt.V. Mikkola's, advanced the farthest, almost 500 meters, almost into the Soviet lines. Only two Finnish tanks were able to destroy other Soviet tanks, the tank of Corporal E. Seppälä, which had kept on fighting after being immobilized, had taken out two Soviet tanks before the crew had to abandon their vehicle. The other tank was commanded by 2nd Lt. J. Virniö, which had destroyed one tank before being damaged.

=== Finnish retreat ===
Captain Kunnas received orders at 10:00 pm that he was to abort the attack and retreat. The Finns' first tank battle met with an unsuccessful end. The entire tank battle had been fought with inexperienced crews and almost no radio communication. In order to save money, the tanks had been bought from the UK without guns, optics and radios, and some even without the driver's seat. Due to the lack of vital equipment, communication between tanks was impossible and the tanks had to act upon their own judgement.

== Aftermath ==
The battle caused the deaths of one NCO while injuring two officers and two NCOs; three privates were reported missing in action. Even though the Soviets had a huge advantage over the Finns in numbers and weapons, the Finnish troopers pressed home the attack.

On 27 February 1940 the remaining eight tanks of the 4th Tank Company were ordered to move to the Rautalampi area for anti-tank duties.

According to Russian sources during the day of 26 February, six Finnish tanks were destroyed in two separate engagements. No losses to their own tanks were recorded. The journal of the 35th Armored Brigade states: "Two Vickers tanks with infantry backup advanced to the right flank of [the] 245th Infantry Regiment. Both enemy tanks were destroyed in the following battle. Four Vickers tanks moved to their help, but were destroyed by three T-26 tanks of companies commanders on [a] recon mission."

== See also ==
- List of Finnish military equipment of World War II
- List of Soviet Union military equipment of World War II
