= Combat history of the T-26 =

Combat history of Soviet light tank

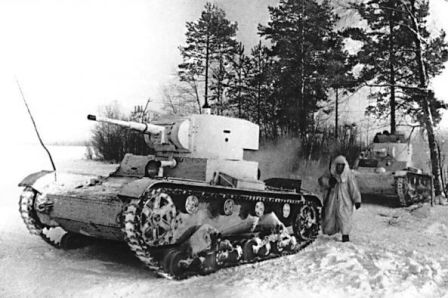
T-26 mod. 1933 light tanks from the 35th Light Tank Brigade advanced towards an attack line together with infantry. The Winter War, Karelian Isthmus. February 1940.

Though nearly obsolete by the beginning of World War II, the T-26 was the most important tank of the Spanish Civil War and played a significant role during the Battle of Lake Khasan in 1938 as well as in the Winter War. The T-26 was the most numerous tank in the Red Army's armoured force during the German invasion of the Soviet Union in June 1941. The Soviet T-26 light tanks last saw combat in August 1945, in Manchuria.

The T-26 was used extensively in the armies of Spain, China and Turkey. In addition, captured T-26 light tanks were used by the Finnish, German, Romanian and Hungarian armies.

== Prewar years ==
The first unit equipped with the T-26 was the 1st Mechanized Brigade named after K.V. Kalinovsky (the Moscow Military District). Tanks delivered to the Red Army through the end of 1931 were unarmed and intended for training, and the T-26 entered active service in 1932 only. The first series-produced T-26 tanks were shown to the public during the military parade on Red Square in Moscow on 7 November 1931—the 14th anniversary of the October Revolution. New mechanized brigades, each equipped with 178 T-26 tanks, were also organized at that time. The RKKA Staff decided to form larger tank units based on experience gained in military exercises of 1931–1932: so mechanized corps were created in the Moscow Military District, the Ukrainian Military District and the Leningrad Military District in autumn 1932. Each mechanized corps consisted of two mechanized brigades (one equipped with the T-26 and another with the BT). From 1935, mechanized corps were equipped only with BT tanks.

When series production of the T-26 mod. 1933 started, each tank platoon consisted of three vehicles (one single-turreted mod. 1933 and two twin-turreted mod. 1931 tanks). Later, the majority of twin-turreted T-26 tanks were given to combat training depots and to tank battalions of rifle divisions (in the beginning of 1935 tank battalion of rifle division consisted of 3 companies, 15 T-26 tanks in each).

In August 1938 mechanized corps, brigades and regiments were reorganized into corresponding tank units. In the end of 1938 the Red Army had 17 light tank brigades (267 T-26 tanks in each) and 3 chemical tank brigades (equipped with flame-throwing tanks based on the T-26 chassis).

== Spanish Civil War ==
The Spanish Civil War was the first conflict in which the T-26 participated. At the request of the Spanish Republican government, the Soviet government sold weapons and military equipment to Spain and provided military advisers (including crews) within the framework of Operation X. The first shipment of tanks to Spanish republicans was delivered on 13 October 1936, at the Spanish port city of Cartagena; fifty T-26s with spare parts, ammunition, fuel, and around 80 volunteers under the command of colonel S. Krivoshein, the commander of the 8th Separate Mechanized Brigade. The first German delivery of armoured vehicles to Franco's insurgent Nationalist forces was of Panzer I light tanks for the Condor Legion, which arrived only a week later. The Italians had begun to provide Nationalists with CV-33 tankettes even earlier, in August 1936.

Republican and Nationalist tanks saw their first combat during the advance of Franco's forces towards Madrid, and during the Siege of Madrid, where the Nationalist Panzer I and CV-33 tankettes suffered heavy losses from Republican tanks armed with 45mm guns. The first Soviet T-26 tanks delivered to Cartagena were intended for Republican tank crews training in the Archena training center (90 km from Cartagena), but the situation around Madrid became complicated and fifteen tanks formed a tank company under the command of a Soviet officer, Pols Armans.

Armans' company engaged in battle on 29 October 1936 near Seseña, 30 km south-west of Madrid. Twelve T-26s advanced 35 km during the ten-hour raid and inflicted significant losses to Francoists (around two squadrons of Moroccan cavalry and two infantry battalions were defeated; twelve 75 mm field guns, four CV-33 tankettes and twenty to thirty trucks with cargo were destroyed or damaged) with the loss of 3 T-26 tanks to gasoline bombs and artillery fire. The first known instance of ramming in tank warfare was made that day when the T-26 tank of platoon commander Lt. Semyon Osadchy encountered two Italian CV-33 tankettes from the Nationalist 1st Tank Company near Esquivias village and overturned one of them into a small gorge. Crewmembers of another tankette were killed by tank machine-gun fire after they abandoned their vehicle. The T-26 of Armans was burned by a gasoline bomb; although wounded, Armans continued to lead the tank company. Armans' T-26 destroyed one, and damaged two CV-33 tankettes by tank gun fire. On 31 December 1936 Armans was awarded with the Hero of the Soviet Union for that tank raid and active participation in the defense of Madrid. On 17 November 1936, Armans' company had five T-26 tanks in operable condition.

The day before (28 October 1936) Francoist cavalry and Panzer IA tanks from the 88th Tank Battalion met with Republican T-26 tanks. The Pz.IA proved to have insufficient armament when pitted against the T-26.

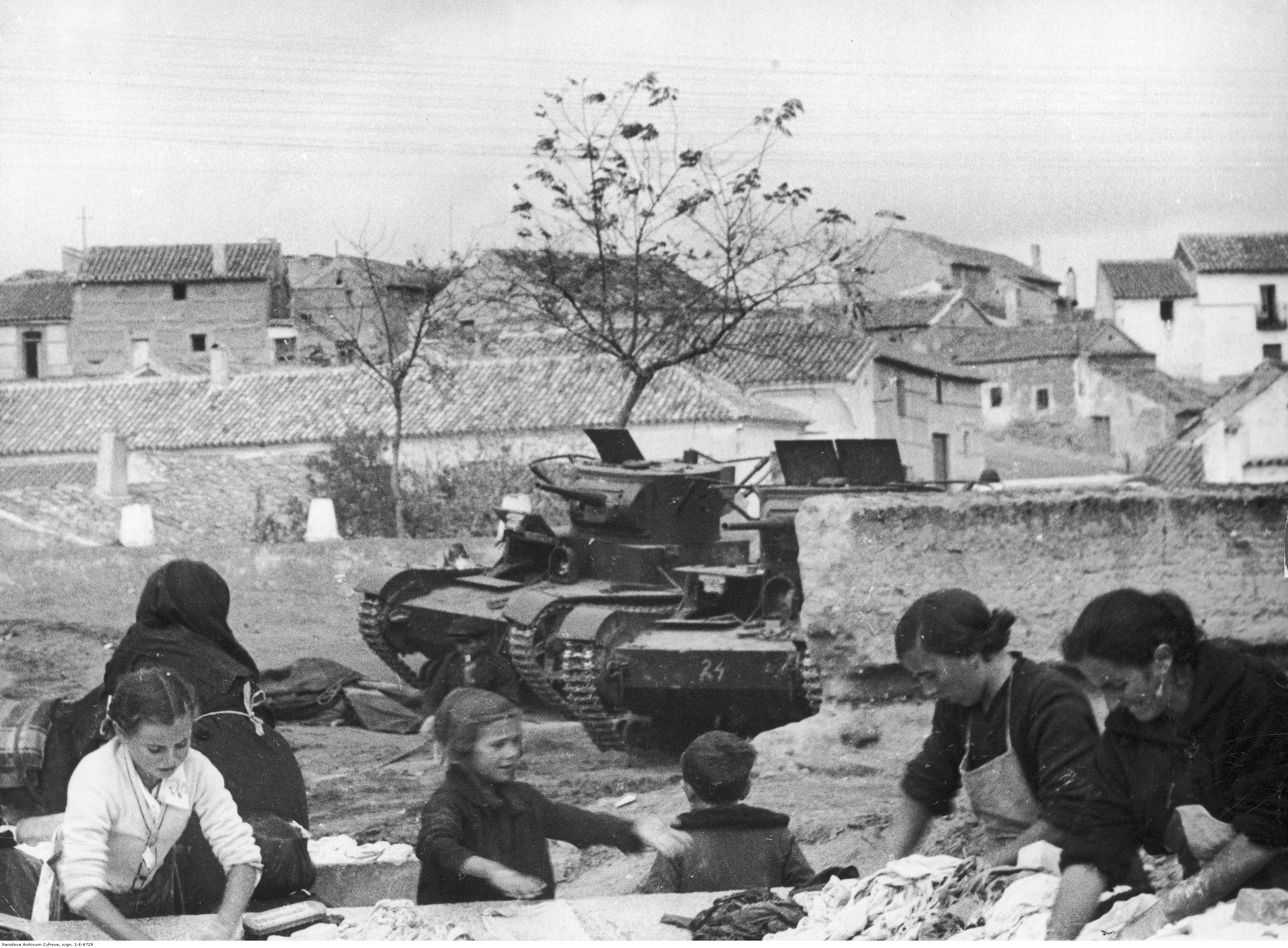
Soviet T-26 tanks captured and pressed into service by Spanish Nationalist forces.

The Krivoshein's tank group, consisting of 23 T-26 tanks and 9 armoured cars, attacked Francoists on 1 November 1936, supporting the main Republican column retreating to Madrid. The Krivoshein's tank group took part in the fighting for Torrejón de Velasco and Valdemoro on 4–5 November 1936, a counter-attack in the suburb of Cerro de los Ángeles on 13 November 1936, and in continuous fighting inside Madrid itself through the middle of December 1936. Soviet military personnel of Krivoshein's group returned to the USSR in the end of November 1936, except for some tankers from Pogodin's company, mechanics from Alcalá de Henares tank repair base and military instructors from the Archena training center.

The 1st Republican Tank Brigade initially consisted of a tank battalion, a Spanish motorcycle company and a transport battalion. It was created in December 1936 on the delivery of about 100 Soviet tanks and military personnel under the command of Soviet brigade commander D. Pavlov at the Archena training center. The Soviet volunteer tank commanders and drivers sent to Spain were from the best tank units of the Red Army: the Mechanized Brigade (named after V. Volodarsky) from Peterhof, the 4th Separate Mechanized Brigade from Babruysk (commander – D. Pavlov), and the 1st Mechanized Corps named after K.B. Kalinovsky from Naro-Fominsk. The tank gunners were usually Spanish.

The 1st Republican Tank Brigade (1.^{a} Brigada Blindada) first saw action near Las Rosas and Majadahonda (north-west of Madrid) in the beginning of January 1937, supporting the 12th and 14th International Brigades. This action broke up the second Nationalist assault on Madrid.

There were around 70 T-26s in the Republican Army in the beginning of 1937. In February 1937, company-sized detachments of the Tank Brigade participated in the Battle of Jarama. On 14 February 1937 the Tank Brigade, together with the 24th Infantry Brigade, took part in a counterattack and overcame a major Nationalist force, causing about 1000 Nationalist casualties. On 27 February 1937, the Tank Brigade launched five attacks on Nationalist positions without infantry support, but took heavy losses from anti-tank guns (35 to 40 percent of its tanks in some attacks). Nevertheless, the T-26 was used with great success during the Battle of Guadalajara in March 1937 after the 1st Tank Brigade was finally formed (its HQ was in Alcalá de Henares). For example, a platoon of two T-26 tanks under the command of Spaniard, E. Ferrera destroyed or damaged twenty-five Italian tankettes on 10 March 1937. In September/October 1937 the Republican 1st Tank Brigade was disbanded. Some volunteers returned to the USSR, while others joined with the International Tank Regiment under the command of Soviet major S.A. Kondratiev.

From autumn 1937, all T-26 tank crews were Spanish. In summer 1938, the Republican Army had two armoured divisions, formed with Soviet help. Turrets from irreparable T-26 and BT-5 tanks and from BA-6 armoured cars were mounted on Chevrolet 1937s and other armoured cars developed and produced by the Republicans. Republican armour and infantry often suffered from cooperation problems throughout the war. T-26 tanks often attacked enemy trenches or defense positions in the narrow streets of Spanish towns without support, where they met strong resistance. Nationalist infantry, the Moroccans especially, defended courageously despite heavy casualties, throwing hand grenades and gasoline bombs, which are dangerous to tank engines.

Ultimately, the Soviet Union provided a total of 281 T-26 mod. 1933 tanks, which were used by the Republicans in almost all the battles of the Spanish Civil War. Many sources state that a total of 297 T-26s were delivered to Spain but this probably includes the first planned delivery of 15 T-26s on 26 September 1936.

Approximately 40 percent of T-26s fell into Nationalist hands by the end of the war, mostly after the defeat of the Republicans. In March 1937, a tank company of captured T-26 tanks was included into Panzergruppe Drohne, a tank unit of the German Condor Legion in Spain. The Nationalists prized the Soviet tanks, even offering a bounty of 500 pesetas for each tank captured intact. In August 1937, a reorganization of the Drohne Group into Spanish control started, which resulted in the formation of Bandera de Carros de Combate de la Legion, a part of the Spanish Foreign Legion, in March 1938. The Bandera consisted of two battalions (1. and 2. Agrupaciones de Carros). One was equipped with Panzer I tanks and the second with captured T-26 tanks. Approaching 1939, both battalions had similar organization, their third companies equipped with T-26 tanks. The Nationalists used captured T-26 tanks in the Battle of Teruel, Battle of Brunete, Battle of Bilbao, Battle of the Ebro and the Catalonia Offensive. The Nationalists developed their own light tank prototype (Verdeja) during the war, with the wide use of elements from Panzer I, and especially the T-26. Later, T-26s formed the base of the Spanish Brunete Armoured Division, serving until 1953.

The T-26 was the most widely used tank of the Spanish Civil War in both armies. It was referred to as "the tank of the Spanish Civil War" in the title of one of Lucas Molina Franco's articles. "Out-gunned, out-manoeuvred, and hard-pressed, the Spanish had no effective answer to the tank", sparking several interesting developments within the context of tank design and anti-tank tactics. This was especially true regarding the T-26, given that there was no other tank in the field able to knock it out. Despite the T-26's superiority over the German Panzer I light tanks and Italian CV-33 tankettes (armed only with machine guns), the Spanish Civil War uncovered a vulnerability of the T-26 – weak armour. Even the frontal armour of the T-26 was easily penetrated by German and Italian anti-tank guns., at close ranges. Italian reports said about this vulnerability: 20 mm Italian and German guns, not effective over 400 m; 3.7 cm Pak 36, not more than 500 m; Cannone da 47/32 M35, not more than 600 m. The Italians were concerned about the powerful armament of the T-26, often used at very great ranges, up to 1,500 m. Italians rated the small and older Cannone da 65/17 modello 13 as better than the high-velocity guns they had, even if it was not used as an anti-tank gun. Greater danger was posed by the 8.8 cm FlaK 18/36/37/41 anti-aircraft gun, first deployed in those years, and capable of destroying any tank at very great range. The 15 mm bullet-proof armour of the T-26 provided little protection against it, even when firing only HE rounds. Not all Soviet military commanders recognized the T-26 light infantry tank's obsolescence in the mid-1930s and work designing tanks with antiprojectile armour was slow in the USSR at that time.

== Soviet-Japanese border wars 1938–1939 ==
The first military operation of the RKKA in which T-26 light tanks participated was the Soviet-Japanese border conflict, the Battle of Lake Khasan in July 1938. The Soviet tank force consisted of the 2nd Mechanized Brigade and two separate tank battalions (the 32nd and the 40th). These included 257 T-26 tanks (with 10 KhT-26 flame-throwing tanks), 3 ST-26 bridge-laying tanks, 81 BT-7 light tanks, and 13 SU-5-2 self-propelled guns. The 2nd Mechanized Brigade had new command staff as 99% of its previous command staff (including brigade commander A.P. Panfilov) were arrested as "enemies of the nation" three days before marching off. That had an adverse effect on brigade actions during the conflict (for example, its tanks spent 11 hours to finish a 45 km march because of ignorance of the route). During the assault of the Japanese-held Bezymyannaya and Zaozernaya bald mountains, Soviet tanks met with a well-organized antitank defense. As a result, 76 T-26 tanks were damaged and 9 burnt. After the end of combat operations, 39 of these tanks were restored in tank units and others were repaired in workshop conditions.

There were only 33 T-26s, 18 KhT-26 flame-throwing tanks and 6 T-26T artillery tractors in tank units of the 57th Special Corps on 1 February 1939. For comparison, the corps had 219 BT tanks. The situation with the T-26 remained as before in July 1939: the 1st Army Group, which participated in the Battle of Khalkhin Gol in Mongolia, had only 14 T-26s (in the 82nd Rifle Division) and 10 KhT-26 flame-throwing tanks (in the 11th Tank Brigade). The amount of T-26 tanks (flame-throwing variants mainly) increased somewhat in time for combat actions in August, but they always remained a small fraction of all tanks that participated in the conflict. Nevertheless, the T-26s were used extensively in action. The T-26 proved to be a very good tank during the Battle of Khalkhin Gol according to army reports: its cross-country capability in desert conditions was excellent and, despite thin armour (which was easily penetrated by Japanese 37 mm guns), the T-26 exhibited high survivability. Some T-26 tanks continued to fight after several 37 mm hits and did not catch fire, as happened more frequently with BT tanks.

== Second World War ==
=== Soviet invasion of Poland ===
On the eve of World War II, the Red Army had around 8,500 T-26s of all variants. These served mainly in 17 separate light tank brigades (each brigade had 256–267 T-26s in four battalions, including 10–11 flame-throwing tanks) and in 80 separate tank battalions of some rifle divisions (each battalion had 10–15 T-26 light tanks in the first company and 22 T-37/T-38 amphibious tanks in the second one). Such types of tank units participated in the Soviet invasion of Poland (or, as it is called in Russian historiography, "the liberation march" to West Ukraine and West Belarus), sixteen days after the beginning of the German Invasion of Poland (1939).

On 17 September 1939, 878 T-26 tanks of the Belorussian Front (the 22nd, the 25th, the 29th and the 32nd Tank Brigades) and 797 T-26 tanks of the Ukrainian Front (the 26th, the 36th and the 38th Tank Brigades) crossed the Polish border. Combat losses in Poland amounted to 15 T-26 tanks only. However, 302 T-26s suffered technical failures on the march.

=== The Winter War ===
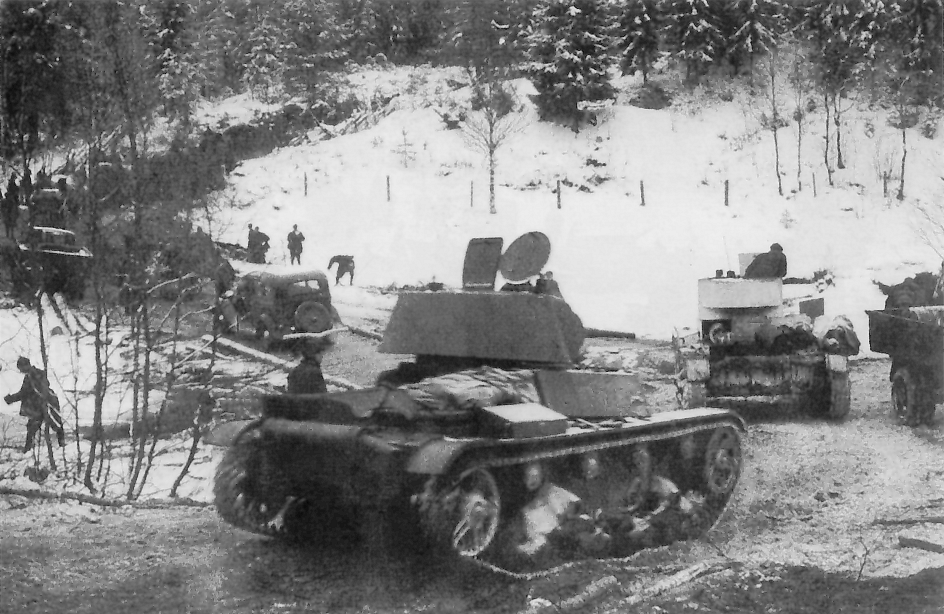
Soviet T-26 light tanks (mod. 1939 and mod. 1933), GAZ-M1 car and GAZ-AA trucks of the 7th Army during its advance on the Karelian Isthmus. 2 December 1939.

The following tank units, equipped mainly with the T-26, participated in the war with Finland: the 35th, the 39th and the 40th Light Tank Brigades, eight separate tank battalions (OTBs) of rifle divisions of the 8th and the 14th Armies. In the course of the war, the 29th Light Tank Brigade, tank units of the 28th Rifle Corps (four tank regiments, a dozen OTBs of rifle divisions, six separate tank companies of rifle regiments), and five OTBs included into the 9th Army arrived to the front.

Light tank brigades in the Winter War were equipped a variety of T-26 tanks, including both twin- and single-turreted tanks produced from 1931 to 1939. Separate tank battalions of rifle divisions had old tanks mainly, produced in 1931–1936. But some tank units were equipped with new T-26 mod. 1939 tanks. A total of 848 T-26s were in tank units of the Leningrad Military District by the beginning of the war. Together with the BT and T-28, the T-26 was part of the main strike force during the breakthrough of the Mannerheim Line, in which tanks shelled antitank teeth, Finnish pillboxes, machine-gun nests, and other fortifications.

War experience forced change in the structure of Soviet tank units. T-37 and T-38 amphibious tanks proved to be useless under the conditions found in the northern theatre of operations. In accordance to the letter order of the General Military Council of the RKKA from 1 January 1940, each rifle division should have a tank battalion consisting of 54 T-26 tanks (including 15 flame-throwing tanks) and a rifle regiment should have a tank company of 17 T-26s. The organization of seven tank regiments (164 T-26s in each) for motor rifle and light motorized divisions began at that time also, but only two light motorized (motor cavalry) divisions were formed – the 24th and the 25th.

Old, twin-turreted T-26 tanks were also used during the Winter War, mainly in OTBs of rifle divisions. These tanks did not participate in active combat operations but were suitable for protecting communication lines and used in signal service. Nevertheless, some T-26 mod. 1931 tanks were used in combat on the Karelian Isthmus. For instance, the 377th OTB of the 97th Rifle Division arrived at the front on 28 January 1940 with 31 T-26s (including 11 twin-turreted) and 6 KhT-26 flame-throwing tanks.

Among tank units, equipped with the T-26, the actions of the 35th Light Tank Brigade (commander – colonel V.N. Kashuba, from January 1940 – colonel F.G. Anikushkin) were the most noteworthy. The brigade had 136 T-26 tanks of different models, 10 KhT-26 flame-throwing tanks and 3 ST-26 engineer tanks on 30 November 1939. In the beginning, the brigade was involved into combat for Kiviniemi and later it was redeployed to Hottinen area where its tanks, suffering high losses and shortage of repair facilities, supported the attacks of the 123rd and the 138th Rifle Divisions till the end of December. In January tankers of the 35th Brigade evacuated and repaired their T-26s, practised in cooperation with artillery, engineer and rifle units, and manufactured wooden fascines for trench crossing which were placed in special towed sleds. By the breakthrough of the main defensive positions of the Mannerheim Line, battalions of the brigade were attached to the 100th, the 113th and the 123rd Rifle Divisions.

On 26 February 1940, six Finnish Vickers 6-ton tanks (armed with 37 mm 37 psvk 36 gun) from the 4th Tank Company (4./Pans.P) suddenly met with three T-26 mod. 1933 tanks from the 35th Light Tank Brigade (these were tanks of the 112th Battalion's company commanders going on the reconnaissance) and vanguard of Soviet rifle battalion near Honkaniemi. As the result of the combat, one Finnish tank was damaged by hand grenades and evacuated by the Finns, and five others were knocked out by T-26s, which suffered no losses.). The T-26 of captain V.S. Arkhipov knocked out three Vickers tanks from these five, and was lightly damaged in combat (Finnish shell from Vickers No. 667 hit the main fuel tank but Soviet tank driver switched to the small fuel tank).

The 8th Army, which fought north of Lake Ladoga, had 125 T-26s in separate tank battalions (OTBs) of rifle divisions on 30 November 1939. Tank platoons suffered significant losses because of poor infantry reconnaissance of Finnish positions and ambushes, and absence of engineer support. For instance, on 19 December 1939 six T-26s with 50 infantrymen from the 75th Rifle Division were sent to attack the Finns, the tanks fell into a Finnish ambush on the road and were destroyed. The situation with arms cooperation became somewhat better toward the end of the war, nevertheless. But if the actions were planned well, tank attacks were often successful – for instance, the platoon of the 111th OTB broke through enemy defense and rescued the encircled infantry battalion without losses on 9 December 1939. The combat losses of the 8th Army included 65 T-26s during the war (56 tanks were lost to artillery fire and 9 – to landmines).

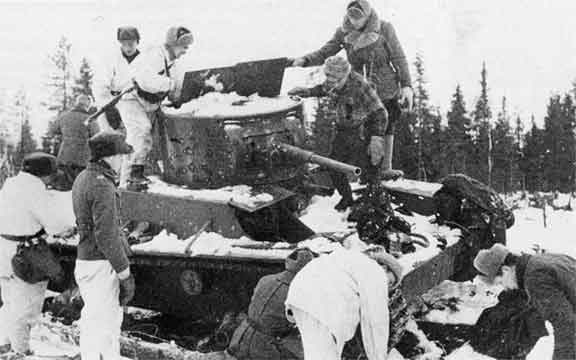
Finnish soldiers inspecting an abandoned Soviet T-26 mod. 1933 at Raate. January 1940.

The 9th Army (Repola, Kandalaksha and Suomussalmi area) received tank units, equipped with T-26s, in the course of the war only – for example, the 100th and the 97th OTBs had 47 T-26s each (including twin-turreted T-26 mod. 1931 armed with the 37 mm Hotchkiss gun for which there were no ammunition), the 302nd OTB was equipped with 7 twin-turreted T-26s. Despite inexperienced personnel and worn old models of T-26 tanks, battalions of the 9th Army fought very well. Thus, two tanks from the 100th OTB broke into Mjärkjärvi, pursuing retreating Finns, on 11 December 1939. The tank company from the 100th OTB together with infantry group crushed the Finnish ambush near Kuokojärvi on 8 December 1939, encircled and captured the town next day. The platoon from the 97th OTB destroyed Finnish firing-points between Alasenjärvi and Saunojärvi lakes, which helped Soviet rifle regiment to enter the last one.

The favourable experience of the 100th OTB which successfully performed independent missions cross-country was not taken into consideration, and many Soviet commanders believed till the end of the war that tanks could be used along the roads only. Poor reconnaissance and absence of artillery preparation often resulted in tragic circumstances – in such a way, the platoon of the 100th OTB lost five tanks to single Finnish anti-tank gun near Kursu (Lapland) on 14 December 1939, battalion executive officer was among 9 men killed in action. The combat losses of the 9th Army were 30 T-26s during the war.

In the polar Murmansk region, the 14th Army had the 411th OTB, equipped with 15 T-26 and 15 T-38 tanks from the Belorussian Military District, and the 349th OTB, equipped with 12 T-26 and 19 T-37/T-38 tanks from the Training Regiment of the Leningrad Armour Technical School. The narrow terrain only allowed the use of two or three T-26 tanks in co-operation with a rifle company or battalion. Tanks of 411th OTB attached to the 52nd Rifle Division were used the most actively. The 349th OTB concentrated in Petsamo on 13 December 1940 where it joined the 104th Rifle Division. The 14th Army lost three tanks to artillery fire, two to landmines, and two drowned.

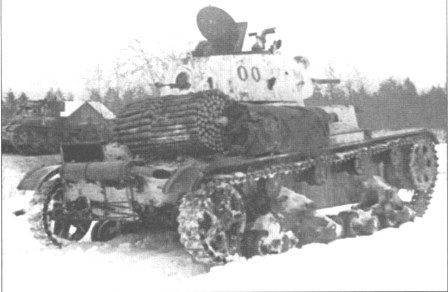
Soviet T-26 mod. 1939 of the 40th Light Tank Brigade in winter camouflage on the way to battlefront. Note a small fascine for trench crossing, a canvas stowage and a tactical marking "00" on turret side. Karelian Isthmus. February 1940.

At the Battle of Tolvajärvi and afterwards, the Finnish managed to capture or destroy nearly 12 T-26 tanks during the defeat of the 75th Rifle Division. At the battles of Suomussalmi and Raate, the Soviet 44th Rifle Division was encircled and lost all armour of its 312th OTB, including 14 T-26s. Altogether, the Finns would capture almost 70 T-26 tanks of different models, including KhT-26 and KhT-130 flame-throwing tanks, during the Winter War, a number equal to the entire pre-war Finnish armoured force.

The combat and technical losses of the 7th Army in action on the Karelian Isthmus from 30 November 1939 to 13 March 1940 were 930 T-26 tanks of all variants, with 463 of these repaired during the war. All told, losses of T-26 tanks exceeded the number in inventory at the beginning of the war, but the number of T-26s at the front did not decrease due to reinforcements received from factory and tank workshops and new tank units arriving at the front. There were 1,331 T-26, BT and T-28 tanks at the Northwest Front in the beginning of February 1940, which increased to 1,740 tanks on 28 February 1940 when the breakthrough of the second Finnish line of defense began. For example, the 29th Light Tank Brigade (commander – brigade commander S. Krivoshein) with 256 T-26s was redeployed from Brest to the Karelian Isthmus in February 1940. The brigade played a key role in the assault of Vyborg on 12–13 March 1940.

In the end, the Winter War proved that the T-26 was obsolete and its design reserve was totally depleted. Finnish anti-tank guns easily penetrated T-26's thin anti-bullet armour, and its cross-country ability in the rough terrain, covered with deep snow, was mediocre because of low-powered engine. It was decided to withdraw the outdated T-26 from production in 1940 and replace it with a completely new model, the T-50 light tank.

=== The German-Soviet War ===
The T-26 formed the backbone of the Red Army's armoured forces during the first months of the German invasion of the Soviet Union in 1941. On 1 June, the Red Army had 10,268 T-26 tanks of all models, including armoured combat vehicles based on the T-26 chassis. The T-26 made up 39.5 percent of the tank strength, by number. T-26s composed a majority of fighting vehicles in Soviet mechanized corps of border military districts. For example, the Western Special Military District had 1,136 T-26 tanks on 22 June 1941 (52% of all tanks in the district). Mechanized corps of the Southwestern Front (formed from units of Odessa Special Military District and some units of Kiev Special Military District after the beginning of the war) were equipped with 1,316 T-26 tanks, making up 35% of all tanks on the front. All in all there were 4,875 T-26 tanks in western military districts on 1 June 1941. However, some T-26 tanks were not operationally ready because of shortages of parts like batteries, tracks, and road wheels. Such shortages left around 30% of available T-26 tanks disabled. Additionally, about 30% of the available T-26 tanks had been produced in 1931–1934 and had limited service life. Thus five Soviet western military districts had about 3,100–3,200 T-26s of all models in good order (approximately 40% of all tanks in the districts in question), which was only slightly less than the number of German tanks intended for invasion of the USSR.

By the summer of 1941, most of the Red Army's vast numbers of tanks were suffering from serious wear and tear. Poor quality roads, the vulnerabilities of track design in the early 1930s, and inadequate maintenance, recovery and repair services all took their toll. In some of the front line armoured units, up to half of the T-26, T-28 and BT tanks had major drive train components (engine, transmission or suspension) which were broken down or completely worn out, and these disabled tanks were parked and cannibalised for spare parts to keep the rest running. Tanks damaged during the 1939 Winter War with Finland were also cannibalised for parts.

The planned replacement for the T-26 was the T-50 light tank, adopted for the Red Army in February 1941. The sophisticated T-50 was developed keeping in mind the experience gained in the Winter War and Soviet tests of the German Panzer III tank. However, the new and complicated T-50 and its diesel engine encountered production problems and the new tank had not entered series production before the German-Soviet War.

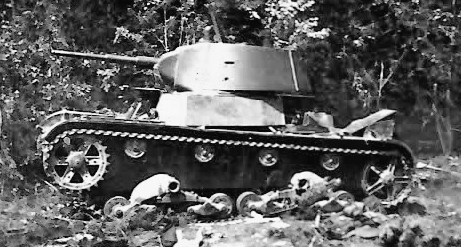
Abandoned T-26 mod. 1939. Operation Barbarossa.

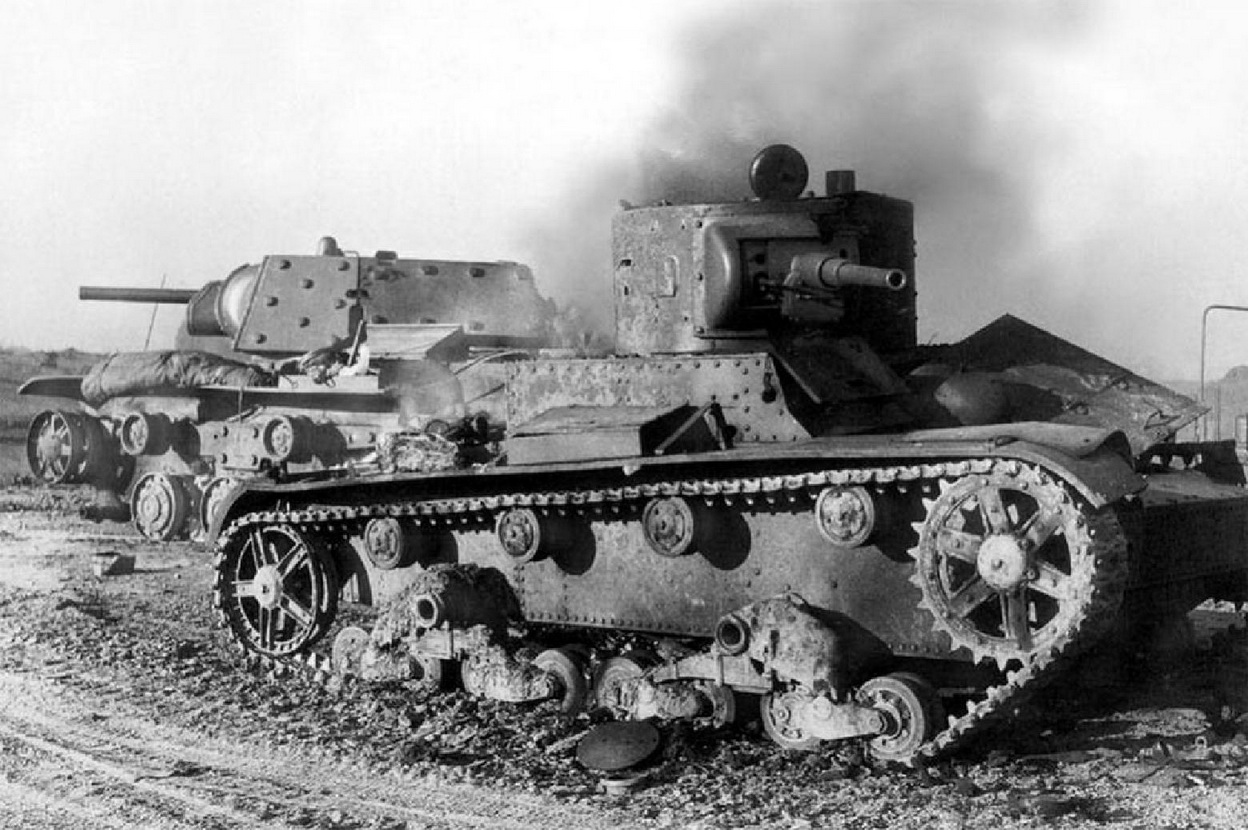
Knocked out Soviet T-26 mod. 1933 light tank and abandoned KV-1 heavy tank with additional appliqué armour in the background. Summer 1941.

The majority of the Red Army's T-26 tanks in European military districts were lost in the first months of the German-Soviet War, mainly to enemy artillery and air strikes.

In addition, the limited availability of recovery vehicles and spare parts meant that broken down tanks and other non-combat losses often could not be repaired. Tanks with even insignificant technical failures had to be blown up or burned by their crews upon retreat. The 12th Mechanized Corps, deployed in Baltic Special Military District, had 449 T-26 tanks, 2 flame-throwing tanks and 4 T-26T artillery tractors on 22 June 1941. The corps lost 201 T-26 tanks and all flame-throwing tanks and artillery tractors by 7 July 1941. A further 186 T-26 tanks were lost to technical failures.

However, many T-26 crews did their best to combat the enemy's advance. For example, a composite battalion of the 55th Tank Division (made up of 18 single-turreted T-26 tanks and 18 twin-turreted T-26 tanks) supported the retreating 117th Infantry Division near Zhlobin. Single-turreted T-26 tanks destroyed 17 German tanks. Nine tanks of the battalion crossed the Dnieper River but eleven remained in enemy territory after the bridge was destroyed, with the remainder having been lost in combat.

The T-26 light tank was inferior to the German Panzer III and Panzer IV medium tanks in gun calibre, speed, manoeuvrability, armour but the T-26's armament was superior in comparison with the Panzer I, Panzer II, Panzer 35(t) and Panzer 38(t), which formed about 50% of the German panzer forces in June 1941. The Soviet 45 mm 20K tank gun could also penetrate the armour of Panzer III and Panzer IV at combat distances. The main reasons for the high loss rate of Soviet light tanks in June–July 1941 were the low production quality of 45 mm armour-piercing shells (which were themselves in short supply in tank units), the insufficient power of 45 mm 20K tank guns produced in 1932–1934, and poor coordination between different units of the Red Army. German air superiority and frequent technical problems with older tanks also plagued Soviet forces.

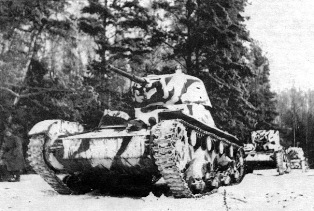
A column of T-26 mod. 1939 and T-26 mod. 1933 light tanks from the 20th Tank Brigade moved towards a front line. The Western Front, Battle of Moscow. December 1941. The 20th Tank Brigade was equipped with 20 T-26 tanks.

Despite high losses, T-26 tanks still formed a significant part of the Red Army's armoured forces in autumn 1941 (many tanks arrived from inner military districts – Central Asia, Ural, Siberia, partially from the Far East). Tank units of the Western Front were equipped with 298 T-26 tanks on 1 October 1941, equivalent to 62% of total tank forces. However, many old T-26 tanks received by tank brigades from repair workshops were in poor technical condition and as the result there were only 50 T-26 tanks (14 of them under repair) available during the German advance in the Battle of Moscow. T-26 tanks participated in the Liberation of Rostov in December 1941 also.

T-26 tanks participated in combat at the Leningrad Front in 1941. For example, the 86th Separate Tank Battalion, equipped with the T-26, supported attacks of Soviet infantry from Kolpino towards Krasny Bor and Tosno on 20–26 December 1941. One case of a T-26 in action there is well documented: during six days of continuous attacks and counterattacks, platoon commander Third Lieutenant M.I. Yakovlev's T-26 destroyed two pillboxes, three anti-tank guns, four machine-gun nests, three mortars and an ammunition depot in Krasny Bor, in addition to killing about 200 enemy soldiers. Yakovlev's T-26 was penetrated by nine shells, but was never taken out of action. 3rd Lt. Yakovlev received the Hero of the Soviet Union award.

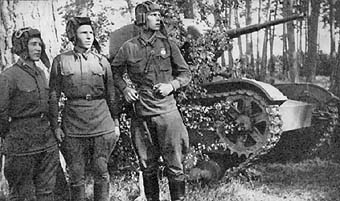
T-26 mod. 1938 and its crew before combat. Probably 1942.

T-26 tanks continued to be used in combat throughout the Soviet-German front from the Barents Sea to the Black Sea (Battle of the Crimea) in 1942, but in steadily decreasing numbers as each T-26 tank that was destroyed or lost to technical problems was being replaced by a T-34. During the Second Battle of Kharkov, some tank units of the 22nd Tank Corps of the Southwestern Front were equipped with the T-26 (for example, the 13th Tank Brigade had six T-26 tanks on 9 May 1942). On 13 May 1942, German forces counterattacked the flank of the Soviet 38th Army, then on the offensive. Every available tank unit engaged the German battle group consisted from about 130 tanks of the 3rd and the 23rd Panzer Divisions. Three Soviet tank brigades lost all of their tanks, but inflicted heavy losses on the enemy.

The last major operations of the German-Soviet War which involved substantial numbers of T-26 tanks were the Battle of Stalingrad and the Battle of the Caucasus in 1942. Though the T-26 saw no active action on the main Soviet-German front in 1943, the T-26 still equipped some rearward units. Thus T-26 tanks of the 151st Tank Brigade (the 45th Army, Transcaucasian Front), equipped with 24 T-26s and 19 British Mk VII Tetrarch light tanks, guarded the Soviet-Iranian border. This tank brigade was redeployed to Tuapse (47th Army) in January 1943.

On the less active portions of the Soviet-German front, some tank units of the encircled Leningrad Front used their T-26 tanks till the beginning of 1944, when the breaking of Leningrad Blockade began (for example, the 1st and the 220th Tank Brigades each had 32 T-26 tanks on 1 January 1944). T-26s with applique armour were used there till summer 1944. In the Karelia and Murmansk area (another stabilized part of the Soviet-German front) T-26s served even longer, until late summer of 1944.

=== Anglo-Soviet invasion of Iran ===
T-26 tanks from the 6th and the 54th Tank Divisions of the 28th Mechanized Corps (which had 717 T-26 and BT light tanks on 1 May 1941) participated in Anglo-Soviet invasion of Iran in August–September 1941.

=== Soviet-Japanese War 1945 ===
The Soviet invasion of Manchuria was the last military operation in which Soviet T-26 was used. The Red Army had 1,461 T-26s in the far east on 5 August 1945 (1,272 of these were in operable condition). There were many old tanks (mainly T-26 and BT-7 tanks) in far eastern separate tank brigades; these had remained on the Manchurian border during the entire German-Soviet War. To increase the combat effectiveness of these tank units, 670 new T-34-85 tanks were issued to one battalion of each brigade in summer 1945, leaving the other two battalions with their T-26 or BT-7 light tanks as before. For example, the 1st Far Eastern Front had 11 separate tank brigades (80–85 tanks in each, half T-26 or BT) at that time. There were some number of T-26s in 2 tank divisions and 5 tank brigades of the Transbaikal Front. Such tank units participated in the defeat of the Japanese Kwantung Army in August 1945. T-26s often demonstrated better cross-country ability in the far eastern theater of operation than much heavier T-34-85 and Lend-Lease M4 Sherman medium tanks. Also, the T-26's performance was still sufficient to fight against Japanese armoured vehicles. T-26 tanks participated in the victory over Japan parade in Harbin in September 1945.

== Outside the Red Army ==
After the end of the Spanish Civil War and the capture of Spanish Republican military equipment including T-26s, Franco's Spain received some additional T-26s from France which had been taken from retreating Republican forces and interned in French warehouses. In 1942, the Spanish Army had 139 T-26 mod. 1933 light tanks in service. After the end of World War II, Spain had at least 116 T-26s, mainly in the Brunete Armoured Division. The T-26 tanks would not be replaced until 1953, when Spain and the United States signed an agreement for open shipments of new military materiel to Spain. The first twelve M47 Patton tanks, dedicated to replace the old T-26 tanks, arrived at Cartagena in February 1954.

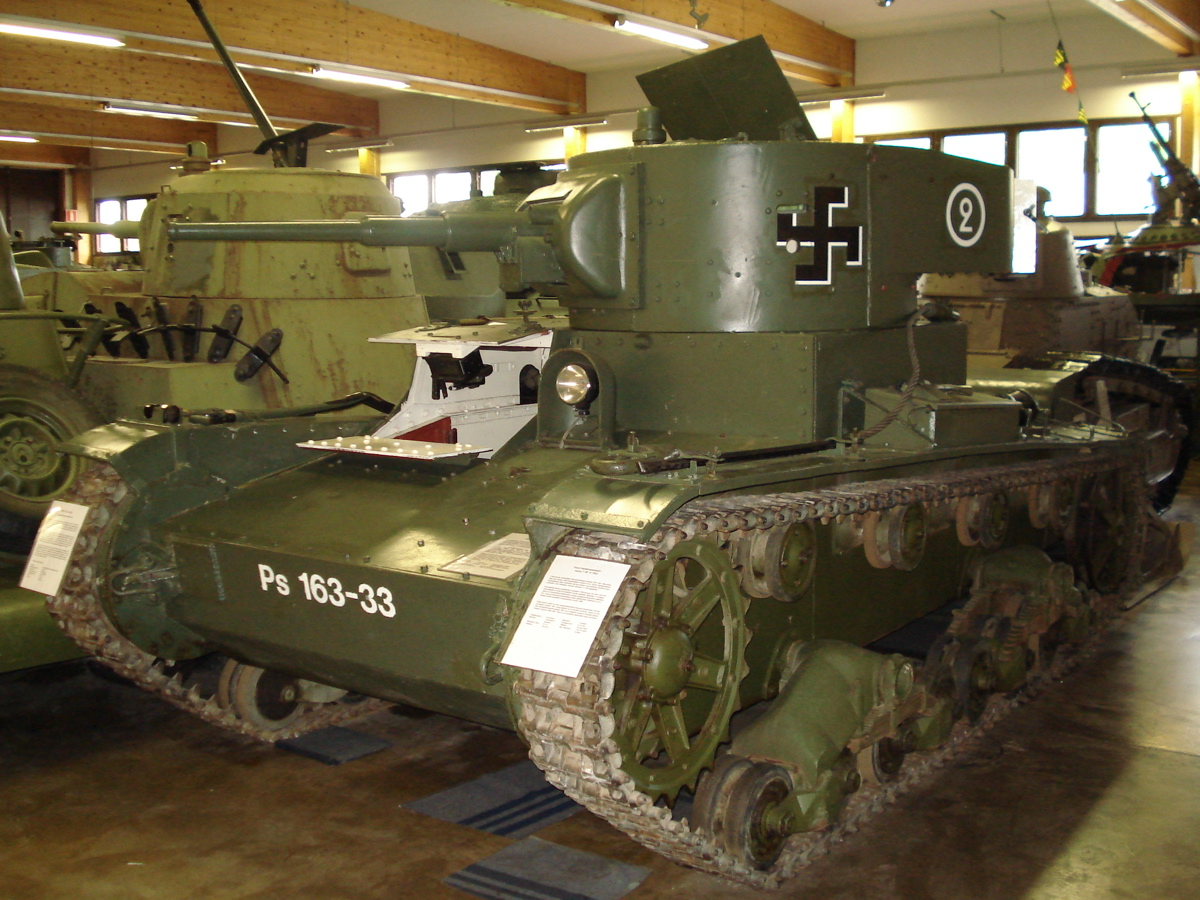
T-26 mod. 1933 displayed in Parola Tank Museum. This captured tank was used by the Finns during the Continuation War. The vehicle has been restored to drivable condition.

The Finns captured and evacuated nearly 70 T-26 tanks of different models (including KhT-26 and KhT-130 flame-throwing tanks) during the Winter War. Of these, 10 T-26 mod. 1931, 20 T-26 mod. 1933, 2 T-26 mod. 1938/1939, 2 KhT-26 and 4 KhT-130 were repaired at the Varkaus Tank Workshop and put into service until June 1941. The Finns also rearmed their Vickers 6-Ton tanks with the Soviet 45 mm 20K gun and the coaxial DT tank machine gun for ammunition standardization with captured T-26s. These modified Vickers tanks under designator T-26E were used by the Finnish Army during the Continuation War for infantry support.

During the offensive phase of the Continuation War in summer and autumn of 1941, the Finns captured more than 100 T-26s of different models (including several tanks with applique armour). Of these, 35 were fully repaired and sent to the Armoured Battalion, 21 were stored for later refurbishment, and the remainder were scrapped. There were 102 T-26s in the Finnish Army on 1 January 1942 (twin-turreted and flame-throwing tanks were used as training vehicles). The Armoured Battalion was reorganized into the Armoured Brigade (consisting of two battalions) on 10 February 1942.

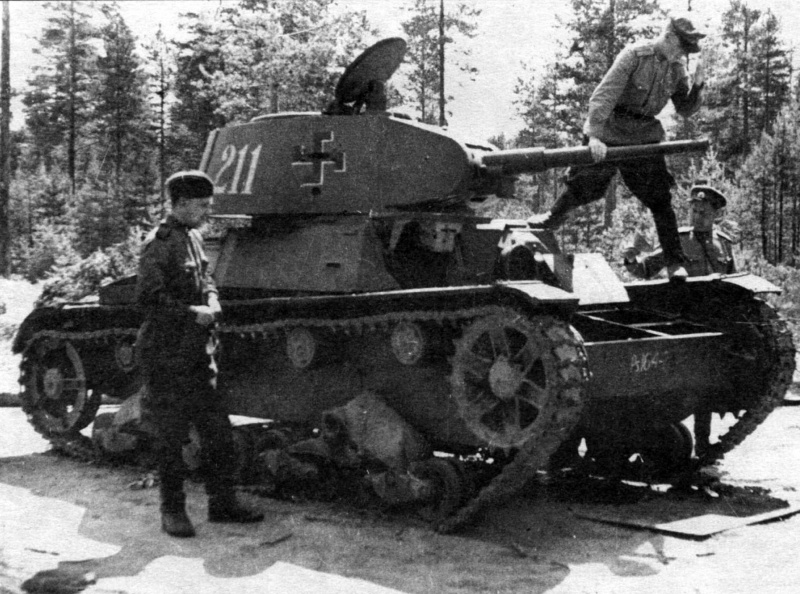
Soviet officers inspecting an abandoned Finnish KhT-133 flame-throwing tank, which was rearmed with 45 mm 20K gun and DT tank machine gun. Karelia. 1944.

The Finns modernized their T-26s in 1942–1943. Eight T-26 mod. 1931 tanks received turrets from the single-turreted T-26 or BT tanks. Additionally, turrets from irreparable T-26s or BTs of different models were mounted on KhT-26s, KhT-130s and KhT-133s, which had flame-throwing equipment removed. A ball mount for the DT tank machine gun was installed on some of these tanks in the front armoured plate of the underturret box. In addition, some Finnish T-26s had a modified driver's hatch opened to the left as well as a different kit of spare parts tools, and many tanks were equipped with a special rear beam for towing guns and damaged vehicles.

The T-26 remained the main tank of the Finnish Armoured Division throughout the war, although the German StuG III began to replace it in 1943. Peak numbers in Finnish service occurred during the summer of 1944, when the Finns kept up to 126 various T-26 tanks, including 22 rebuilt Vickers 6-Ton (T-26E), 2 T-26 mod. 1931, 1 KhT-26, 63 T-26 mod. 1933, 36 T-26 mod. 1938/1939, and 2 T-26T artillery tractors. About 75 T-26s and 19 T-26Es continued in service after the end of the World War II. Some of these tanks were kept as training vehicles until 1960, when they were finally phased out and replaced by newer British and Soviet tanks. In January 1960, the Finnish Army still had 21 T-26 tanks of various types in service, and the last Finnish T-26 was officially retired in 1961.

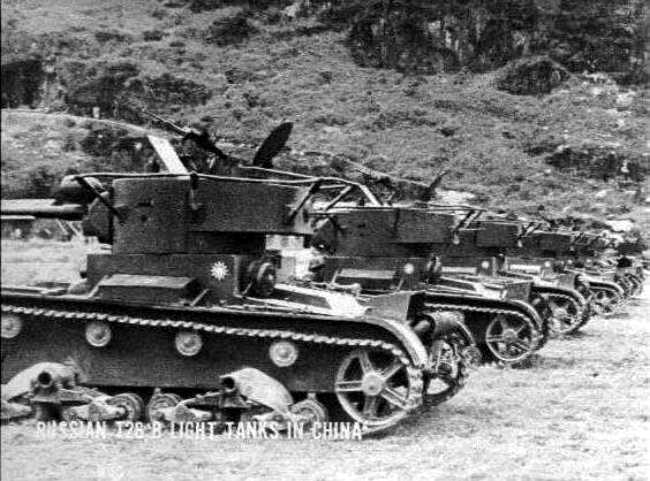
Chinese NRA T-26 mod. 1933 light tanks at Hunan.

In August 1937, the Chiang Kai-shek's government negotiated with the Soviet government for military aid for the War of China's Resistance Against Japan (1937–1945) during a signing of a Treaty of Non-Aggression between the Republic of China and the Soviet Union. The USSR sold 82 T-26 mod. 1933 tanks to China. These tanks were shipped to Guangzhou harbour in the spring of 1938, and used to set up the 200th Infantry Division of the Chinese National Revolutionary Army. The 200th Infantry Division was actually a mechanized division consisting of four regiments, including a tank regiment equipped with 70 or 80 T-26s, an armoured car regiment, a mechanized infantry regiment, and an artillery regiment.

Chinese tank crews were trained under the supervision of Soviet specialists. T-26 tanks of the 200th Infantry Division were used in the Battle of Lanfeng in 1938, the Battle of Kunlun Pass in 1939, the Battle of Yunnan-Burma Road in the Burma campaign in 1942 and some other combat against the Japanese until 1944. After World War II, the remaining Chinese T-26 tanks equipped the First Armoured Regiment of the Army of the Chinese Kuomintang government, which saw service in East China during the Chinese Civil War (1946–1950). Several T-26 tanks were destroyed or captured by the People's Liberation Army during the Huaihai Campaign in 1949. Some surviving T-26s moved to Taiwan when KMT government left mainland China and later retired.

In 1935, Turkey purchased 60 T-26 mod. 1933 light tanks from the USSR (also, two twin-turreted T-26 mod. 1931 were presented to Turkish government in 1933–1934), along with about 60 BA-6 armoured cars to form the 1st Tank Battalion of the 2nd Cavalry Division at Lüleburgaz. The Armoured Brigade of the Turkish Army consisted of the 102nd and the 103rd Companies armed with the T-26 mod. 1933 tanks (four platoons in a company, five tanks in platoon) in the end of 1937. The reserve group of the brigade had 21 T-26 tanks also. In the beginning of 1940, the Turkish Army had the Armoured Brigade in Istanbul, which belonged to the 1st Army, and the 1st Tank Battalion, which belonged to the 3rd Army. Turkish T-26 tanks were taken out of service in 1942.

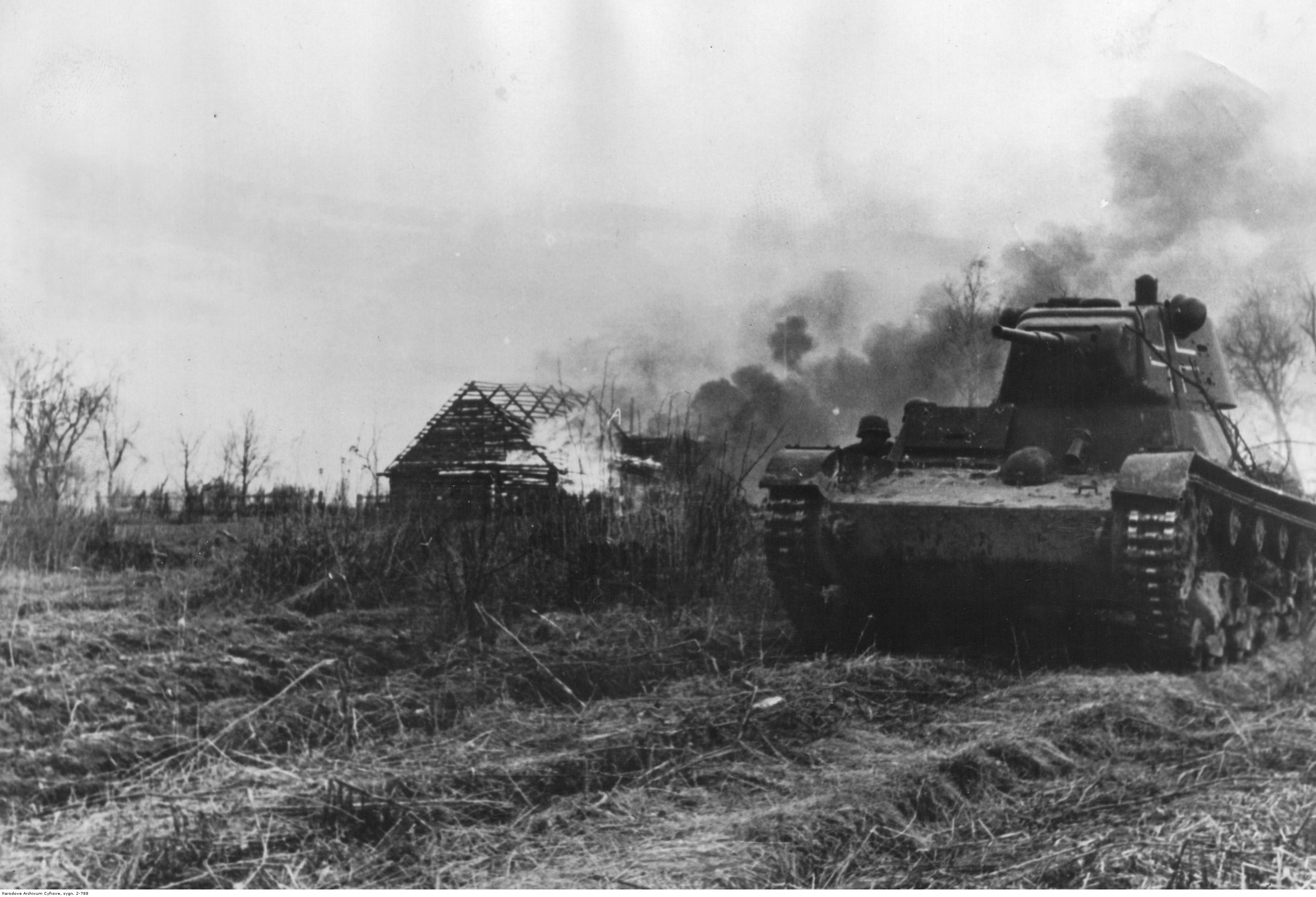
A T-26 pressed into service with the German Wehrmacht operating in the area of Lake Ilmen in 1942.

The German Wehrmacht used around 40 captured T-26 tanks of different models under the designation Panzerkampfwagen 737(r), 738(r), or 740(r), depending on the model. KhT-130 flame-throwing tanks had the German designation Flammenwerfer Panzerkampfwagen 739(r). Only a very small number of captured T-26 tanks were repaired by German army workshops by the end of 1941; hundreds of Soviet tanks abandoned in summer-autumn 1941 during the Soviet retreat were badly damaged in combat or had technical failures which were impossible to repair because of the absence of spare parts, and Germany's own tanks were a higher maintenance priority. A small number of German T-26 tanks participated in the Battle of Smolensk (1941), the Battle of Moscow, Battles of Rzhev, combat near Leningrad and Bryansk, in the Minsk Offensive and the Warsaw Uprising in 1944. They were used by several rifle and tank units including the 3rd SS Division Totenkopf. Also German police tank companies (Polizei-Panzer-Kompanien) used a few captured T-26s, including obsolete twin-turreted tanks, in Soviet and Polish occupied territories.

In autumn 1943, ten German T-26 tanks were rearmed as self-propelled guns (the turrets were removed and ex-French 7.5 cm guns Pak 97/38(f) with shields were installed instead). Those 7.5 cm Pak 97/98(f) auf Pz.740(r) self-propelled guns served in the 3rd Company of the 563rd Anti-tank Battalion (3 Kp. Pz.Jg.Abt. 563) but all of them were replaced soon with the Marder III on 1 March 1944.

The Royal Romanian Army had 33 captured T-26s of different models as of 1 November 1942, mainly donated by Germany. However, the Romanians could not repair most of the captured vehicles and so not all were used in combat. For example, the 1st Tank Division had only 2 T-26 tanks in September 1942. The Hungarian Army also used a few captured T-26 mod. 1933 tanks.

It is probable that two twin-turreted T-26 mod. 1931 light tanks were sold to Afghanistan in 1935, but this information is unconfirmed.
