= Battle of Jarama =

1937 Spanish Civil War conflict

Coordinates: 40°13′4.44″N 03°30′14.52″W

- Part of the Spanish Civil War
- Map of the battle
Date	6–27 February 1937
Location	Arganda del Rey, Madrid, Spain
Result	Indecisive

Belligerents
(Spain) Spanish Republic: International Brigades	(Francoist Spain) Nationalist Spain: Irish Brigade; Germany

Commanders and leaders
(Spain) José Miaja (Spain) Vicente Rojo Lluch (Spain) Sebastián Pozas Perea (Spain) Enrique Líster (Spain) Valentín González; Robert Merriman	(Francoist Spain) José Enrique Varela (Francoist Spain) García Escámez (Francoist Spain) Carlos Asensio (Francoist Spain) Fernándo Barrón Ortiz

Strength
~30,000 infantry (June 15); 30 tanks	25,000–40,000 infantry ~40 guns 55 tanks

Casualties and losses
10,000–20,000 dead, wounded, or captured	6,000–20,000 dead, wounded, or captured

The Battle of Jarama (6–27 February 1937) was an attempt by General Francisco Franco's Nationalists to dislodge the Republican lines along the river Jarama, just east of Madrid, during the Spanish Civil War. Elite Spanish Legionnaires and Moroccan Regulares from the Army of Africa forced back the Republican Army of the Centre, including the International Brigades, but after days of fierce fighting no breakthrough was achieved. Republican counterattacks along the captured ground likewise failed, resulting in heavy casualties to both sides.

== Preliminaries ==
By winter of 1936–37 the Nationalist forces, led by General Francisco Franco, having failed to carry Madrid by storm in November 1936, resolved to cut off the city by crossing the Jarama to the south east and severing Madrid's communications with the pro tempore Republican capital of Valencia.

General Emilio Mola was in overall command of the Nationalist forces around Madrid and planned an offensive across the Jarama 11 km (6.8 mi) south of the capital. General Luis Orgaz y Yoldi was put in command of the front, with General José Enrique Varela exercising command in the field. The attack had been intended to coincide with an offensive by Franco's Italian allies under General Mario Roatta at Guadalajara, but the Italians were not ready in time and Mola decided to press ahead without them. The Nationalists had roughly 25,000 infantry, mostly regulares and Spanish Foreign Legionnaires. Mola also had ten squadrons of cavalry at his disposal. They were supported by German troops from the Condor Legion, including two heavy machine gun battalions, a tank corps under Wilhelm Ritter von Thoma and batteries of 155 mm and 88 mm guns.

The initial objectives of the Nationalists were to take the western bank of the river Jarama and to capture the heights that overlooked it. Next, they would break through the Republican positions on the high ground east of the river and take the towns of Vaciamadrid and Arganda in order to sever the Madrid–Valencia road and cut off the capital to the south and east.

Flag of the Popular Front which hosted the International Brigades

== Taking the west bank ==
After a period of heavy rain, the Nationalist offensive began on 5 February with assaults on the Republican positions on the west bank of the Jarama. The opening attacks took the Republicans by surprise. The Nationalists, as was the fashion of the Army of Africa, advanced in mobile brigade-sized columns and overwhelmed the unprepared Republicans. Colonel García Escámez commanded their right flank (to the south), Colonel Ricardo Rada commanded the left, or northern wing, while in the centre there were three brigades under Colonels Jose Asensio, Saenz de Buruaga, and Fernando Barron. Escámez attacked on 6 February at Ciempozuelos and overran the Republican forces from 18 Brigade which lost 1,300 men. Rada's men took La Marañosa hill, 700 metres (2,300 ft) high, which overlooked both banks of the Jarama. The two Republican battalions atop La Marañosa vainly stuck to their cliff-top defences and fought there to the last man. By 8 February the west bank of the Jarama was in Nationalist hands and on 9 February Rada's troops had secured the high ground opposite Vaciamadrid.

While the Nationalists had managed to quickly gain their objectives on the flanks, those in the centre had not fallen so easily. Saenz de Bruaga's brigade managed to secure Gozquez de Abajo, about 1 km (0.62 mi) from the Jarama and Asensio's column had taken San Martin de la Vega, ultimately the force that had been allocated to the centre of the Nationalist advance proved too small to effect a breakthrough during the initial assault. Although elements of General Sebastián Pozas' Army of the Centre had begun to take flight, the Republican line was stabilized when Enrique Líster and El Campesino showed up with their veteran brigades on 8 February. Reinforcements appeared on the east bank of the Jarama and the Republic's army reorganized its defences, forestalling any enemy crossing. In addition, heavy rain flooded the river and held up fighting for two days.

== Nationalists cross the river ==
Flag of the National Faction.

On 11 February a small group of Moroccan regulares crossed the river undetected and crept up to the positions of the Republican XIV International Brigade near the Pindoque railway bridge at Vaciamadrid. As they had learned to do in the Rif War, the regulares slipped inside the enemy perimeter and silently cut the throats of the sentries. Nationalist cavalry under Barrón followed them across almost immediately and attacked the fleeing XIV International Brigade. Nearby, Barrón's column, braving heavy Republican fire, charged across the Arganda Bridge and established a bridgehead on the other side. The Republicans had laid demolition charges on the bridge, but although they were detonated, the bridge remained intact. Further south, Asensio attacked the village of San Martín de la Vega, where Republican machine gunners brought his advance to grief before being silenced by Moroccan and Legionnaire knifework.

At this point, Nationalist troops under Varela crossed the river in force. However, the Republicans remained firmly entrenched along the Pingarrón heights on the eastern bank and continued to plaster the Nationalist bridgeheads with artillery fire. Barrón's brigade was held up by the Garibaldi Battalion, which held the high ground near Arganda. Late in the day, units of XI International Brigade held off a Nationalist push onto the Arganda–Colmenar road. The Republicans then counterattacked twice with Soviet T-26 tanks, which were beaten off with artillery fire from Nationalist batteries dug in on La Marañosa, but they served to hold up further Nationalist advances. When Junkers of the Condor Legion appeared overhead in support of the Nationalists, Republican planes shot them down and took control of the skies. Until 13 February the Republican air force, largely composed of Soviet machines and pilots, maintained air supremacy. However, they were challenged by the arrival of more Italian and Spanish nationalist aircraft and a large scale dogfight was fought over Arganda, and they suffered heavy losses from German 88 mm guns while undertaking ground attack missions.

== Suicide Hill ==
The Nationalists brought their reserves forward and on 12 February opened a powerful attack in the direction of Morata. Asensio's troops took the Pingarrón hills and assaulted the Pajares heights to the north. This struggle for the high ground east of the Jarama would see some of the most bitter fighting of the battle. The Republican XI International Brigade and 17 Brigade defending the Pajares found itself outmanned and outgunned. Nationalist artillery massed on the heights of Pingarrón and pummeled the defenders, but they managed to hold. Meanwhile, along the San Martin–Morata Road, the newly formed XV International Brigade, consisting of a British Battalion, the Balkan Dimitrov Battalion and the Irish, and the Franco-Belgian Sixth of February Battalion, had been hurriedly put into the line to help stem the tide of the Saenz de Buruaga's brigade. Heavy fighting followed and the Nationalist advance was blunted.

A furious and confused fight followed in which the British Battalion lost poet Christopher Caudwell and 375 of their 600 men, including almost every officer, including the battalion commissar and Captain Tom Wintringham, in gaining and then holding and finally retreating from a position they named "Suicide Hill". On their right, though, the Franco-Belgians were forced to withdraw suddenly and in the ensuing confusion the British Battalion's machine-gun company was captured. To their right, the Dimitrov Battalion fought a desperate defensive action alongside the neighbouring German Thälmann Battalion, which held off a frontal assault on their hill-top, inflicting severe casualties on the attacking regulares with machine gun fire. The rapid withdrawal of the Franco-Belgian battalion meant that Suicide Hill had to be abandoned, but the delay caused by XV International Brigade had slowed the Nationalist advance, masking the weakness of the Republican line.

Nevertheless, the situation for the Republicans remained desperate. Fighting continued throughout 13 February as Varela's forces kept pressing hard, concentrating their efforts to the south of "Suicide Hill" in the low hills between the heights of Pajares and Pingarrón, in the centre of the Nationalist drive. After several attacks, eventually the Edgar Andre Battalion was forced to withdraw under the weight of a strong artillery barrage from Nationalist 155 mm guns firing from Marañosa Hill and fire from a supporting Condor Legion heavy machine gun battalion. Exploiting the resultant gap, Barrón's troops almost reached the town of Arganda del Rey and the coveted Madrid–Valencia road, but elsewhere the Nationalists were not able to capitalise on the success as the advance had ground to a halt, and as a result Varela ordered Barron to halt his advance as he was concerned that they would be cut off if they advanced too far ahead of other Nationalist units.

== Republican counterattack ==
After Jarama, the Americans were heard to remark: "Small wonder our unit was named after Abraham Lincoln: He, too, was assassinated."

On 14 February the Republicans counter-attacked Barrón's men with fifty T-26 tanks, supported by infantry, artillery and air cover. Although it did not re-take any lost ground, the counter-attack again bloodied the Nationalists and halted their advance. The shaken Nationalists went as far as to call the 14th "el día triste del Jarama" ("the sad day," a throwback to Hernán Cortés' Noche Triste).

On 17 February General José Miaja took overall command of the Republican front. Command had previously been split between him and General Pozas, hampering the co-ordination of Republican strategy. Miaja mounted a major counter-offensive to clear the eastern bank of the Jarama. Forces under Líster made a frontal assault on the heights at Pingarrón, only to be driven back with up to 50% casualties. On the tactical execution of these counterattacks, one Nationalist soldier reflected:

We only just held on to the position after two days of fighting. It was partly the courage of the Requetés that saved us, partly the arrival at a critical moment of a squadron of our tanks, but chiefly the inept and suicidal tactics of the enemy. They put in a frontal assault in broad daylight across a plain dominated by our positions and almost devoid of cover. ...They were Spanish troops and I greatly admired their bravery, but I wondered what kind of military cretin had ordered such an attack.

Another futile and costly attack was made by troops under Juan Modesto from the direction of the Manzanares river to the north on the Nationalist hill-top position at Marronosa. Here again, the Republicans failed, at a heavy cost, to achieve their objectives. In the northern sector however, the Nationalists were forced back, away from Vaciamadrid and the Madrid–Valencia road.

Further Republican counter-attacks followed between 23 and 27 February. General Gal ordered another attempt to storm the Nationalist strongpoint at Pingarrón. The Republican forces involved included 450 Americans of the Abraham Lincoln Brigade under Robert Merriman. The inexperienced troops, advancing without artillery or air support, marched towards the Nationalist lines and were gunned down. Poet Charles Donnelly (part of an Irish contingent known as the Connolly Column) was heard to remark, "even the olives are bleeding", before being gunned down by a burst of machine gun fire and killed. Captain Merriman was among those wounded. The Americans lost 120 dead and 175 wounded, or 66% casualties. The heavy casualties caused many of the demoralized Republicans to mutiny. Other Republican units put down the mutineers and brought them to a cave for a court-martial, but before a sentence could be decided on, Pavlov, the Soviet tank commander, stopped the trial.

== Aftermath ==
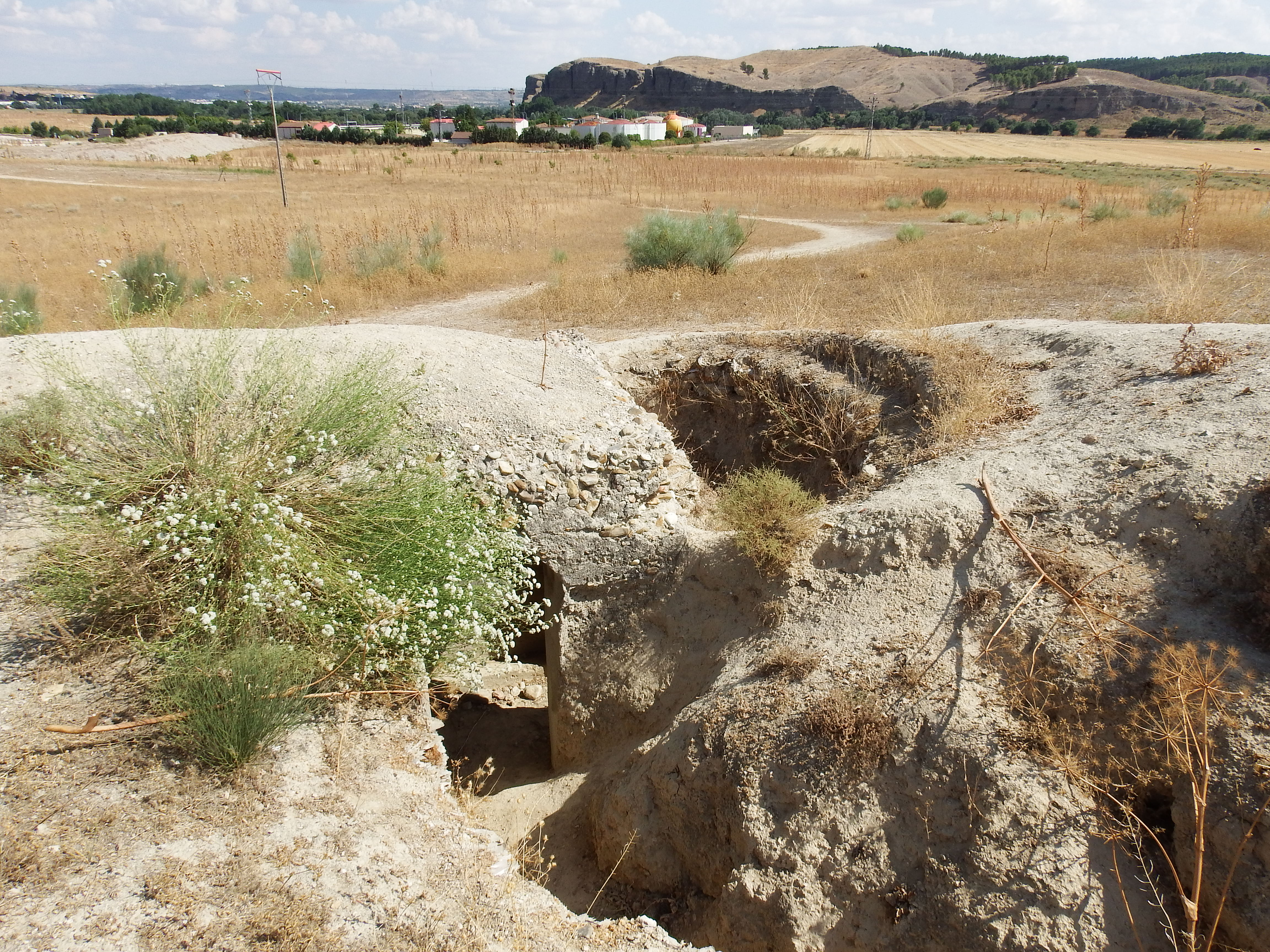
Republican trenches in Rivas-Vaciamadrid. The hill in front was in Nationalist hands. Madrid-Valencia road cannot be seen but is to the left of the picture.

By the end of February the front lines had stabilized, with both sides consolidating and fortifying their positions to the point where no useful assault could be undertaken. Nationalists and Republicans alike had suffered very heavy losses (of between 6,000 and 25,000 each, depending on different estimates). In addition, their troops were exhausted and low on ammunition and food. Although the Nationalists succeeded in crossing the river and resisted all efforts to dislodge them from their footholds on the other side, the Madrid–Valencia road remained out of reach and firmly in Republican hands. Consequently, the area lost much of its strategic importance and merged into the wider front, lined with trenches and reminiscent of the static struggle of the Western Front during the First World War. In March, the Italian Expeditionary Army was likewise thrown back at Guadalajara, ending Franco's hopes of cutting off Madrid.

== See also ==
- Carolina Bunjes
- Jarama Valley (song)
- "Yank" Levy
- List of Spanish Republican military equipment of the Spanish Civil War
- List of Spanish Nationalist military equipment of the Spanish Civil War
