= Hugo Stoltzenberg =

German chemist (1883–1974)

Hugo Gustav Adolf Stoltzenberg (27 April 1883 – 14 January 1974) was a German chemist associated with the German government's clandestine chemical warfare activities in the early 1920s.

Stoltzenberg was a close collaborator of Nobel Prize laureate Fritz Haber, the father of German chemical warfare. They both collaborated in the disposal of chemical warfare materials and the building of manufacturing plants in La Marañosa, near Madrid, Spain, the Soviet Union and Germany.

== Early life ==
Stoltzenberg was born on 27 April 1883 in Strengen near Landeck, Tyrol. His father, Karl Theodor Stoltzenberg (1854–1893), was an engineer. Stoltzenberg attended school in Vienna, Leipzig and East Cambridge, and completed his Abitur in 1904 in Frankfurt-on-the-Oder. He studied law, then mathematics, and finally chemistry in Halle from 1905 to 1907. In 1907, he went to Gießen for a year. He returned to Halle and was an assistant to Daniel Vorländer until 1910. In 1911, he became an assistant to Heinrich Biltz in Breslau and met the chemist Margarete Bergius, a sister of Friedrich Bergius, whom he married in 1915.

== World War I ==
Stoltzenberg was the main protagonist at the Second Battle of Ypres (22 April to 25 May 1915) in Belgium where the Germans used poison gas for the first time on the Western Front. The first gas attack occurred against Canadian soldiers and also against a force of mostly colonial soldiers from French Africa known as French colonial troops. The gas used was Chlorine gas. Mustard gas, also called Yperite from the name of this city, was also used for the first time near Ypres in the autumn of 1917.

Prior to that, Stoltzenberg had injured his eye in an incident involving a chlorine gas cylinder which exploded and blinded him in the left eye.

== Interwar years ==
After the end of World War I, Stoltzenberg participated in clearing away the stockpiles of the chemical warfare agents in Lüneburg Heath in Lower Saxony, Germany between 1920 and 1925. Many of those agents were sold to the U.S. and Sweden while the rest were taken to "Chemische Fabrik Stoltzenberg", his own company in Hamburg.

== Involvement in the Rif War ==
Stoltzenberg built a close relationship with the Spanish government. He signed a contract to fully assist the establishment of the La Marañosa plant "Fábrica Nacional de Productos Químicos" (National factory of chemical products) which served the Spanish army with chemical warfare agents (including mustard gas bombs) used against the Riffian rebels in Spanish Morocco during the Third Rif War between 1923 and 1927. He later became a Spanish citizen while being the chief engineer of the plant.

== Other contracts ==
In 1923, he signed his second contract. The Soviets wanted to modernize their chemical arsenal and asked Stoltzenberg to become a chief engineer in replacing the chlorine gas plant at Saratov with a modern mustard gas plant. He quit his collaboration efforts around 1928, heading to work at Ravinica plant in Yugoslavia before working in Brazil between 1937 and 1942.

Upon his return to Germany he set up a new laboratory producing “timed-release hydrogen cyanide,” which was patented in Great Britain.

== Later years ==
Stoltzenberg joined the Nazi Party in the middle of World War II. He continued his research at his laboratory in Hamburg before selling it in 1969. He died in 1974.
