= Rudibert Kunz =

German journalist

Rudibert Kunz (born 1943) is a German investigator, journalist and television editor.

Kunz is known for being the first journalist to write about the use Chemical weapons in the Rif War. Since 1979, he has been researching the history of weapons of mass destruction. He also wrote about the strategy of Saddam Hussein in the Gulf War 1991 and about the role of the ABC weapons of Adolf Hitler.

He is a holder of a Master in literature and sociology.

== Bibliography ==
- Rolf-Dieter Müller (1990). Giftgas gegen Abd El Krim: Deutschland, Spanien und der Gaskrieg in Spanisch-Marokko, 1922–1927 (in German). Rombach. ISBN 3-7930-0196-2.
