= Sebastián Pozas Perea =

Spanish military officer

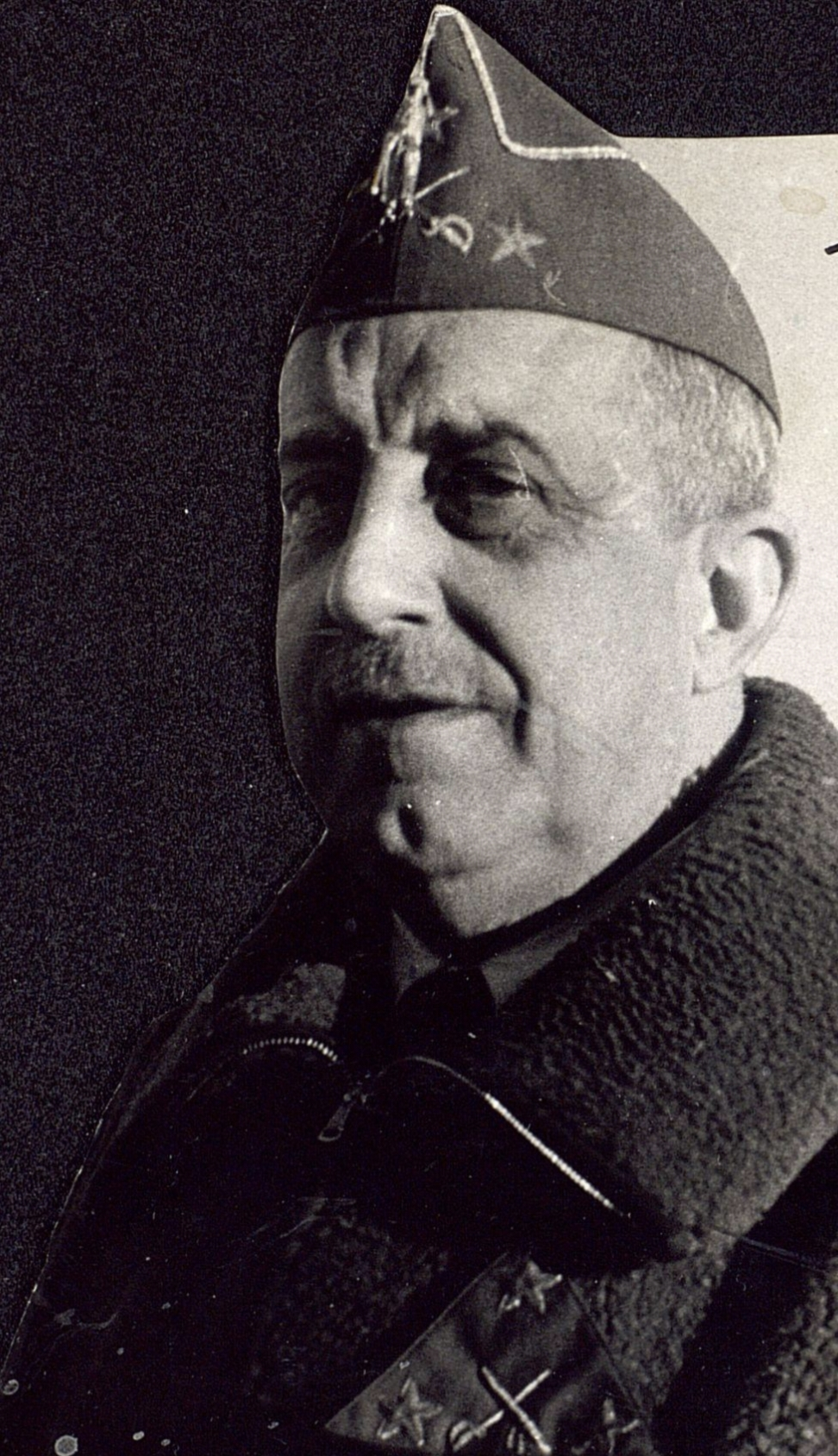
- Pozas Parea in 1937
- Born: Sebastián Pozas Perea; 22 January 1876; Zaragoza, Spain
- Died: 1946 (aged 69–70); Mexico City, Mexico
- Military career
- Allegiance: (Second Spanish Republic) Spanish Republic
- Branch: Army
- Service years: 1892–1939
- Rank: General
- Commands: Minister of Interior (1936), Commander of Army of the Centre (1936-1937), Commander of Army of the East(1937-1938).
- Conflicts: Rif War; Spanish Civil War: Battle of Jarama; Battle of Guadalajara; Huesca Offensive; Battle of Belchite

Sebastián Pozas Perea (Zaragoza, 1876 – 1946) was a Spanish military officer and civil servant.

== Early life ==
Trained in the cavalry, Pozas undertook extended service in Spanish Morocco, fighting in the Rif Wars and attaining the rank of general in 1926, by order of the Miguel Primo de Rivera government. In the 1930s, Pozas served the Republic as Director General of the Guardia Civil.

== Spanish Civil War ==
When the Nationalists rose against the government on June 18, 1936, leading to the Spanish Civil War, Pozas remained loyal and rallied large numbers of police and paramilitary units to the Republic. In the opening days of war he reorganized the loyal elements of the Guardia Civil into the Guardia Nacional Republicana.

Pozas briefly served as Minister of the Interior before being put in command of the Army of the Center, in October 1936. Nearly overwhelmed along the Jarama in February 1937, the Army of the Centre ultimately flung back the Nationalist pincers closing around Madrid after a bloody campaign culminating in the Battle of Guadalajara. In May Pozas, who has been appointed commander of the Army of the East, led a costly attack toward Huesca that cost the Republic 10,000 casualties. Pozas led the Republican Army of the East at Belchite and Teruel. It is said that during the war he also joined the PSUC, though pro-Soviet sources reject this claim.

== Exile and death ==
In 1939, with the Republic defeated, Pozas journeyed to exile in Mexico, where he died in 1946.

== Sources ==
- Thomas, Hugh (2001). The Spanish Civil War. Modern Library. ISBN 0-375-75515-2.
