= Strengen =

Municipality in Tyrol, Austria

- Municipality
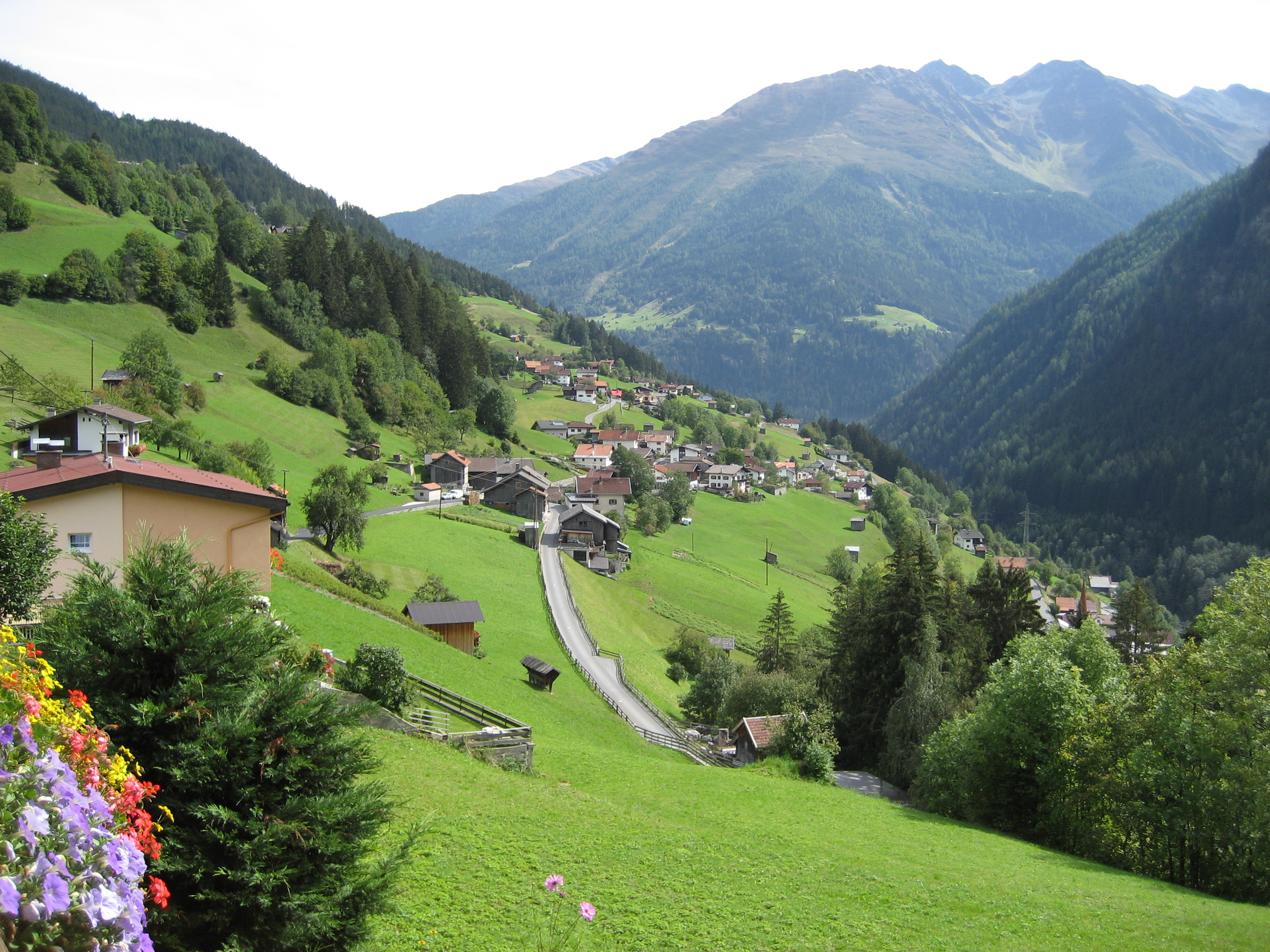
- View of Strengen

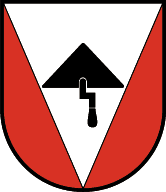
- Coat of arms

- Location within Austria
- Coordinates: 47°08′00″N 10°27′00″E
- Country: Austria
- State: Tyrol
- District: Landeck

Government
  - Mayor: Harald Sieß

Area
  - Total: 23.18 km^{2} (8.95 sq mi)
- Elevation: 1,012 m (3,320 ft)

Population (2018-01-01)
  - Total: 1,213
  - Density: 52.33/km^{2} (135.5/sq mi)
- Time zone: UTC+1 (CET)
  - Summer (DST): UTC+2 (CEST)
- Postal code: 6571
- Area code: 05447
- Vehicle registration: LA
- Website: www.strengen.at

Strengen is a municipality in the district of Landeck in the Austrian state of Tyrol located 7.7 km west of the city of Landeck. The village was first mentioned in an atlas in 1774 as "Gstreng". The main source of income is tourism.

== People ==
- Hugo Stoltzenberg, chemist
- Barbara Zangerl, climber
