= Sebastian Balfour =

British historian (born 1941)

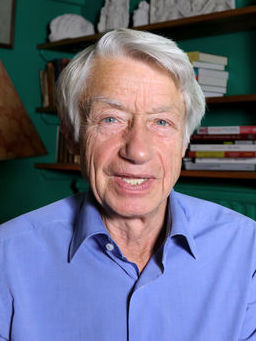
- Sebastian Balfour in 2017
- Born: 1941 (age 84–85)
- Occupations: Historian and hispanist

Sebastian Balfour (born in 1941) is an English historian and Professor Emeritus of Contemporary Spanish Studies at the London School of Economics.

== Works ==
=== Author ===
Books

- Castro. Profiles in power. London and New York: Longman. 1990. (Note: First edition in 1990. Re-edited in 1995 and 2008)
- La dictadura, los trabajadores y la ciudad. El movimiento obrero en el área metropolitana de Barcelona (1939-1988). Valencia: Edicions Alfons El Magnànim. 1994.
- The End of the Spanish Empire 1898-1923. Clarendon Press. 1997.
- Deadly Embrace. Morocco and The Road to The Spanish Civil War. Oxford University Press. 2002. (Note: Published by Peninsula in Spanish as Abrazo mortal. De la Guerra Colonial a La Guerra Civil. España y Marruecos (1909-1939))

Chapters in collective works

- "Nuevas y viejas interpretaciones del 98 y de sus consecuencias en España". XIII Coloquio de Historia Canario-Americana. VIII Congreso Internacional de Historia de América (AEA). Casa de Colón. 1998. pp. 35–42.
- "El 98 y El Nacionalismo Español". Imágenes del 98 (in Spanish). Fundación BBV. 1999.
- J. Álvarez-Junco, J. & Adrian Shubert, ed. (1999). "The Desarrollo years, 1955-1975". In A History of Spain since 1808. A. Macmillan. pp. 277–288.
- Ismael Saz & Edward Acton, ed. (2001). "War, Nationalism and the Masses in Spain, 1898-1939". La transición a la política de masas : V Seminario Histórico Hispano-Británico. Universitat de València. pp. 75–92. ISBN 84-370-5148-7.
- Angel Smith & Emma Dávila-Cox, ed. (1999). "The Impact of the War Within Spain: Continuity or Crisis?". The Crisis of 1898. Colonial Redistribution and Nationalist Mobilization. pp. 180–194.

Articles in academic journals

- Balfour, Sebastian (2001). "Secret Wars in Forgotten Africa". Journal of Romance Studies. 1 (3): 121–132. doi:10.3828/jrs.1.3.121.
- Balfour, Sebastian (2008). "The concept of historical revisionism: Spain since the 1930s". International Journal of Iberian Studies. 21 (3): 179–186. doi:10.1386/ijis.21.3.179_1.

=== Co-author ===
- Balfour, Sebastian; Quiroga, Alejandro (2007). España reinventada. Nación e identidad desde la transición. Barcelona: Península.

=== Editor ===
- Sebastian Balfour, ed. (2005). The Politics of Contemporary Spain. Routledge.
- Sebastian Balfour & Paul Preston, ed. (1999). Spain and the Great Powers in the Twentieth Century. Routledge. (Note: Also re-published as España y las grandes potencias y los efectos del Desastre de 1898. Preston, P. Critica. 2002. and España y las grandes potencias en el siglo XX. Critica. 2002.)
- Sebastian Balfour; Laurie Howes; Michael de Larrabeiti; Anthony Weale, eds. (2008). Trinity Tales: Tales from Trinity College Dublin in Sixties. Lilliput Press.

== Links ==
- Professor Sebastian Balfour - Sebastian Balfour official website
- Professor Sebastian Balfour - London School of Economics
