= La Marañosa =

Locality of Madrid, Spain

Coordinates: 40°16′N 3°35′W

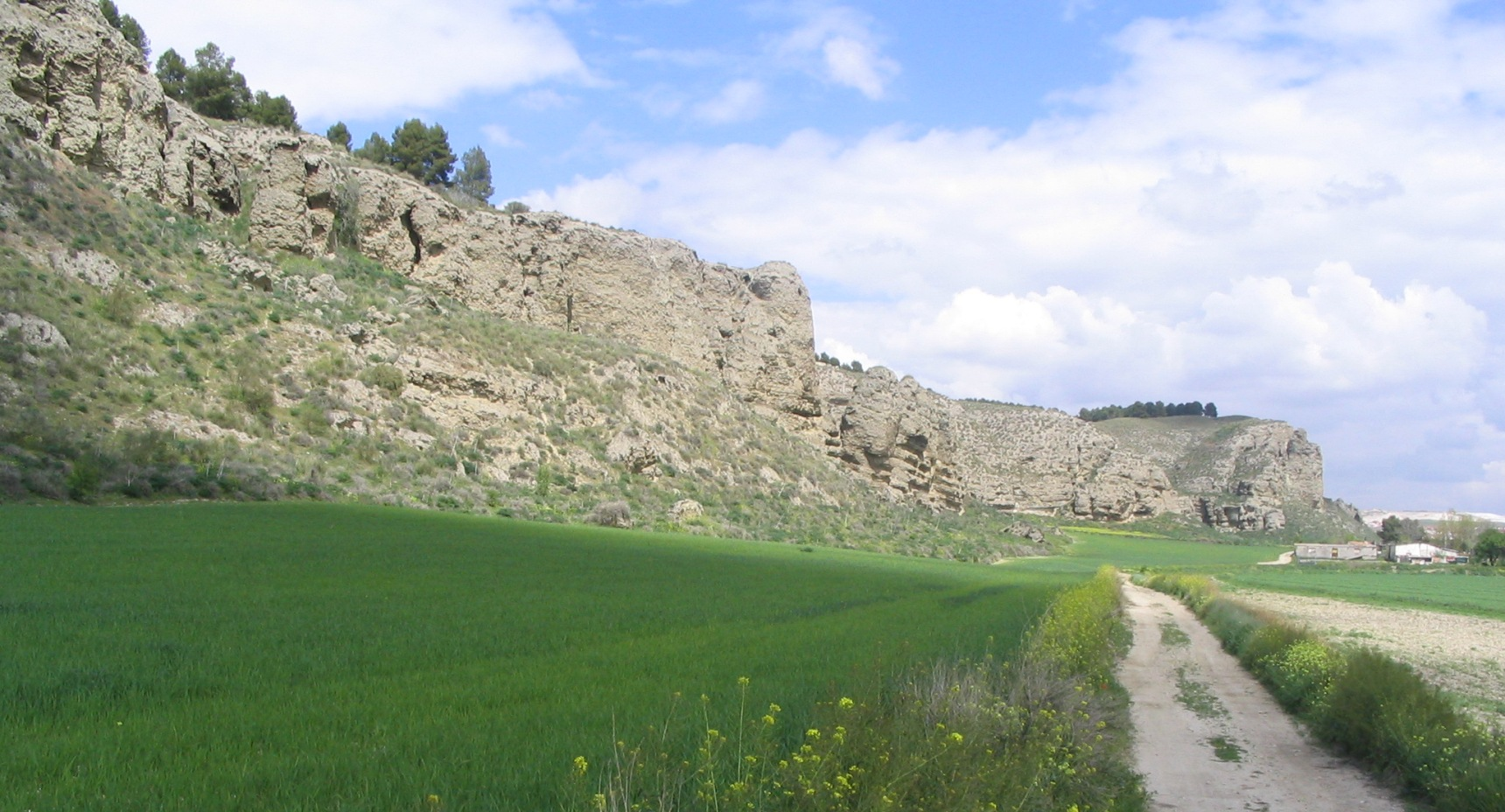
La Marañosa

La Marañosa is a locality of Madrid, Spain. Its hills (700 metres high) overlook both banks of the Jarama river.

The locality is known for being home of The "Fábrica Nacional de Productos Químicos" (National factory of chemical products) which supplied the Spanish Army of Africa with chemical warfare agents during the Rif rebellion between 1923 and 1927.

On February 5, 1937 and during the Spanish Civil War, the locality was the scene of the Battle of Jarama. The Nationalist offensive began with assaults on the Republican positions on the west bank of the Jarama. The opening attacks took the Republicans by surprise. The Nationalists, as was the fashion of the Army of Africa, advanced in mobile columns and overwhelmed the unprepared Republicans. General García Escámez commanded their right flank (to the south), General Rada commanded the left, or northern wing, while General Asensio commanded the centre. Escámez on February 6 appeared at Ciempozuelos and overran the XVIII Brigade, which lost 1,800 men. Rada's men took La Marañosa hill, 700 metres high, which overlooked both banks of the Jarama. The two Republican battalions atop La Marañosa vainly stuck to their cliff-top defenses and died there to the last. From this hill top position, the Nationalists could dominate the river crossing with artillery and machine gun fire.

== Books ==
- Hugh Thomas (2001). The Spanish Civil War. Modern Library. ISBN 0-375-75515-2.
