= Voldemar Oinonen =

Finnish military commander

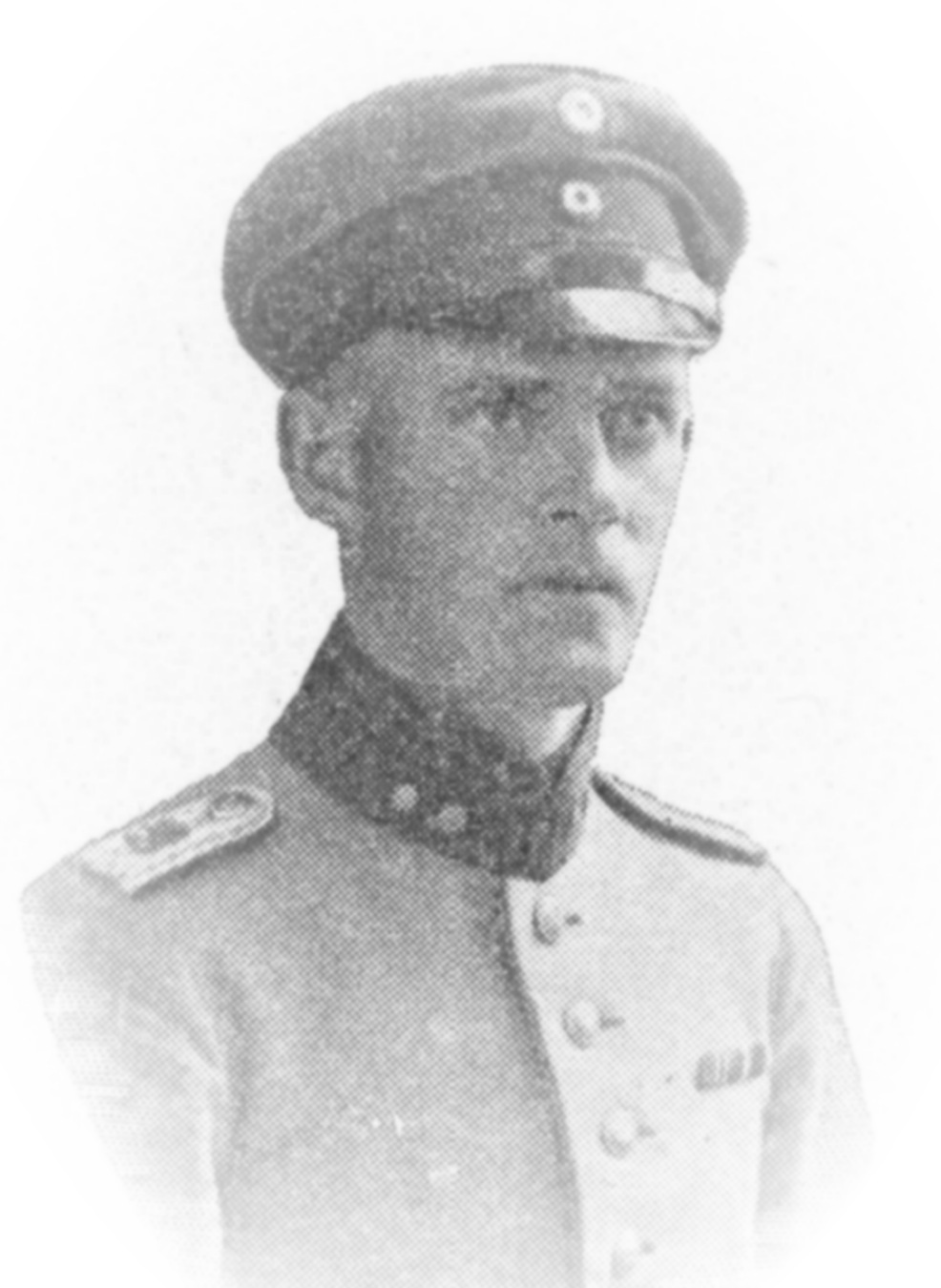

Voldemar Oinonen (1891–1963) was a Finnish military commander.

== Ranks ==
- 1939–1940 Assistant Chief General Staff
- 1940 General Officer Commanding 23rd Division
- 1940 General Officer Commanding 11th Separate Division
- 1940–1941 Acting General Officer Commanding III Corps
- 1941–1942 General Officer Commanding Group Oinonen
- 1942–1944 Chief of Staff of the Home Troops
- 1944 Acting Commander in Chief of the Home Troops
