= Journal of Romance Studies =

- Discipline: Romance studies
- Language: English
- Edited by: Catherine Davies, Joseph Ford

Publication details
- Publisher: Liverpool University Press

Standard abbreviations
- ISO 4: J. Roman. Stud.

Indexing
- ISSN: 1473-3536 (print); 1752-2331 (web)

The Journal of Romance Studies is a peer-reviewed academic journal of romance studies published by Liverpool University Press in association with the Institute of Modern Languages Research. One themed issue and two open issues are published each year. The journal is edited by Catherine Davies (Institute of Modern Languages Research) and Joseph Ford (Institute of Modern Languages Research).

== Abstracting and indexing ==
Journal of Romance Studies is indexed and abstracted in:

  - A Current Bibliography on African Affairs (Sage)
  - Emerging Sources Citation Index (Thomson Reuters)
  - Historical Abstracts (EBSCO)
  - IBR – International Bibliography of Book Reviews of Scholarly Literature on the Humanities and Social Sciences (De Gruyter)
  - IBZ – International Bibliography of Periodical Literature in the Humanities and Social Sciences (De Gruyter)
  - MLA Directory of Periodicals
  - MLA International Bibliography
  - Periodicals Index Online (Chadwyck-Healey)
  - Scopus (Elsevier)
