= British Battalion =

Shapurji Saklatvala Battalion British Battalion
- Active: January 1937 – October 1938
- Country: United Kingdom
- Allegiance: Republican Spain
- Branch: International Brigades
- Type: Battalion – Infantry
- Size: One battalion
- Part of: XV International Brigade
- Garrison/HQ: Madrigueras
- Nicknames: Batallón Británico, Batallón inglés
- Patron: Shapurji Saklatvala
- Engagements: Spanish Civil War: Battle of Jarama; Battle of Brunete; Battle of Teruel; Battle of the Ebro

The British Battalion (1936–1938; officially the Saklatvala Battalion) was the 16th (from November 1937 the 57th) battalion of the XV International Brigade, one of the mixed brigades of the International Brigades, during the Spanish Civil War. It comprised British, Irish and Dominion volunteers.

== History ==
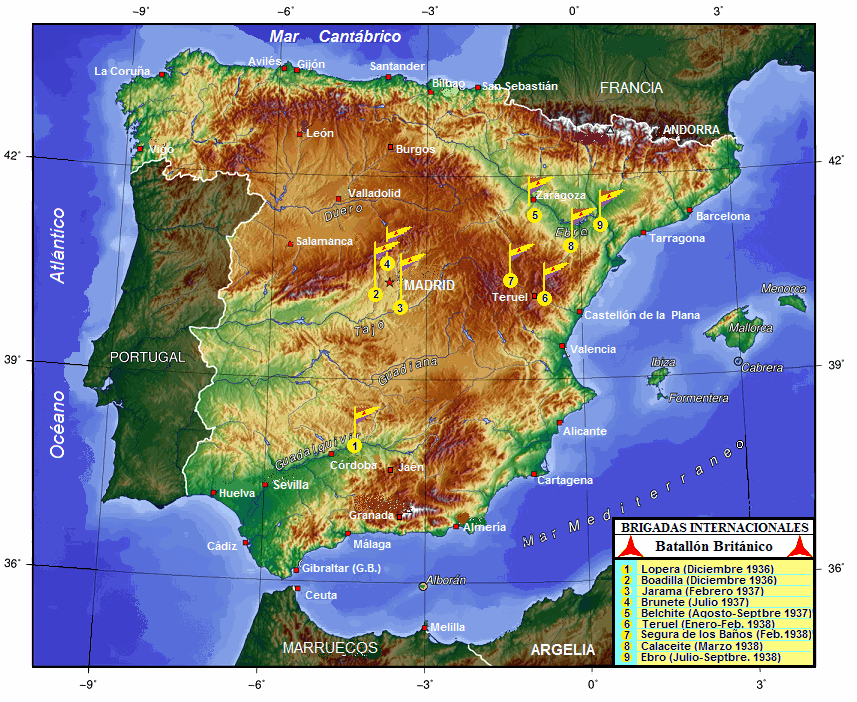
Map showing British Battalion engagements

=== Early volunteers ===
A number of British volunteers, including Tom Wintringham, David Marshall, Ramona and Nat Cohen, and Scots nurse Annie Murray, arrived in Spain during August–September 1936. The men formed the Tom Mann Centuria, and in July/August they had been part of an attempt to liberate Mallorca. Later they were joined by Bill Scott, becoming a rifle company in the German-speaking Thälmann Column. The Thälmann Battalion later formed part of XII International Brigade and fought in the Siege of Madrid, including the Battle of Ciudad Universitaria.

Another group of British volunteers – among them Jock Cunningham and John Cornford – fought with the French-speaking Commune de Paris Battalion, in the XI International Brigade. It also fought in the Siege of Madrid, including the battles for University City and Casa de Campo.

In December 1936, 145 British volunteers formed No. 1 Company of the French-speaking Marseillaise Battalion, part of the XIV International Brigade. They fought on the Córdoba front during December, and on the Madrid front during January 1937. Heavy fighting on 15 January at Las Rozas reduced the active ranks to 67.

=== Formation ===
In January 1937, the survivors of No.1 Company joined with 450 new British, Irish, and Dominion volunteers at Madrigueras, near Albacete, International Brigades headquarters. They were formed into an English-speaking battalion, with three infantry companies (Nos. 1, 3, 4) and a machine-gun company (no. 2). Its initial commanding officer was Wilfred Macartney, a former British Army officer who had served both in the Black & Tans and Spanish Foreign Legion, and then been sentenced to 10 years in HMP Parkhurst for spying for Russia. Canadian Bert "Yank" Levy served as an officer in No.2 company of the Saklatvala Battalion, under Wintringham from 1937. He was captured at the Battle of Jarama and spent six months in a Francoist jail until he was released in a prisoner exchange.

The battalion was numbered the 16th battalion of the International Brigades. It was formally named after Shapurji Saklatvala, the former Communist Member of Parliament (MP) for Battersea. However, this name never caught on and it was normally known as the "British Battalion". The Spanish also referred to it as "el batallón británico" or "el batallón inglés". Number 1 company was later called the Major Attlee Company after the leader of the British Labour Party, who visited the British volunteers in December 1937.

The British Battalion was attached to XV International Brigade, XV IB. The other battalions were the US Lincoln Battalion, the crack Balkan Dimitrov Battalion, and the Franco-Belgian Sixth February Battalion. In early February 1937 Macartney was recalled to the UK by his parole board. En route to the railway station at Albacete he was accidentally shot in the arm by the battalion commissar, necessitating transfer of command to Tom Wintringham.

=== Jarama, 1937 ===
In February 1937, the battalion fought at the Battle of Jarama. In a single day's bloody fighting on 12 February against Moors of the 7th Tabor of Melilla, part of the 8th Regiment of Francisco Franco's Army of Africa, the British Battalion suffered 275 casualties in No.1, No.3, and No.4 companies – leaving 125 riflemen fit for duty. On the second day of fighting, the machine gun company was surrounded by Spanish Nationalist troops and many of its members were captured. Battalion commander Tom Wintringham was wounded, and Jock Cunningham took command of the battalion's 140 survivors. On the third day of the battle the battalion was temporarily routed, but under the leadership of Cunningham and brigade commissar Frank Ryan, staged a counter-attack, singing the Internationale, in what would become known as the “Great Rally”. The battalion remained in the trenches at Jarama until 17 June 1937.

=== Brunete, 1937 ===
Reinforced by new recruits and strengthened by returnees from hospital, the British Battalion mustered 331 brigaders at the Battle of Brunete. On 6 July, XV IB occupied the villages of Romanillos and Boadilla del Monte, and by midnight captured the village of Villanueva de la Cañada. (It was here that Alex McDade who wrote the song, Valley of Jarama, commonly heard at Brigade meetings, was killed in action.) The following day the British were ordered to advance on Mosquito Ridge, a piece of high ground which overlooked the battalion's original objectives. As they left Villanueva de la Cañada they were bombed by Junkers aircraft from the Condor Legion and shelled by Nationalist artillery. The two-hour barrage and devastating heat caused heavy casualties and prevented the battalion reaching Mosquito Ridge before Franco's army rushed reinforcements to defend the position. Only 42 members of the battalion were left fit for service, and the battalion was withdrawn into a reserve position.

=== Aragon, 1937 ===
In mid-August, the Republican 35th Division, which included XV IB, was moved to Aragon. The focus of the Aragon campaign was to draw-off Nationalist attacks on Santander and to capture the strategic city of Zaragoza. On 25 August the battalion took part in street fighting to capture the Nationalist strongpoint at Quinto, where Wintringham, now head of the Officer's School and attached to the American Lincoln and Canadian MacKenzie/Papineau battalions, was shot again, this time badly and injured out of the war. On 25 August the battalion attacked a strong Francoist position at Purburrel Hill, and was repelled by intense rifle and machine gun fire. The following day another assault was made on the hill, supported by the XVth Brigade antitank artillery battery, and this time the attack succeeded. Heavy fighting had reduced the battalion to 100 men, and a number of Spanish Republican troops were drafted as reinforcements for the battalion.

=== Disbandment ===
On 21 September 1938, Juan Negrín announced to the League of Nations that the Republican government would disband the International Brigades. The British battalion was withdrawn into reserve at the end of September 1938, and on 17 October, the battalion took part in the International Brigades' farewell parade through Barcelona. President Azaña and Prime Minister Negrín joined the crowds who took part in one of the last great Republican celebrations. On disbandment, 305 British volunteers left Spain. They arrived at Victoria Station on 7 December, to be met by a crowd of supporters including Clement Attlee, Stafford Cripps, Willie Gallacher, and Will Lawther.

== Composition ==
A 2024 study found that 49% of the members of the British Battalion were members of the Communist Party.

=== Welsh members ===
An estimated 300 people from Wales enlisted in the International Brigades, fighting Franco in Spain from 1936–39. Of the battalion’s 170 Welsh volunteers, 116 were miners, one in five was married and the average age was over 30. The South Wales miners provided the largest regional group in the British battalion.

=== Scottish members ===
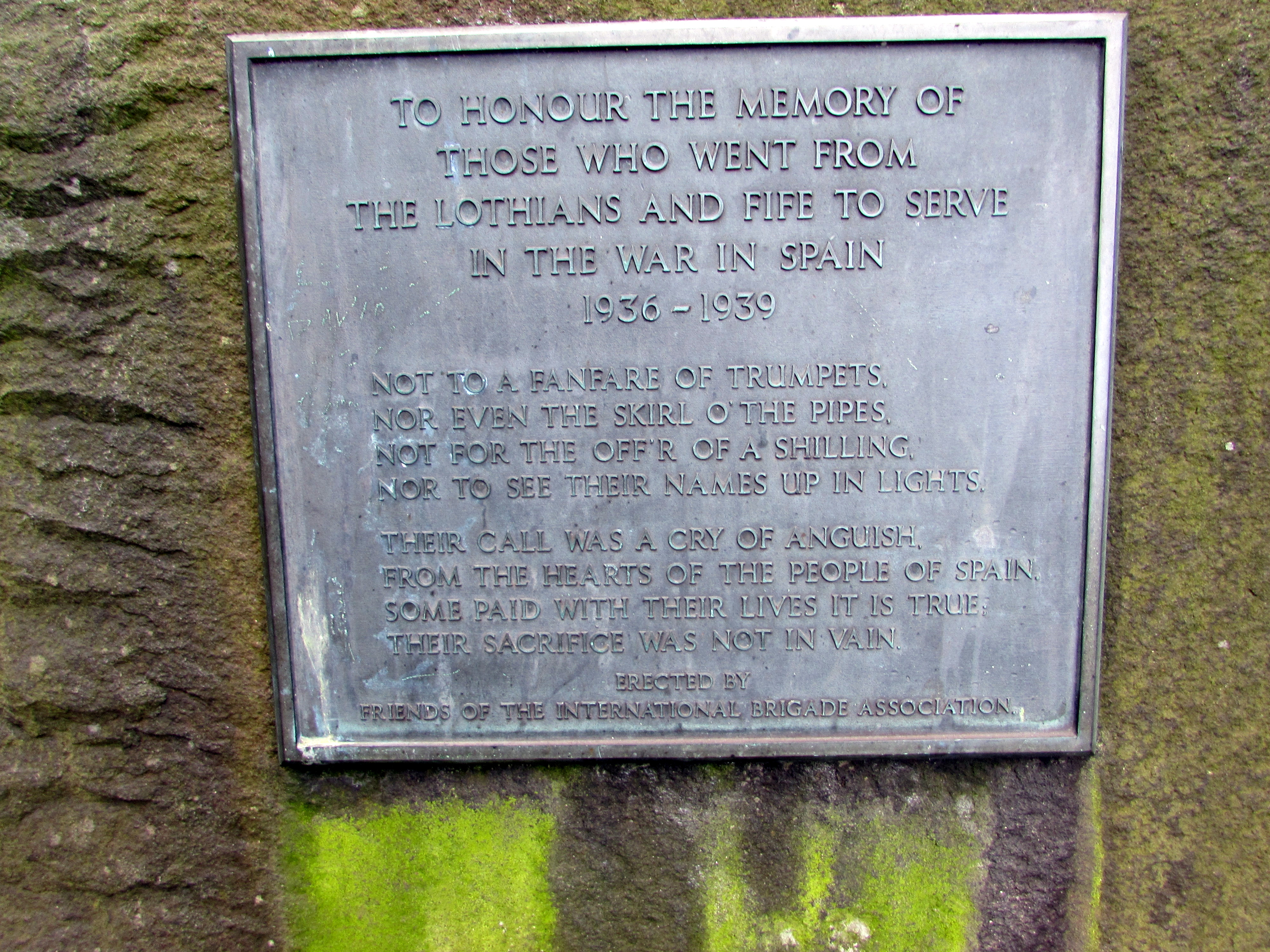
Spanish Civil War Memorial for Scottish volunteers, Princes Street Gardens Edinburgh

An estimated 500 volunteers went from Scotland to Spain to oppose fascism and support the Republican government there. A high proportion were working class members of the Communist party (which organised the mobilisation and transportation across France), many went in on foot over the Pyrenees. A Scottish Ambulance Unit was also sent to Spain; it dispensed food donations but mainly provided first aid and treatment of the wounded from the front.

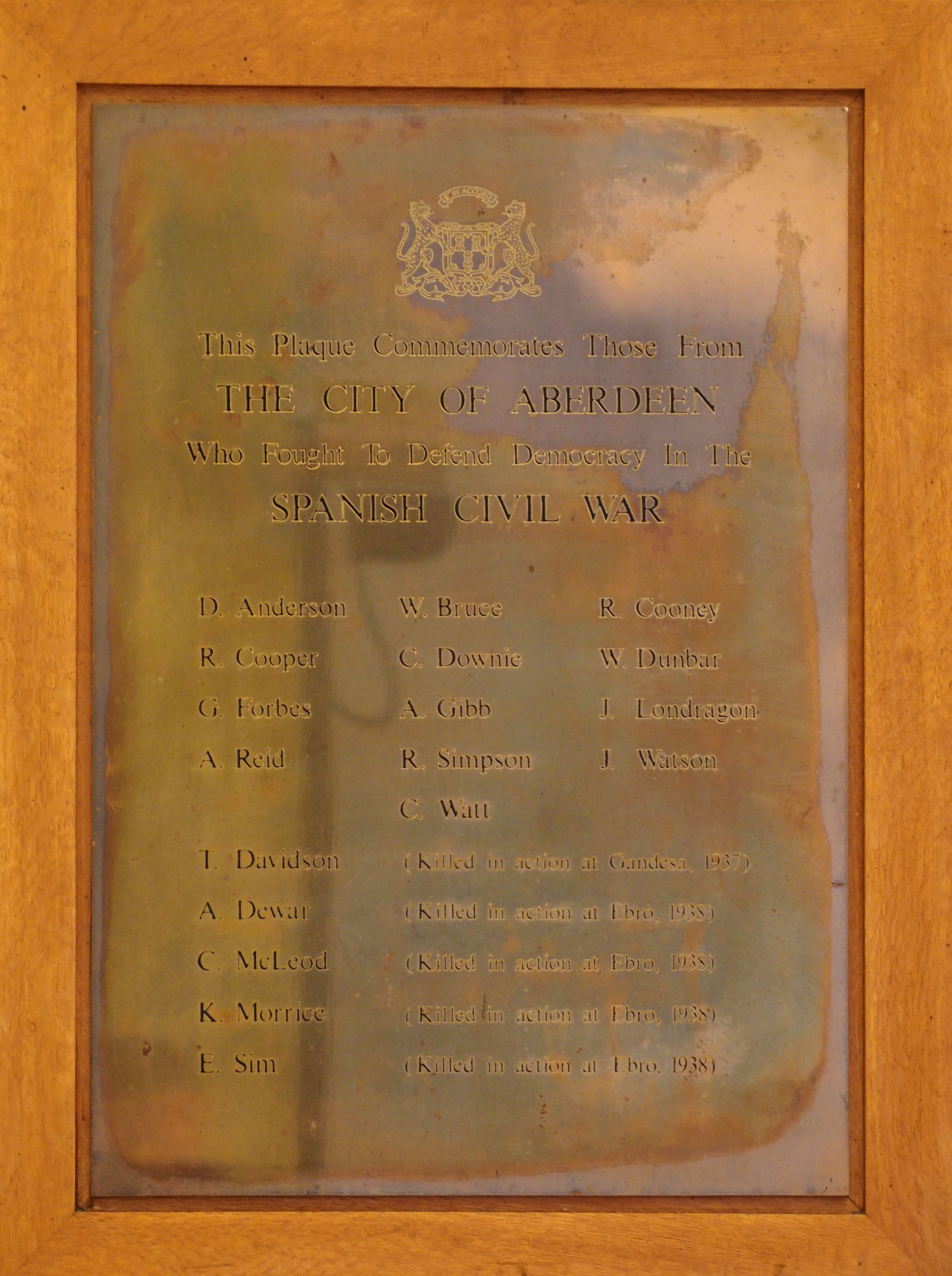
Aberdeen Memorial to local members of the XV Brigade

=== Irish members ===
The battalion contained a cadre of Irish volunteers who had previously been organized as the "James Connolly Company" (unofficially, the "Connolly Column"). A number of these men were unhappy in the British battalion due to their Irish Republican convictions. However their leader, Frank Ryan, wrote of the importance of workers solidarity outweighing national sentiment. As a result of these tensions, some of the Irish left the British to join the 17th (American) Lincoln Battalion, another part of the XV Brigade. Later, at the Battle of Belchite in 1937, Paddy O'Daire of the Connolly's took command of the British battalion following the wounding of the then CO, Peter Daly.

== International Brigade Memorial Trust ==
The International Brigade Memorial Trust has been established by veterans and historians to preserve and catalog the history of the British Battalion.

=== Roll of Honour ===
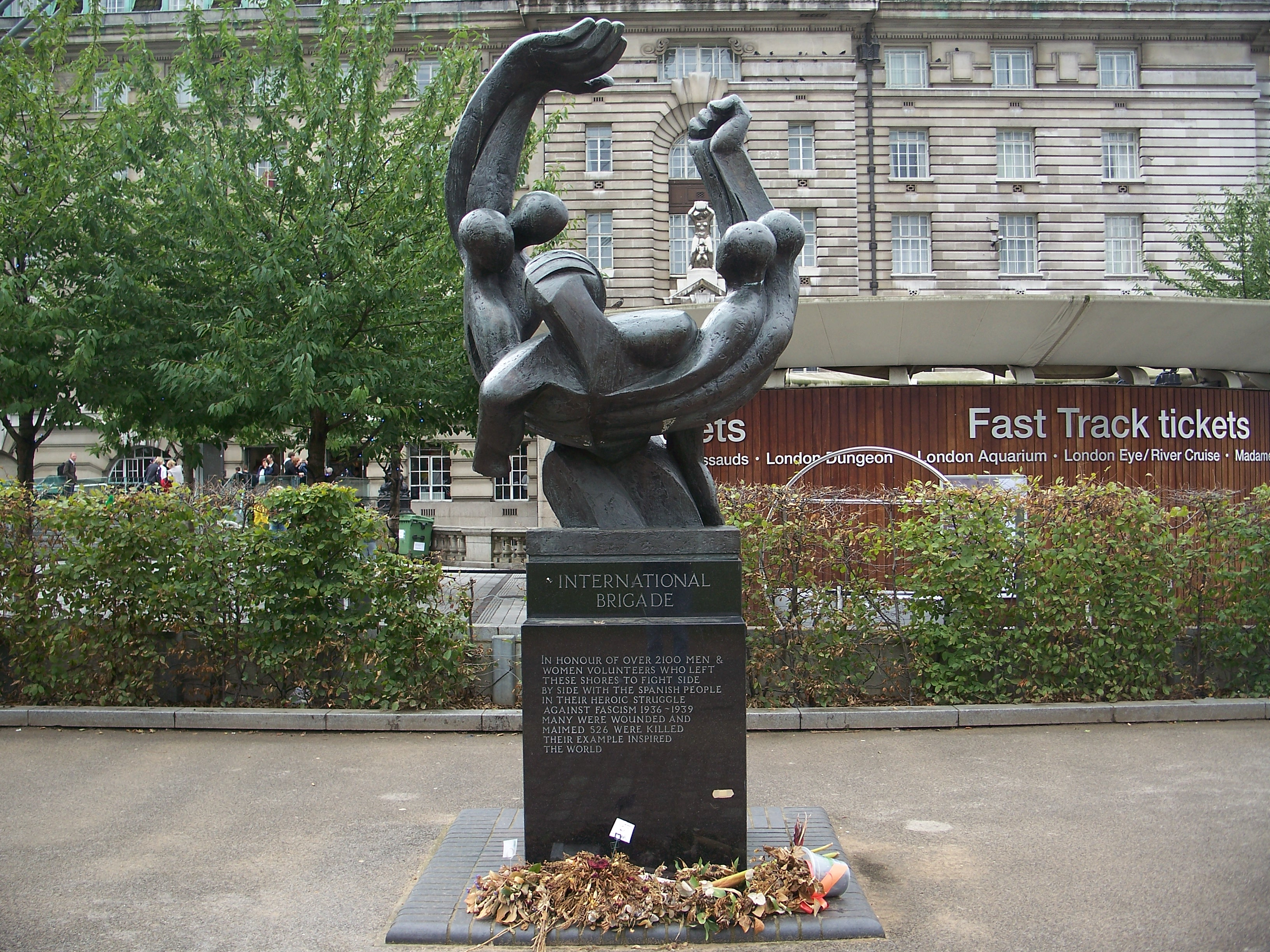
A memorial to the British volunteers in the International Brigades in Jubilee Gardens, Lambeth, London

The IBMT has compiled a roll of honour, listing the members of the British battalion who fell in Spain. The list is compiled primarily from documents held in the International Brigade Archive in the Marx Memorial Library, London and the International Brigade Archive in the Russian Centre for the Preservation and Study of Recent Historical Documents, Moscow.

=== Notable members ===
- Bill Alexander – industrial chemist, commander of the British Battalion from 1938, a Captain in the Reconnaissance Regiment in the Second World War and later Assistant General Secretary of the Communist Party of Great Britain.
- Christopher Caudwell – real name Christopher St. John Sprigg. Journalist, poet, killed in action at Jarama in February 1937.
- Lewis Clive – Olympic gold medallist for rowing.
- Fred Copeman – former sailor, organiser of the Invergordon Mutiny, commanded the British Battalion during 1937.
- Jason Gurney – British sculptor, also served with the Lincoln Battalion.
- Gopal Mukund Huddar – Indian anti-colonial activist.
- Jack Jones – later General Secretary of the Transport & General Workers Union.
- James Robertson Justice – British actor, famous for the Doctor series of films.
- Laurie Lee – poet, novelist, author of A Moment of War, which covers his experiences during the civil war in Spain.
- Bert "Yank" Levy who used his experience to teach the British Home Guard and wrote a text on guerrilla warfare
- Will Paynter – NUM General Secretary 1959 – 1968
- Alfred Sherman – Conservative philosopher, battalion Russian translator; taken prisoner in 1938.
- Wally Tapsell - political commissioner, killed in action in 1938.
- Tom Wintringham – journalist, author, commander of the British Battalion to 1937.

== See also ==
- Viva la Quinta Brigada – song by Christy Moore
- ILP Contingent
- International Brigades order of battle
