= Jason Gurney =

British sculptor

Jason Gurney (1910–1973) was a British sculptor who fought in the Spanish Civil War.

His family moved to South Africa when he was a child and after leaving school he worked in Johannesburg. Eventually, he saved enough money to return to Europe.

He was with the International Brigades from December 1936 to August 1937. During that time, he served in the British Battalion, the Lincoln Battalion and XIV International Brigade staff. He was wounded in the right hand by a sniper's explosive bullet in a lull between fighting in the trenches at Jarama. His wound was sufficiently serious to send him home and to ensure that he never worked as a sculptor again.

His perceptive and vivid memoirs of the Spanish Civil War were published posthumously and are drawn from heavily by historians. He knew and described Tom Wintringham Fred Copeman, André Marty, Martin Hourihan, Jock Cunningham, George Nathan, Vladimir Copic, Steve Nelson, and many others.

== Sources ==
- Jason Gurney, Crusade in Spain, Faber. 1974. ISBN 978-0-571-10310-2
