= Wally Tapsell =

Walter Thomas Leo Tapsell
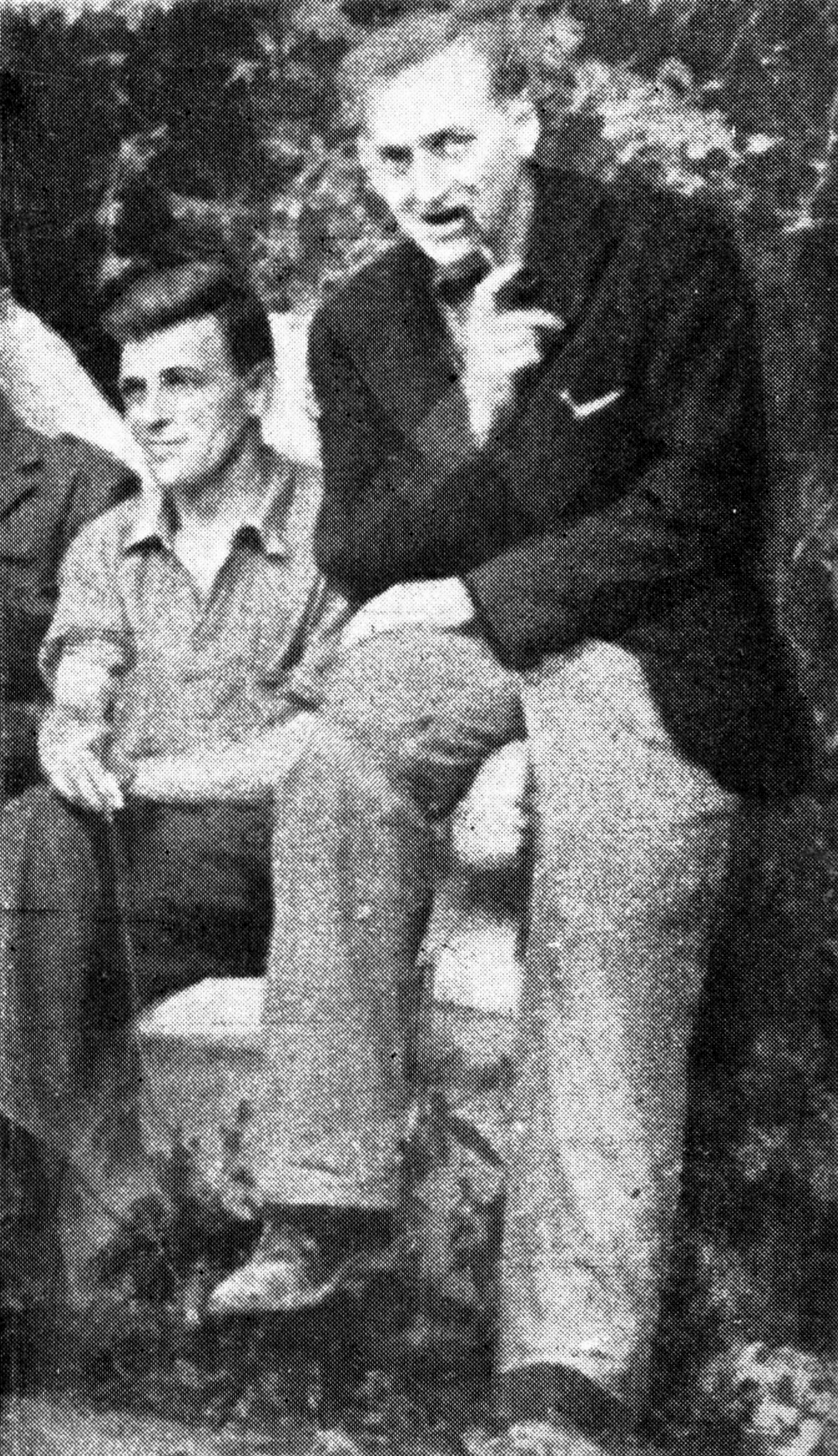
- Tapsell (right) with Will Paynter in Spain c. 1937
- Born: 19 August 1904; East End of London, England
- Died: 31 March 1938 (aged 33)
- Education: Lenin School in Moscow
- Occupation: Communist activist
- Spouse: Esther Tapsell

Walter Thomas Leo Tapsell (19 August 1904 – 31 March 1938) was a British communist activist, known as a leading figure in the British Battalion during the Spanish Civil War.

== Early life and activism ==
Born in the East End of London, Tapsell joined the Communist Party of Great Britain (CPGB) at the age of sixteen, and also became prominent in the Young Communist League (YCL). He studied at the Lenin School in Moscow, taking his wife Esther, and co-ordinated the passing of documents between Moscow and the CPGB.

At the 1929 general election, Tapsell stood against future Leader of the Labour Party and Prime Minister Clement Attlee in Limehouse. However, he took only 245 votes, and was not elected. When the result was announced, he gave a speech complaining about the system of deposits, which, he claimed, made it difficult for representatives of the working class to stand.

By 1929, Tapsell was the secretary of the YCL, and he had been noticed by the international Comintern leadership as a promising talent, alongside William Rust, Robin Page Arnot and Robbie Robson, and the group enthusiastically embraced the new "Class Against Class" line. However, each member of the group was associated with a failed project; in Tapsell's case, it was that he had performed poorly when organising the party's support of textile workers locked out in West Yorkshire in 1930.

Tapsell was declared bankrupt in 1934, at which time he described his trades as "journalist", probably due to his role as circulation manager of the Daily Worker newspaper. In his spare time, Tapsell was also a keen jazz drummer, and was interested in sports, sitting on the National Committee of the British Workers' Sports Federation.

== Spanish Civil War ==
Tapsell volunteered to serve in the Spanish Civil War. His friend Harry Young was concerned that he was sent by the CPGB leadership because he was viewed as an opposition figure. He arrived in Spain on 1 March 1937, and enlisted with the British Battalion on 10 March. Initially, he was made Political Commissar of the British base at Albacete, and in this role, he was asked to investigate the May Days in Barcelona; he placed responsibility for the events on the Communist Party of Spain.

Tapsell soon saw action at the Battle of Brunete. With supplies and support limited, the battalion was reduced from 600 men to only 185. Tapsell led a delegation to General János Gálicz to ask for relief. Gálicz rejected the request, at which point Tapsell declared that he was "not fit to command a troop of Brownies, let alone a People's Army". Gálicz had Tapsell arrested for insubordination and threatened with execution. Although battalion commander Fred Copeman managed to get him released, after the battle, both were recalled to London alongside Jock Cunningham and George Aitken to explain the events. Cunningham and Aitken were prevented from returning, but Tapsell went back to the front line later in the year, and in November, he was made Political Commissar of the whole British Battalion.

In his role as commissar, Tapsell was generally well respected. Walter Gregory claimed that he was "surely the greatest of all those who served as political commissars" and noted that he was the first to advance and last to retreat. When they returned to Spain, Copeman told Tapsell that he would not accept his political authority, and Tapsell responded by picking up a rifle and focused on his role as a rifleman.

Tapsell fought in the Battle of Belchite, but shortly afterwards, the battalion was ambushed by Italian forces at Calaceite, and he died in battle. Although he had time to crawl out of the line of fire, he was never seen again. This prompted Copeman later to claim that Tapsell had survived the battle and been liquidated by "agents of Stalin" because he had his "teeth in something which was rotten and they weren't bloody well letting go". However, James K. Hopkins notes that there is no evidence to support this theory.

Party political offices
Preceded by William Rust	Secretary of the Young Communist League; 1929? – 1935?	Succeeded by John Gollan?
Military offices
Preceded by Harry Dobson	Political Commissar of the British Battalion; 1937 – 1938	Succeeded by Robert Hunt Cooney
