= Invergordon mutiny =

Revolt by sailors of the British Atlantic Fleet in 1931

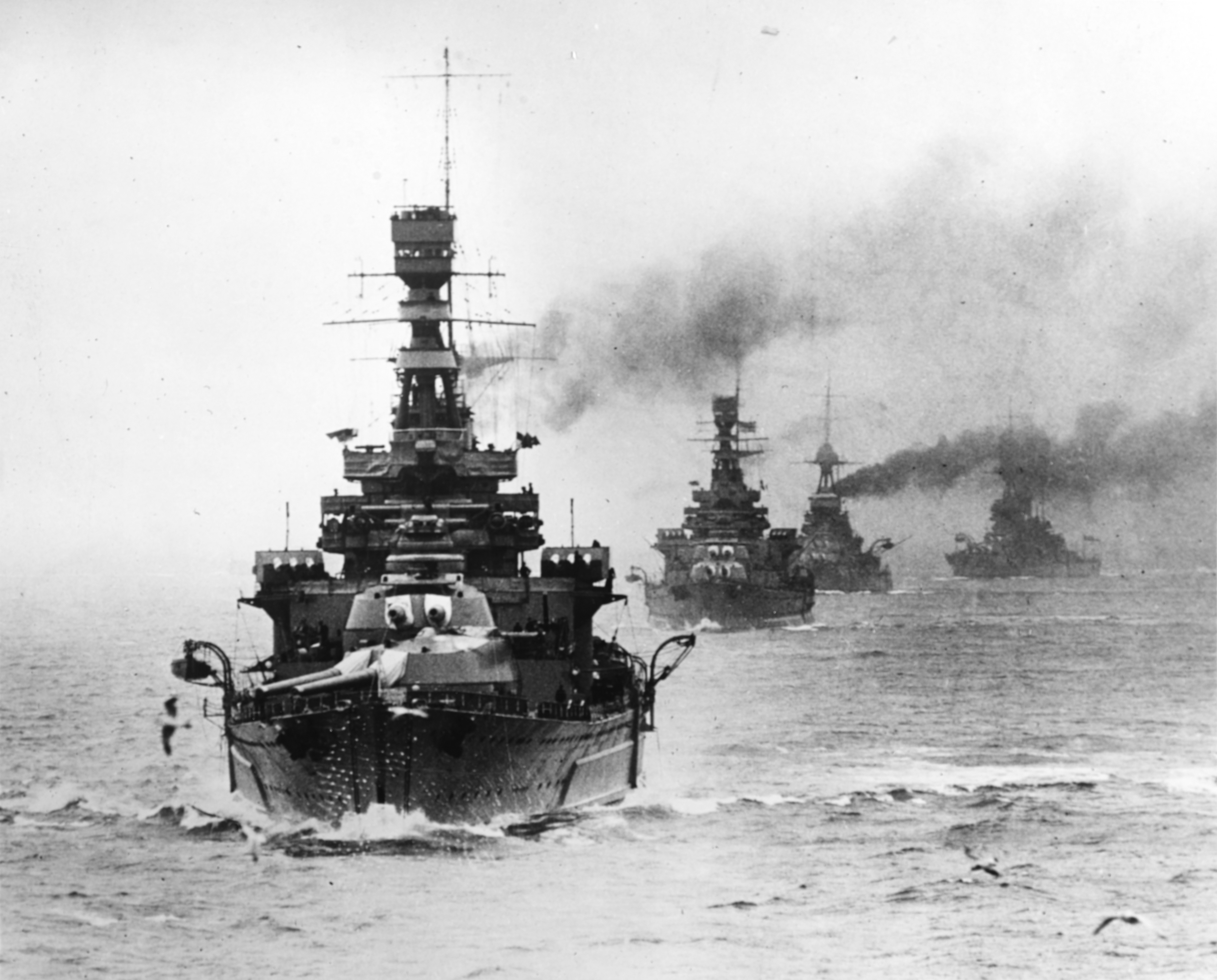
British Atlantic Fleet on exercise in the late 1920s

The Invergordon Mutiny (Scottish Gaelic: Aramac Inbhir Ghòrdain) was a mutiny by around 1,000 sailors in the British Atlantic Fleet that took place on 15–16 September 1931. For two days the sailors on the ships of the Royal Navy at Invergordon caused a disturbance and refused to take military orders in a dispute over pay.

The mutiny caused a panic on the London Stock Exchange and a run on the pound, bringing Britain's economic troubles to a head and forcing it off the Gold Standard on 21 September 1931.

== Causes ==
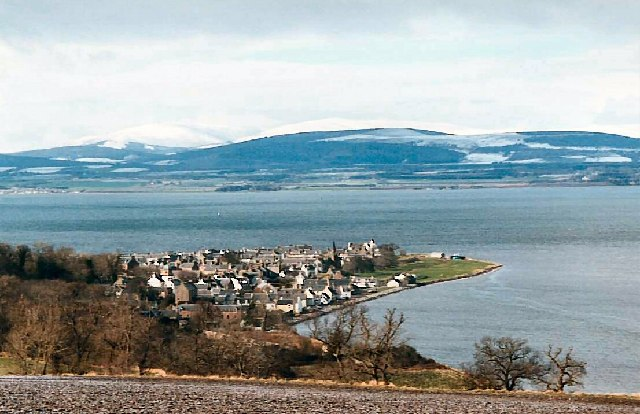
Cromarty Firth in Scotland

In September 1931, as part of its attempts to deal with the Great Depression, the new National Government launched cuts to public spending. In the Navy this amounted to a 10% pay cut (matching 10% cuts across the board for public sector workers) for officers and senior ratings, and for junior ratings on the "new rate" of pay, introduced for new entrants in 1925. Ratings below petty officer who had joined before 1925 would have their pay reduced to the same level, amounting to a 25% cut. Many Labour Party supporters also shared the sense of betrayal felt in the labour movement at Ramsay MacDonald's split with the Labour Party and his formation of the new National Government with the Conservatives.

Sailors of the Atlantic Fleet, arriving at Invergordon on the Cromarty Firth in Scotland in the afternoon of Friday 11 September, learned about the cuts from newspaper reports; some reports implied that a 25% cut would be imposed on all ratings. The shock of this news had a palpable effect. On 12 September, orders were received from the Admiralty confirming the pay cuts. On the evening of 13 September, by which time sailors had already started agitating, Rear-Admiral Wilfred Tomkinson, in temporary command of the fleet while Admiral Sir Michael Hodges was in hospital, received a letter from the Admiralty dated 10 September giving the reasons for the reduction in pay and the principles on which it had been based. The following morning, Tomkinson ordered the commanders of all ships present to read sections of the letter to their officers and crew. However, several ships had not received copies of the letter and some were unable to pass the information on to their companies until the next day. By that time, the mood for a mutiny had taken hold in many crews.

== Initial disturbances ==
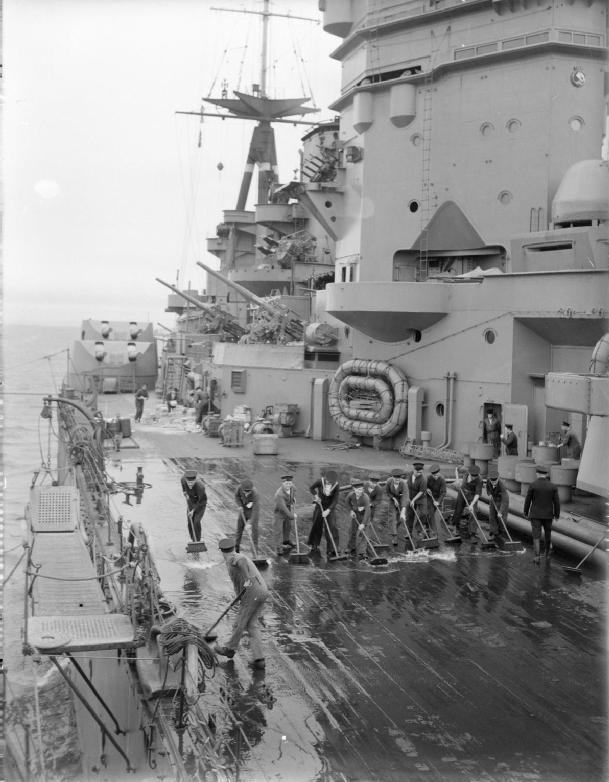
Crew on the deck of Rodney in 1940

Ten warships arrived in port on 11 September: Hood (the flagship), Adventure, Dorsetshire, Malaya, Norfolk, Repulse, Rodney, Valiant, Warspite, and York. After arriving, officers and crew had access to newspapers, which contained reports of the pay cuts. On the night of 12 September a group of sailors met at a football field. They voted to organise a strike and left singing "The Red Flag". The following evening a number of them made speeches at the canteen ashore criticising the cuts. The Officer of the Patrol reported this disturbance to Warspite, the ship of the watch that night, and requested reinforcements. Extra patrols were sent, led by the commander of Warspite, Captain Wake, and the canteen was closed early. The crews left peacefully, although further speeches were made at the pier. After considering reports about the incident from Wake and the Chief of Staff, Rear-Admiral Ragnar Colvin, Tomkinson decided not to take disciplinary action. He reported the incident and his decision to the Admiralty by telegram. Meanwhile, Nelson arrived at port. On 14 September, Warspite and Malaya left the harbour to perform planned exercises, and during the day four more ships arrived: Centurion, Shikari, Snapdragon and Tetrarch. That evening, Tomkinson hosted a dinner attended by most of the ships' commanders and various flag officers. Shortly before dinner, Tomkinson was informed that patrols had been dispatched from Hood and Valiant to deal with further disturbances at the canteen and in the open air ashore. These disturbances were characterised as disorderly, and civilians were reportedly spotted amongst the sailors. The Officer of the Patrol was able to address the assembly, but speeches, cheering and singing recommenced after he had finished. The sailors returned to their ships, but many gathered on deck after their return and continued their protests. Tomkinson informed the Admiralty of the protests, stating that the cause seemed to be the disproportionate pay cut of 25% for some ratings. He ordered commanders to return to their ships and report on the situation.

The reports indicated that there was no trouble in the cruisers, nor on the battlecruiser Repulse, but crews on the battlecruiser Hood and the battleships Rodney, Valiant and Nelson intended to prevent their ships from sailing in practice manoeuvres the next day; the protests were confined to ratings below leading rate, and did not show any animosity towards officers. In the early hours of 15 September, Tomkinson considered cancelling the exercises. However, after discussions with several flag officers, the commanders of Hood and Nelson and the Officers of the Patrol who had witnessed events, he decided against this, expecting that Repulse would follow orders and this would quell any resistance on other ships. He ordered commanders to investigate complaints in due course and report typical cases that he could use to represent the protests to the Admiralty, and informed the Admiralty that he expected problems sailing in the morning.

== Mutiny ==
On the morning of 15 September, Repulse sailed on time at 06:30, but sailors on the other four capital ships due to sail had already begun to refuse orders. On Hood and Nelson, crews carried out the ordinary harbour routine, refusing to put to sea; on Valiant and Rodney, crews carried out only essential duties, including the provision of safety patrols and fire guards, and did so without any recourse to their officers. Throughout the day, cheering crowds massed on the forecastles of all ships except Centurion and Exeter. On Rodney, a piano was dragged on deck and songs were sung. Officers, who issued orders and threats through loudspeakers, were ignored and ridiculed. Valiant unmoored and attempted to put to sea with a limited number of men on duty, but was unable to proceed. On Tomkinson's own ship, Hood, crew members prevented officers and senior ratings from unmooring the ship. Even Royal Marines, expected to enforce discipline and break up any mutiny, joined the strike. Tomkinson suspended the exercises until further notice, cancelled all leave and called for the investigations of complaints to proceed as quickly as possible. Warspite, Malaya and Repulse were ordered to return to harbour.

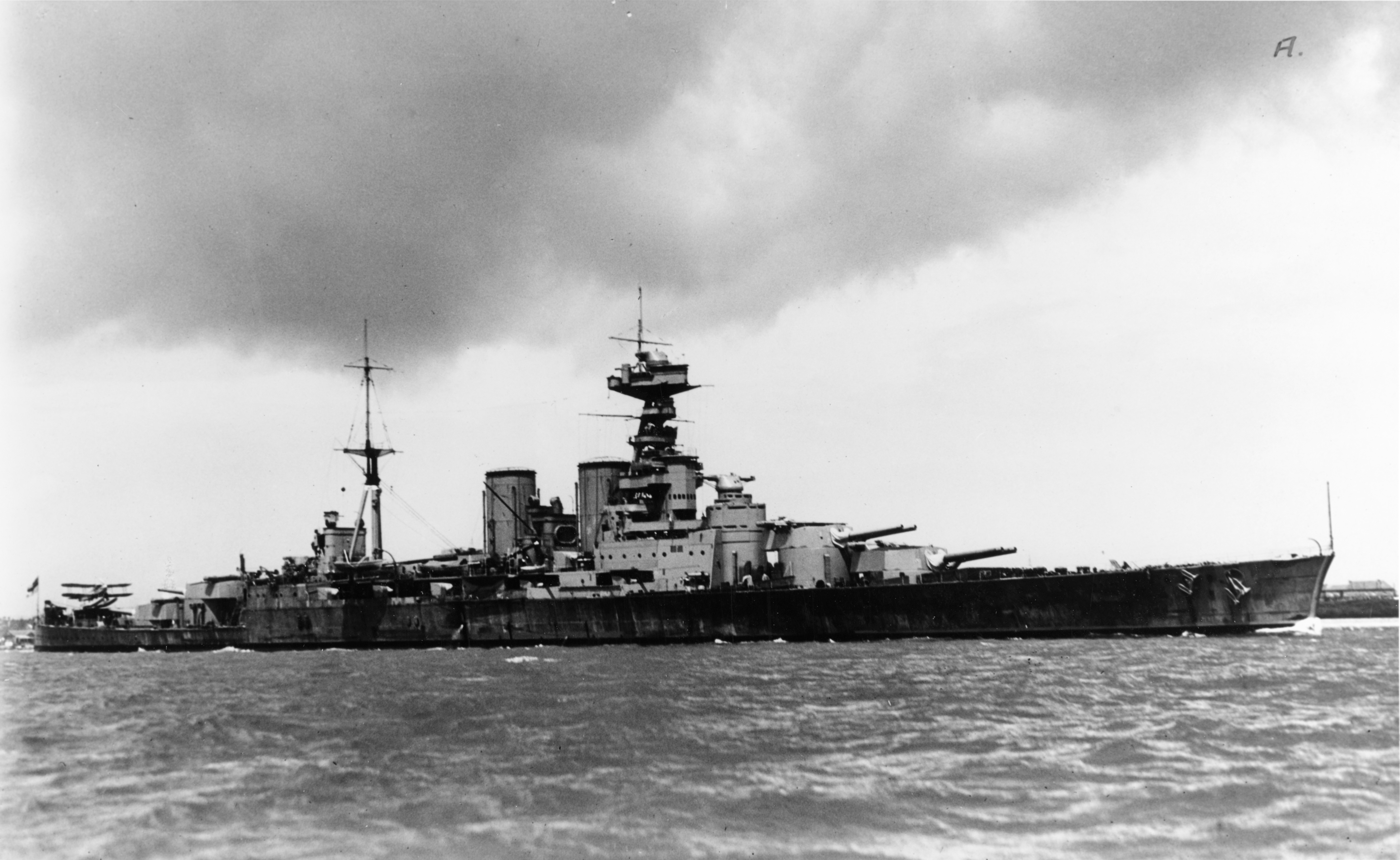
Hood around the time of the mutiny

In the afternoon, Tomkinson again informed the Admiralty of the situation and its chief cause, asking for an early decision to be communicated and stating he did not believe it would be possible to restore order, or prevent further deterioration of the situation, until a decision was received. He finally received a reply at 20:00, instructing him to inform sailors that the existing pay rates would remain in force until the end of the month and that the Admiralty expected the men to uphold the traditions of service and carry out their duties. The Admiralty stated that the cut in pay was only 10%, but this ignored the situation for those on the old pay rate. In a second telegram, Tomkinson was instructed to resume exercises as soon as he had completed his investigations into the complaints. Tomkinson believed that this response showed he had failed to communicate the gravity of the situation and replied that it would be impossible to resume exercises in the circumstances. Incitement to stop work was spreading from deck to deck: crews on Norfolk and Adventure had joined those on Rodney and Valiant in performing only essential duties, with Dorsetshire and Hood set to follow suit. There were also reports that some petty officers, who had continued to follow orders although they had not attempted to get junior ratings to return to work, were starting to join the strike.

In the early hours of 16 September, Tomkinson informed the Fleet that Admiral Colvin had been dispatched to the Admiralty to present sailors' complaints in person, but no decision could reasonably be expected for a day or two; he expected all crews to return to duty.

On the morning of 16 September, Tomkinson received the last of the complaints. He dispatched the Fleet Accountant Officer with these to the Admiralty, and sent extracts by telegram. Having discussed the situation with Rear-Admirals Astley-Rushton (Second Cruiser Squadron, on Dorsetshire) and French (Second Battle Squadron, on Warspite), he reported his belief that the mutiny would worsen unless an immediate concession was made. He suggested junior ratings on the old rate should remain on that rate with a cut of 10%, and marriage allowances should be extended to ratings under the age of 25. He also asked that members of the Admiralty board visit Invergordon to discuss matters in person. Shortly afterwards, he was informed by the Admiralty that the matter was being considered by the Cabinet, and communicated this to the Fleet. Meanwhile, the crew of Hood had ceased all but essential duties. Some sailors were threatening to damage machinery and leave ships without permission. In the afternoon, the Admiralty ordered the ships of the Fleet to return to their home ports immediately. Tomkinson directed the ships to proceed in their squadrons as soon as possible, and gave officers and crew with family at Invergordon leave to visit the shore and say their goodbyes. That night, all ships sailed from Invergordon as ordered.

== Aftermath ==
In summarising the mutiny for the Admiralty, Tomkinson reported that the crews had remained respectful to their officers throughout, and that officers had done their best to explain the government's reasons for the cut in pay and that complaints would be taken seriously. He concluded that the mutiny had been caused primarily by the 25% cut for junior ratings who had joined the service before 1925, that there were no grievances besides the pay cut, and his belief that the complaint was well founded. He also believed that any use of force would have made the situation much worse.

The Cabinet accepted Tomkinson's recommendation that ratings on the old rate of pay remain on that rate, with a 10% cut in line with the rest of the service. It was made clear that further acts of insurrection would be severely punished. A number of the organisers of the strike were jailed, while 200 sailors were discharged from the service. A further 200-odd sailors were purged from elsewhere in the Navy, accused of attempting to incite similar incidents. The Admiralty held Tomkinson accountable for the mutiny, blaming him for failing to punish dissidents after the first protests.

The mutiny caused a panic on the London Stock Exchange and a run on the pound, bringing Britain's economic troubles to a head and forced it off the Gold Standard on 21 September 1931.

Len Wincott, a leader of the mutiny, defected to the USSR in 1934. During World War II he survived the Siege of Leningrad but in 1946 he was sent to the Gulag after being accused of being a British spy; he was imprisoned for more than a decade. After his release in the 1950s, he became a friend of Donald MacLean in Moscow. Another leader, Navy boxer Fred Copeman, commanded the British Battalion of the International Brigades in the Spanish Civil War.

== See also ==
- Spithead and Nore mutinies
- HNLMS De Zeven Provinciën (1909)#Mutiny
- Royal Indian Navy Mutiny
- Chilean naval mutiny of 1931
- Kronstadt rebellion
- Wilhelmshaven mutiny
- Revolt of the Lash
- Royal Canadian Navy mutinies 1949
