= Wincott =

Wincott is a surname. Notable people with the surname include:

- Daniel Wincott, English political scientist
- Harold Wincott (1906–1969), British economist and journalist
- Harry Wincott (1867–1947), English songwriter
- Jeff Wincott (born 1957), Canadian actor and martial artist
- Len Wincott (1907–1983), English sailor, mutineer and communist activist who defected to the Soviet Union
- Michael Wincott (born 1958), Canadian actor, younger brother of Jeff
