= Alex McDade =

British political commissar

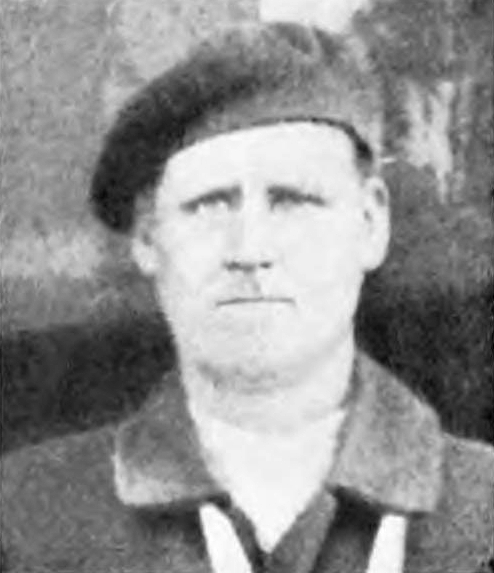
- McDade in Spain, 1937
- Born: 1905
- Died: 6 July 1937 (aged 31–32)
- Military career
- Units: XV International Brigade; British Battalion
- Conflicts: Spanish Civil War: Battle of Jarama; Battle of Brunete

Alex McDade (1905–1937) was a Glasgow poet and labourer who went to Spain to fight with XV International Brigade in the Spanish Civil War. He was a political commissar with the British Battalion and wounded at the Battle of Jarama in February 1937. He was killed on the first day of the Battle of Brunete at Villanueva de la Cañada on 6 July 1937. He wrote the poem "Valley of Jarama".
