= Guadalix =

Watercourse in Spain

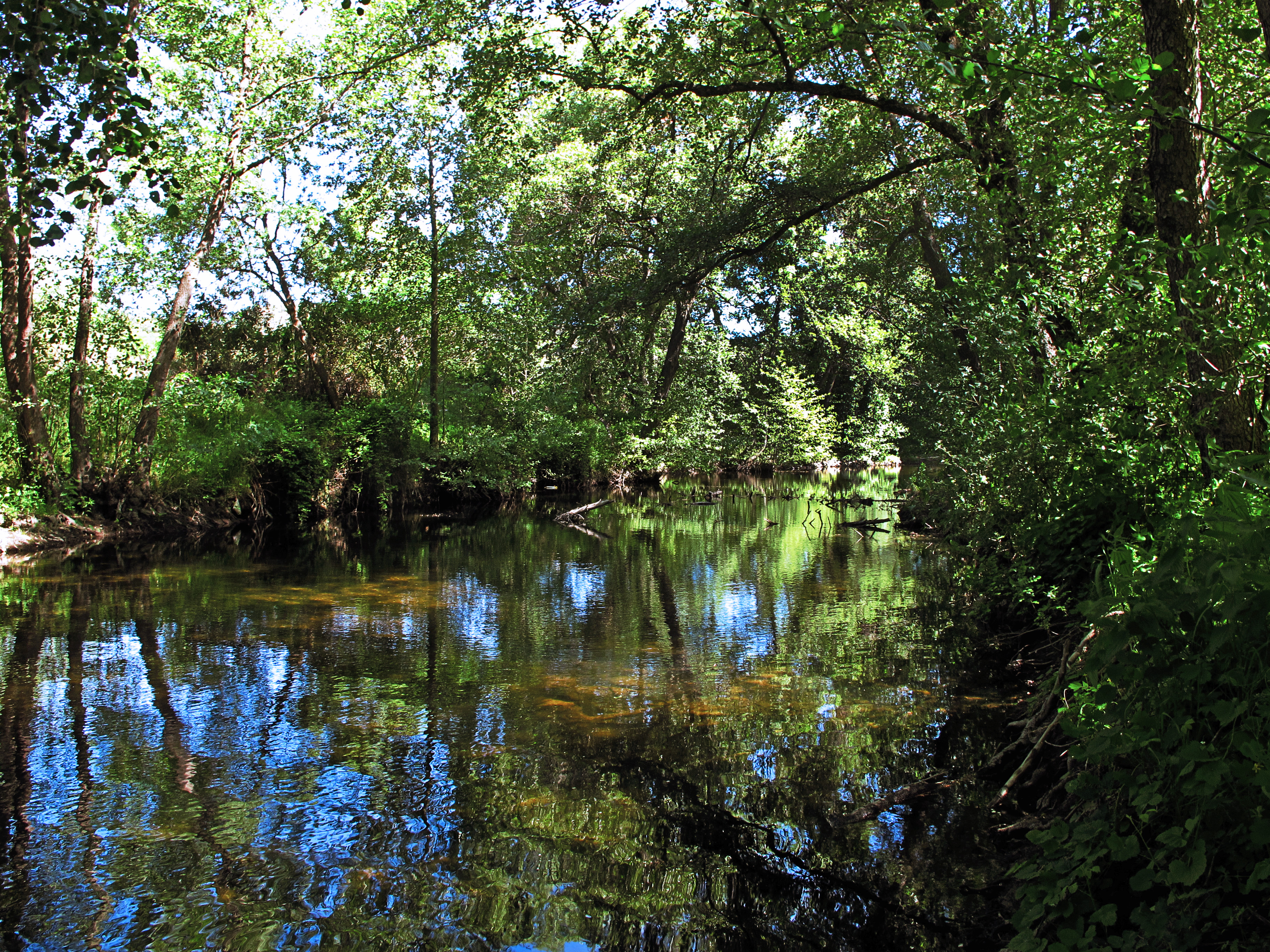

Location
- Country: Spain

Physical characteristics
- Source: Puerto de la Morcuera
  - location: Miraflores de la Sierra
  - coordinates: 41°0′55″N 3°51′4″W
- Mouth: Jarama
  - location: Algete
  - coordinates: 40°36′58″N 3°34′24″W
- Length: 42 km (26 mi)

Basin features
- Progression: Jarama→ Tagus→ Atlantic Ocean
- River system: Tagus

The Guadalix is a river of Spain located in the centre of the Iberian Peninsula, a right-bank tributary of the Jarama.

It springs out of the Sierra de Guadarrama, in the valley flanked by the La Najarra Peak, el Puerto de la Morcuera, the Alto de la Genciana and the Cordal de la Vaqueriza. Featuring a total length of 42 km, it runs southeastwards through the Community of Madrid until discharging in the Jarama near the Santo Domingo housing development (Algete), next to the Jarama Circuit.

Its waters are impounded by the El Vellón Reservoir.

Regarding the etymology of the hidronym Guadalix; the prefix comes from the Arabic wadi ("river") while the suffix -alix has been identified either as an alleged Arab anthroponym or as possibly pre-Arab.
