= Jarama Valley (song) =

"El Valle del Jarama"

Song
- Language: Spanish
- English title: Jarama Valley
- Published: 1938
- Composer: Traditional (music from "Red River Valley")
- Lyricist: Alex McDade

"Jarama Valley" also known as "El Valle del Jarama" is a song from the Second Spanish Republic. Referring to the Spanish Civil War Battle of Jarama, the song uses the tune of Red River Valley.

The battle was fought from 6–27 February 1937, in the Jarama river valley a few kilometres east of Madrid. The seasoned troops of Franco's Army of Africa assaulted positions held by the inexperienced volunteers of the International Brigades, in particular the British and the Dimitrov battalions. It ended in stalemate, with both sides entrenching. At the end of three weeks, in particular after a counter-attack on what became known as "Suicide Hill", the death count was high. The British Battalion lost 225 of its 600 men and the Lincoln Battalion lost 125 out of 500.

== Original four-verse versions ==
The earliest known version of the lyrics was written by Alex McDade, of the British Battalion, XV International Brigade and published in 1938 in The Book of the XV International Brigade by the Commissariat of War, Madrid, 1938. It is squarely a soldier's song; grumbling about the boredom, lack of leave and lack of female company. McDade was a labourer from Glasgow who became a political commissar in the XV International Brigade, responsible for the men's welfare. He was wounded at Jarama and died in a hospital in Glasgow of wounds sustained 6 July 1937 at the Battle of Brunete. Perhaps McDade wrote the song to focus his comrades' minds on something other than the casualties, but "its humorous cynicism made it popular in all battalions". Although the provenance of the other early version is unknown it was probably written for (or evolved at) post-war veterans reunions. According to scholar Jim Jump, it was first published on 8 January 1939 in London in a booklet for a British Battalion reunion and "has continued to be sung at International Brigade commemorative events".

Early version

There’s a valley in Spain called Jarama,
That's a place that we all know so well,
for 'tis there that we wasted our manhood,
And most of our old age as well.

From this valley they tell us we're leaving
But don't hasten to bid us adieu
For e'en though we make our departure
We'll be back in an hour or two

Oh, we're proud of our British Battalion,
And the marathon record it's made,
Please do us this one little favour
And take this last word to Brigade:

"You will never be happy with strangers,
They would not understand you as we,
So remember the Jarama Valley
And the old men who wait patiently".

Reunion version

There’s a Valley in Spain called Jarama,
It’s a place that we all know so well,
It is there that we gave of our manhood,
And so many of our brave comrades fell.

We are proud of the British Battalion,
And the stand for Madrid that they made,
For they fought like true sons of the soil.
As part of the Fifteenth Brigade.

With the rest of the international column,
In the stand for the freedom of Spain
We swore in the valley of Jarama
That fascism never will reign.

Now we’ve left that dark valley of sorrow
And its memories of regret,
So before we continue this reunion
Let us stand to our glorious dead.

== Woody Guthrie version ==
Lyrics:

There's a valley in Spain called Jarama
it's a place that we all know so well
it was there that we fought against the fascists
we saw a peaceful valley turn to hell.

From this valley they say we are going
but don't hasten to bid us adieu
even though we lost the battle at Jarama
we'll set this valley free 'fore we're through.

We were men of the Lincoln battalion
we're proud of the fight that we made
we know that you people of the valley
will remember our Lincoln brigade.

From this valley they say we are going
but don't hasten to bid us adieu
even though we lost the battle at Jarama
we'll set this valley free 'fore we're through.

You will never find peace with these fascists
you will never find friends such as we
so remember that valley of Jarama
and the people that'll set that valley free.

From this valley they say that we're going
Don't hasten to bid us adieu
even though we lost the battle at Jarama
we'll set this valley free 'fore we're through.

All this world is like this valley called Jarama
so green and so bright and so fair
no fascists can dwell in our valley
nor breathe in our new freedom's air.

From this valley they say that we're going
Do not hasten to bid us adieu
even though we lost the battle at Jarama
we'll set this valley free 'fore we're through.

== Three-verse versions: Jarama Valley / El Valle del Jarama ==
This shorter (three-verse) version of the song—with variant versions, are something of an anthem for veterans, particularly those from the Abraham Lincoln Battalion. Woody Guthrie and Pete Seeger have recorded it. In addition to this version, other Spanish variants exist.

Jarama Valley

There's a valley in Spain called Jarama
It's a place that we all know so well
It was there that we gave of our manhood
And so many of our brave comrades fell.

We are proud of the Lincoln Battalion
And the fight for Madrid that it made
There we fought like true sons of the people
As part of the Fifteenth Brigade.

Now we're far from that valley of sorrow
But its memory we ne'er will forget
So before we conclude this reunion
Let us stand to our glorious dead.

El Valle del Jarama

Hay un valle en España llamado Jarama
un lugar que conocemos muy bien,
allí es donde dimos nuestro valor
y donde muchos de nuestros valientes camaradas cayeron.

Estamos orgullosos del Batallón Lincoln
y de la lucha por Madrid que hicieron
lucharon como verdaderos hijos del pueblo
como parte de la Quinta Brigada.

Ahora estamos lejos de ese valle del dolor
pero su memoria nunca la olvidaremos
Así que antes de que concluya esta reunión
Pongámonos en pie por nuestros gloriosos muertos.

== German version: In dem Tal dort am Rio Jarama (Lincoln-Bataillion) ==
Ernst Busch, the famous communist actor, singer and participant in the Spanish Civil War, wrote and sang a German text for this song, which is known under the title "In dem Tal dort am Rio Jarama" (In that valley there at Rio Jarama") or as "Lied des Lincoln Bataillions" (Song of Lincoln Battalion)

In dem Tal dort am Rio Jarama

In dem Tal dort am Rio Jarama
Schlugen wir unsre blutigste Schlacht.
Doch wir haben, auf Tod und Verderben
Die Faschisten zum Stehen gebracht.

Zeigt uns wie man mit alten Gewehren
Einen Panzer-Angriff heil übersteht!
Zeigt uns wie man in offner Feldschlacht
Einem Tiefflieger-Angriff entgeht.

Ja, wir haben die Stellung verlassen;
Denn es half auch kein: Oh, Herr – mon Dieu!
Kameraden der Inter-Brigaden
Unsern Toten ein letztes Adieu!

Eines Tages da stehn Campesinos
Als die Sieger auf spanischem Feld!
Und das Tal dort am Rio Jarama
Wird gehören dem Mann, der’s bestellt!

== Russian version: Jarama valley (Батальон Линкольна) ==
There is a Russian version of "Jarama Valley" too. It is actually a poetical translation of Ernst Buch's text by Tatiana Vladimirskaya with another arrangement for music. The Russian variant is not very similar to the "canonical" text and is much more optimistic

Батальон Линкольна

Там, где бурные воды Харамы
Мы докажем рабочую твердь
И подняв наше красное знамя
Победим и страданья и смерть!

Пусть враги ухмыльнутся довольно
Что у нас артиллерии нет,
Но штыки батальона ЛинкОльна
Не уступят фашистской броне!

Там, где бурные воды Харамы
Мы докажем рабочую твердь
И подняв наше красное знамя
Победим и страданья и смерть!

Мы позиций своих не оставим,
Неприступным наш будет форпост
За победу стеною мы встанем,
Даже смерти мы скажем Адьёс!

Там, где бурные воды Харамы
Мы докажем рабочую твердь
И подняв наше красное знамя
Победим и страданья и смерть!

Здесь когда-нибудь вспомнят крестьяне,
Тех, кто доблестно шёл на врага
На далёкой испанской Хараме
О бойцах добровольных бригад!

== Chinese version: Jarama valley (雅拉玛山谷) ==
A Chinese version of the song was taught as a "Children's song" in music classes for primary schools until as late as the 1990s. The lyrics are a simplified translation of the original to make it less personal (and tells the story from a neutral perspective rather than from a first-person perspective) and easier for the children to learn, while the speed of the song is also slower.

雅拉玛山谷

西班牙有个山谷叫雅拉玛，
人民都在怀念它，
多少个同志倒在山下，
雅拉玛开遍鲜花。
国际纵队留在雅拉玛，
保卫自由的西班牙，
他们宣誓要守在山旁，
打死法西斯狗豺狼。

Literal Translation

There's a valley in Spain called Jarama,
The people are all longing for it,
Many comrades fell under the mountain,
Flowers bloom all over Jarama.

The International Brigade stayed in Jarama,
To defend a free Spain,
They swore to defend by the mountains,
To kill the fascist dogs and jackals.

== See also ==
- List of socialist songs
- Songs of the Spanish Civil War

== Notes and references ==
- Hugh Thomas, "The Spanish Civil War". Hugh Thomas' first edition of "The Spanish Civil War" was published in 1961. There have been several editions and updates of this basic account of the war, published in both Spanish and in English. The 1961 English edition was first published by Eyre and Spotriswoode Ltd. Penguin published a revised and updated edition in 1965. The fourth Edition was published in the UK and Canada by Penguin in 2003 (ISBN 0-141-01161-0). The description of the battle and the generous involvement of the British, Irish and North American volunteers may be found in pages 571 through 578. According to Thomas, the Lincoln Brigade, 450 effectives in total, suffered 275 casualties, with 120 deaths. Thomas himself cites Between the Bullet and the Lie, by Cecil Eby, New York, 1969, as the best account of the Lincoln Battalion. "La Guerra Civil española" was published in 1967, in Paris, by Editorial Ruedo Ibérico.
- Beevor, Antony. (2006). The Battle for Spain: The Spanish Civil War 1936-1939. London: Weidenfeld & Nicolson. ISBN 978-0-297-84832-5
- Jump, Jim (ed) (2006). Poets from Spain: British and Irish International Brigaders on the Spanish Civil War London: Lawrence & Wishart. ISBN 978-1-905007-39-4
- Ryan, Frank (ed.) [1938] (1975). The Book of the XV International Brigade Madrid: Commissariat of War [1938]. Newcastle upon Tyne: Frank Graham (facsimile edition 1975). ISBN B001A6IG7W
