= Jock Cunningham =

British volunteer in the International Brigades

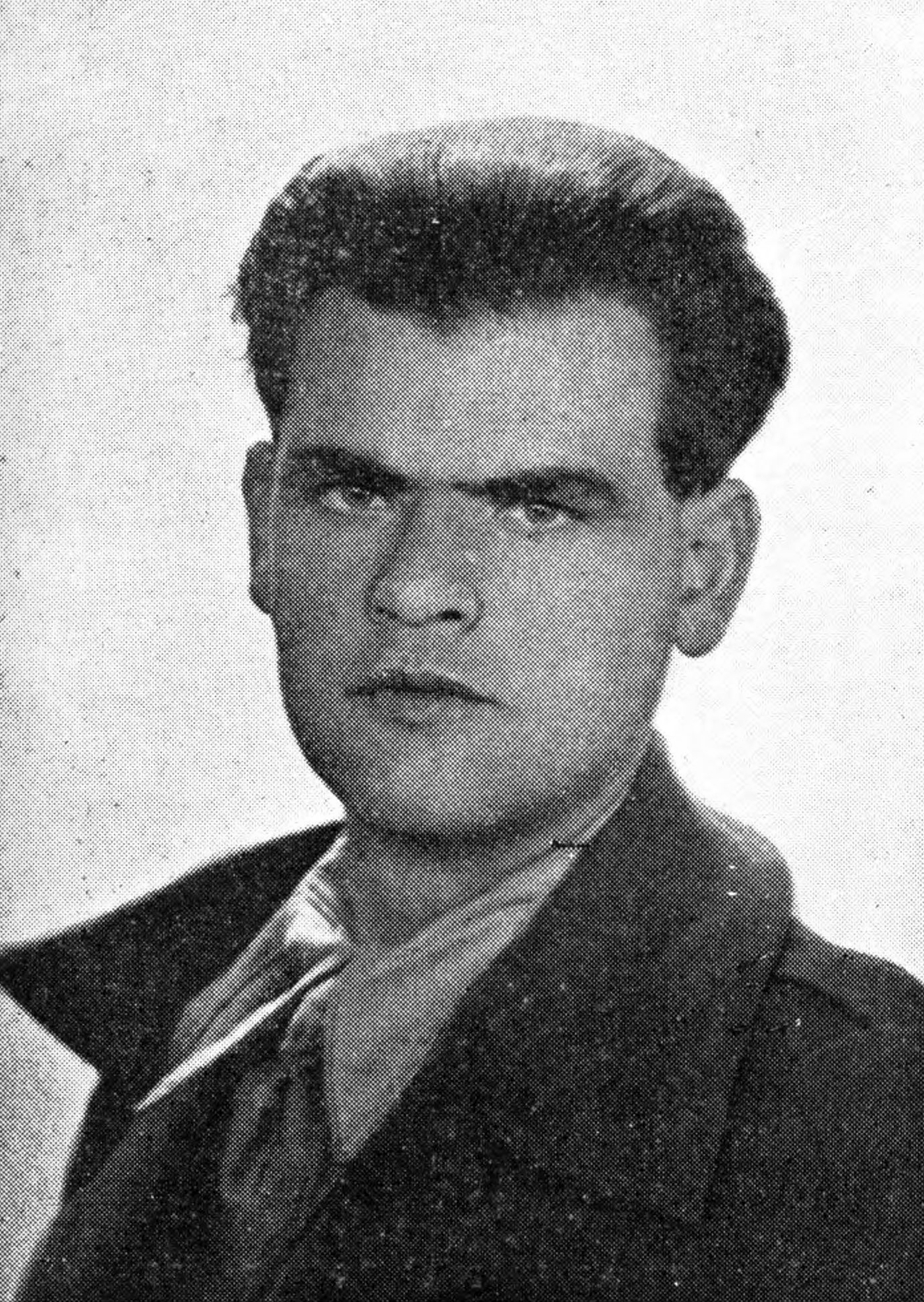
Cunningham c. 1938

Joseph Wallace "Jock" Cunningham (20 December 1902 – 22 February 1969) was a British volunteer in the International Brigades in the Spanish Civil War. He became a battalion and brigade commander and rose to the rank of lieutenant colonel. He played a key role in the Battle of Jarama, one of the principal military actions of the Spanish Civil War.

== Early life ==
Jock Cunningham was born along with his twin brother Thomas Michael Cunningham on 20 December 1902 at 17 Balgray Road, Glasgow, to John Cunningham, a Stationary Engine Keeper, and Mary (Annati) Cunningham, who married in 1890 in Malta. He was one of a family of twenty-two with military tradition. His father was a Second Boer War veteran and six of his brothers also served in the British Army. As a young boy, the family moved around Lanarkshire before settling in Coatbridge, Scotland. He was brought up in "The Whifflet" and lived at 77b Whifflet Street, Whifflet, Coatbridge.

In 1928–1929 Cunningham led a mutiny of the Argyll & Sutherland Highlanders in Jamaica against the unacceptable conditions imposed on the men. He was sentenced to six years and imprisoned in the Glasshouse at Aldershot, a British Military Prison with a reputation for brutality. He made a considerable fuss while incarcerated including going on hunger strike three or four times and eventually when a letter he had smuggled out of the prison was published in a Fife newspaper questions were asked in the Commons. Hearing of Cunningham's plight and impressed by his determination the Communist Party of Great Britain (CPGB) campaigned for his release. His release was something of legend as it is noted in The Spanish Civil War by Hugh Thomas that Cunningham has the reputation of being: "the only soldier in a military jail in England who made such a fuss that the authorities freed him to rid themselves of the trouble of looking after him". He was released after serving two years and four months of his sentence.

While with the Argyll & Sutherland Highlanders he was company champion in many events including: 1 mile, 2 mile track events and also welterweight boxing champion. Edinburgh City Councillor, Donald Renton's older brother served with him in Jamaica and described him as "the gamest man in the British Army". Prior to 1936, he was active as an organiser in the London area for the National Unemployed Workers' Movement during which time he led an unemployed march to Brighton in 1933. He worked as a miner and labourer.

== Spanish Civil War Years ==
At the time of Franco's attack on the democratically elected government of Spain Cunningham was one of many Scots who volunteered to fight alongside the people of Spain to defend their freedom and democracy. As Britain and many other democratic nations of Europe refused military aid to the Spanish Government and maintained a policy of "non-intervention" such an act of volunteering was illegal. Nonetheless volunteers recognised the threat Fascism would post to all democratic nations and as the war went on volunteers from many countries were organised into the International Brigades.

He arrived in Spain 19 October 1936 and was involved in the early defence of Madrid after joining the Machine-Gun Company of the Commune de Paris Battalion, part of the XI International Brigade. He rapidly rose to Captain. In December 1936 he fought at Lopera as a section commander with the British and Irish Company of the XIV International Brigade. He was made a Major and Commander of the British No. 1 Company and as a Lieutenant Colonel he was in charge of the entire English-speaking brigade.

The small 34-year-old played a key role in the February 1937 Battle of Jarama. He was wounded after leading the January 1937 battle at Los Rozas and in order to fight at Jarama it is reported that he "left hospital with a fever to go and fight". The battle at Jarama was one of the principal actions of the Spanish Civil War. If the Jarama valley were surrendered, the road from Madrid to Valencia would be cut off allowing Madrid to be taken by the Fascists which for all intents and purposes would cost the Spanish government the war. Along with Frank Ryan he rallied the remnants of the British Battalion in a defensive action which held the line outside Madrid. Cunningham led a bombing raid down a trench held at one end by the Fascists and at the other end by the Spanish government troops. They took this trench and with six men and a Lewis gun, cut off a group of some 80 Fascists from their own lines. This almost impossible defence blocked Franco's attempt to seize the capital. The Jarama action had left him with three rifle wounds through his left upper arm and another rifle bullet under his shoulder blade that had entered his left chest, passed through, and lodged there. Cunningham was hospitalised from 15 March 1937.

He later served as Chief of Brigade Staff of the XV Battalion, but after the battle of Brunete the Communist Party of Great Britain recalled all the leaders of the British volunteers back to London. Spanish Government supporters praised Cunningham's military skill and en route to London, he was welcomed back to Glasgow on 31 August 1937 by 2,500 Communist Party members.

=== Controversy and resignation from the Communist Party ===
Jock Cunningham was a popular and courageous commander. His military influence was praised by Harry Pollitt, General Secretary of the Communist Party of Great Britain (CPGB) during his speech at a Unity Campaign meeting 15 March 1937 in Liverpool: "One day we shall tell our children about the defense of Madrid, this epic story that can never die in the pages of World History. I think of Jock Cunningham leading his men fearlessly and unafraid…dancing with death. A word of encouragement here...ceaselessly moving among his men until everyone has become influenced with the mighty unconquerable spirit of a worker blessed with a fiery hatred of Fascism…this is Jock Cunningham. Our Chapaev". In The Spanish Civil War, Hugh Thomas, explains the reference to Chapaev. Speaking of Cunningham he said: "He was a man of great physical strength and possessed marked qualities of leadership. He was nicknamed the "Chapaev" after the guerrilla leader of the Russian Civil War – and there could not at that time have been a greater compliment."

After differences arose in the CPGB, Pollitt decided Cunningham and fellow Scot Commissar George Aitken were not to return to Spain. It was a controversial decision because it was the two most capable and respected men who were not allowed to return to Spain. The official explanation was that, due to the obvious difficulties of the war, differences had arisen between the group of leaders and it was decided they could not all work together again. Aitken was appalled by the decision. Nonetheless, Pollitt stuck by it. Cunningham was placed on extended recuperation and was given a place on the Party executive.

Fred Copeman revealed many years later that there was a political motive for Cunningham's removal from the front line. Pollitt feared that he was too independent and single minded to be easily controlled.

In response to the cynical disregard for all he had done, he chose to resign from the CPGB drift away and lead his life in anonymity. He was last seen in the 1950s on the fringes of a political meeting in Aberdeen. Jock spent the rest of his days working as a casual labourer travelling across Britain. He was very close with his siblings, particularly his sister Annie and older brother John. He had residence in the family home on Old Post Office Lane in North Queensferry, although he rarely stayed longer than four weeks at a time.

== Death and legacy ==
He had long suffered pain in his chest which he believed to be due to the bullet lodged there. On invitation of his older brother John to come to Canada, he decided to enter hospital to deal with the war injury which troubled him. It was discovered he had carcinoma, most likely the source of his pain. He died of bronchial carcinoma at Pavilion 11, Mearnskirk General Hospital, Renfrewshire, Glasgow on 22 February 1969.

Writing of Jock Cunningham to The New York Times in April 1937 Ernest Hemingway said "For what he had done he would have had a V.C (Victoria Cross) in the last war. In this war there are no decorations. Wounds are the only decorations…"

In the 1990s the Scottish playwright, Hector MacMillan, wrote a play about Jock Cunningham entitled "A Greater Tomorrow", focusing on his service in the Spanish Civil War and speculating about his later years. Cunningham was portrayed by Derek Anders.

In 2010 he was subject of a BBC Radio Scotland documentary.
