= Jarama =

Tributary of the Tagus river

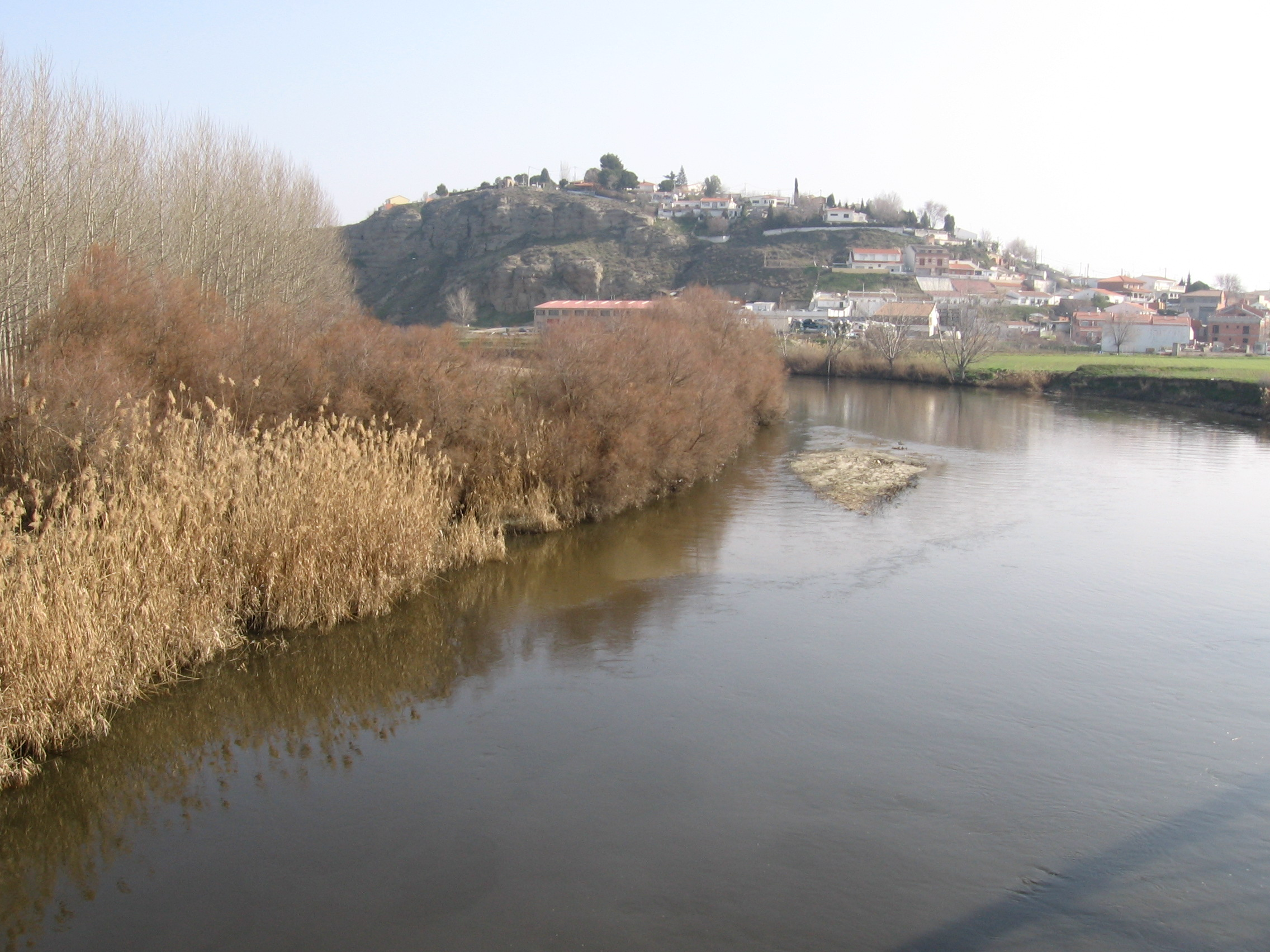
- Jarama River in Titulcia

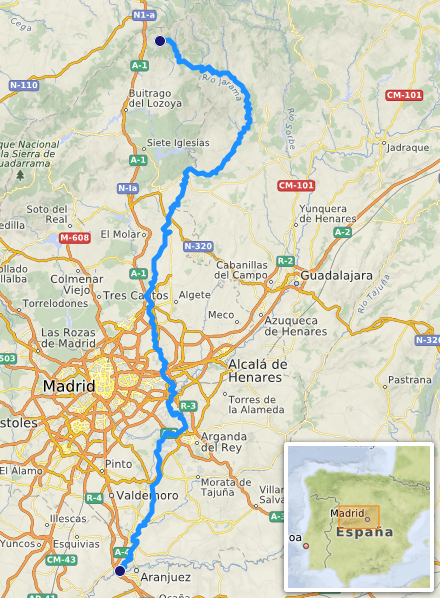
- Path of the Jarama

Location
- Country: Spain
- State: Guadalajara, Madrid
- Region: Iberian Peninsula

Physical characteristics
- Source: Peña Cebollera
  - location: Sierra de Ayllón
  - coordinates: 41°9′58″N 3°32′18″W
  - elevation: 2,119 m (6,952 ft)
- Mouth: Tagus
  - location: near Aranjuez
  - coordinates: 40°1′51″N 3°38′59″W
  - elevation: 494 m (1,621 ft)
- Length: 194 km (121 mi)
- Basin size: 5,047 km^{2} (1,949 sq mi)
- Discharge
  - average: 31.7 m^{3}/s (1,120 cu ft/s)

Basin features
- Progression: Tagus→ Atlantic Ocean
- River system: Tagus
- Tributaries
  - left: Henares, Tajuña
  - right: Lozoya, Guadalix, Manzanares

Jarama (Spanish pronunciation: [xaˈɾama]) is a river in central Spain. It flows north to south and passes east of Madrid where the El Atazar Dam is built on a tributary, the Lozoya River. It flows into the river Tagus in Aranjuez. The Manzanares is a tributary of the Jarama.

== The Jarama in history ==
The Jarama was the scene of fierce fighting in 1937 during the Spanish Civil War. Nationalist forces crossed the river in an attempt to cut the main road from Madrid to the Republican capital at Valencia. Nationalist forces led by Spanish Legionnaires and Moroccan soldiers (Regulares) of the Army of Africa were confronted by forces from the Republic including the 15th International Brigade.

The song Jarama Valley, with lyrics referencing the battle, became popular among the Republican battalions.

== In fiction ==
El Jarama is a 1955 novel by Rafael Sánchez Ferlosio about a group of working-class youngsters from Madrid meeting for a picnic by the river on a summer day. Its realistic dialog renovated Spanish novels, and it won the Premio Nadal (Nadal Prize) in 1955.

== See also ==
- List of rivers of Spain
- There's a Valley in Spain called Jarama (Song)
