= Len Wincott =

English sailor, mutineer and communist activist who later defected to the Soviet Union

Len Wincott (1907 – January 1983) was an English sailor, mutineer and communist activist who later defected to the Soviet Union.

== Childhood and early naval career ==
Len Wincott was born in poverty in Leicester in 1907. Having few other options, he joined the Royal Navy as a boy seaman in 1923 after time at the training centre for boys at Shotley in Suffolk. Despite the low pay and low peacetime prospects, the navy provided him with a degree of security. His service record up to the end of 1929 is at The National Archives (piece ADM 188/861) and shows a model seaman.

== Invergordon mutiny, September 1931 ==
In September 1931, as part of its attempts to deal with the Great Depression, the new National Government launched cuts to public spending. Navy spending cuts were translated into a 10% pay cut (matching 10% cuts across the board for public sector workers). However, the cuts were not applied equally to all ranks. Sailors of the Atlantic Fleet, arriving at Invergordon (on the Cromarty Firth in Scotland) in the afternoon of Friday 11 September, learned about the cuts from newspaper reports. Wincott – then a 24-year-old able seaman serving on the heavy cruiser Norfolk, organised meetings which prevented the vessel from moving for two days.

The mutiny lasted two days (15–16 September 1931). Wincott, with another able seaman – Fred Copeman – became a member of the Norfolk's strike committee. After the mutiny the Royal Navy imprisoned dozens of the ringleaders and dismissed hundreds more, Wincott among them.

== Communist Party activist ==
Shortly after being discharged from the Royal Navy, he became involved with the Communist Party speaking at meetings up and down Britain. Wincott mentions in his memoirs that he was aware of being followed and of his letters being read, he named one of the informers as disaffected shipmate, Terry Gentry. Partly as a result of being under surveillance by MI5, he decided to defect to the Soviet Union in 1934. In his memoirs he claims to have done so on the advice of Harry Pollitt the General Secretary of the British Communist Party, who reportedly assured him that it was only a matter of time till the whole world became Communist, and that he was lucky to jump the queue.

== In the Soviet Union ==
In the Soviet Union, Wincott was given the status of a hero and received VIP treatment. Soviet propaganda elevated him to a symbol of the British working class, struggling for their rights. He settled in Leningrad where he joined the Anglo-American section of the International Seamen's Club. His job here was to indoctrinate Western crew members on shore leave into the virtues of Communism. During the Second World War he survived through the nearly 900 days Siege of Leningrad, but shortly after the war his luck ran out.

In 1946, he was accused of being a British spy and duly arrested by the NKVD. After a show trial he was sentenced to a long term in the Gulag. At one time he was in the same labour camp as Victor Louis. After spending nearly eleven years in labour camps he was rehabilitated during the onset of Nikita Khrushchev's de-Stalinisation campaign in 1956. After his release, he became a friend of Donald Maclean and contributed articles for the Anglo-Soviet Friendship Society magazine. He was met by Lt Cdr Dairmid Gunn, RN, who was Naval Attache to the USSR in 1966 and noted that Wincott was "gazing wistfully at the White Ensign. Fearing arrest, however, he refused Gunn's invitation to come onboard HMS Devonshire. Gunn recalled that Wincott was very sad and, in a mixture of Russian and rusty English, just wanted to talk about good old times in the Royal Navy prewar and postwar."

Apart from a visit to England in 1974 Wincott spent the rest of his life in the Soviet Union. He met and married his fourth wife in the Gulag and he died in Moscow in January 1983. According to his last wishes, his ashes were scattered over Devonport Harbour.

== Sources ==
- Len Wincott, Invergordon Mutineer, Weidenfeld, London 1974 – memoirs
- Alan Ereira, The Invergordon Mutiny, Routledge, London 1981 – popular account of the mutiny by a BBC producer
- John Miller, All Them Cornfields and Ballet in the Evenings, Hodgson Press, London, 2010 – autobiography
- "Naval mutineer", Memoirs held at Churchill Archives Centre
