= Fred Copeman =

English volunteer in the International Brigades during the Spanish Civil War

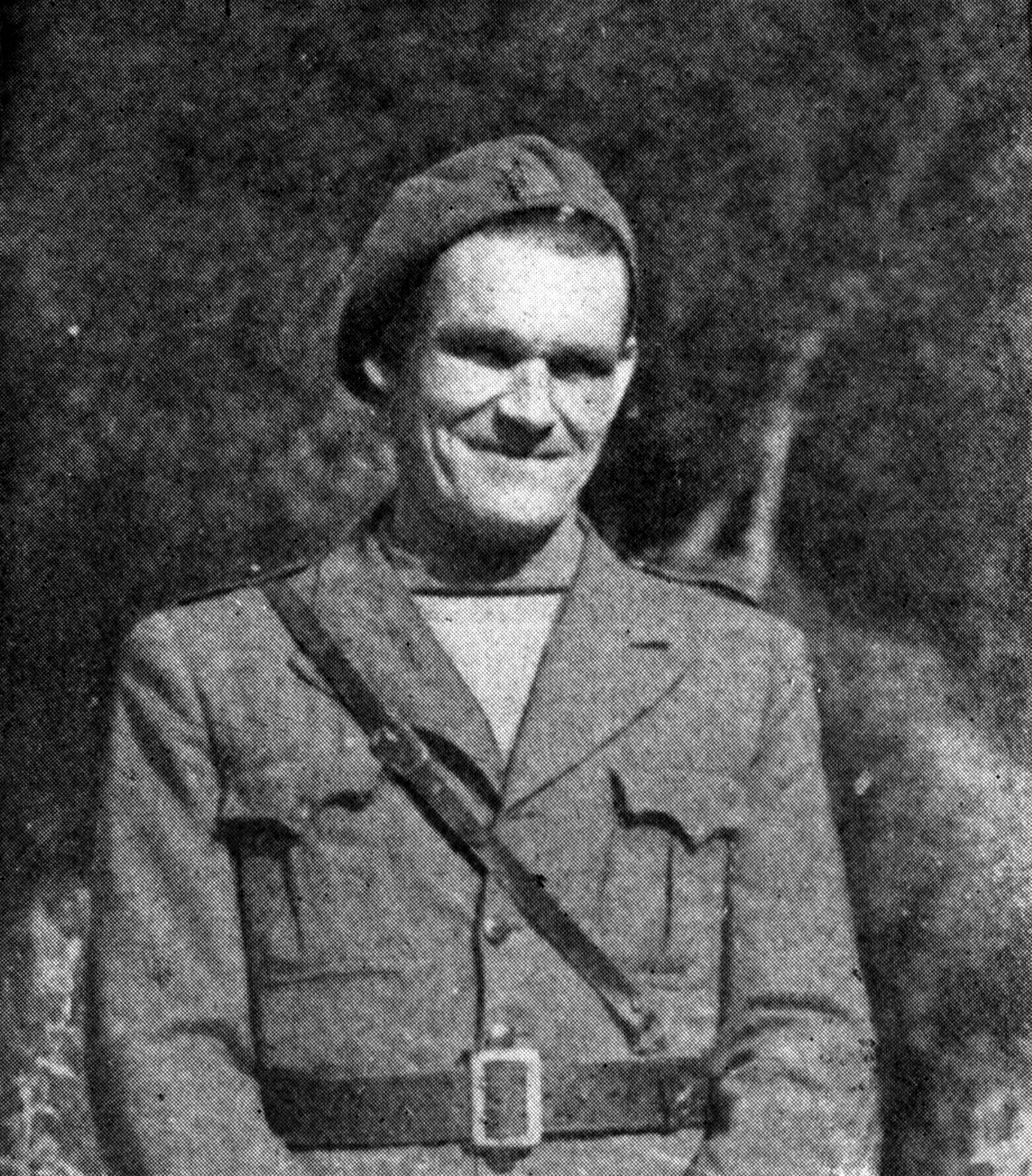
- Copeman in Spain c. 1936–1938
- Born: 1907; Beccles, Suffolk, England
- Died: 1983 (aged 75–76); London, England
- Military career
- Allegiance: United Kingdom (Spain) Second Spanish Republic
- Branch: Royal Navy; International Brigades
- Service years: 1921–1931 (Royal Navy); 1936–1939 (International Brigades)
- Rank: Able Seaman; Commandante
- Commands: British Battalion
- Conflicts: Spanish Civil War; Battle of Jarama (WIA); Battle of Teruel
- Awards: Officer of the Order of the British Empire

Frederick Bayes Copeman OBE (1907–1983) was an English volunteer in the International Brigades during the Spanish Civil War, commanding the British Battalion. He is also notable for contributing to London's air raid defences during the Second World War.

== Childhood ==
Fred Copeman was born in the Wangford Union Workhouse near Beccles in East Suffolk, England, in 1907. His mother and brother, George, were also residents. Initially, the Copeman brothers were the only children in the workhouse but, in 1916, Fred (aged nine) and George were moved from the workhouse to the Children's Home in Ravensmere Road, Beccles. It was here that Copeman befriended his first dog, a stray he called "Bonnie". Shortly, afterwards, George was sent to Canada to make a fresh start by the children's charity, Barnardo's, and Fred "never saw nor heard of him [again]".

== Training ==
The focus of care at the time was to make boys swiftly self-sufficient and so, aged 12, Copeman was sent to Watts Naval School at North Elmham, Norfolk, to prepare for a life at sea. After two years, he was duly enlisted in the Royal Navy and was sent to HMS Ganges, an onshore naval training base near Shotley in Suffolk. HMS Ganges had a mixed reputation in the Royal Navy, both for its reputed harsh methods of training boys in order to turn out professionally able, self-reliant ratings and for the professionalism of its former trainees. From HMS Ganges, Copeman was sent to the Mediterranean Fleet, which was based in Malta. The poverty of the Maltese had a profound impression on him. It was here that he learned to box, earning money as a heavyweight prizefighter. He also narrowly missed the chance to become an officer, spending three weeks in Malta's Corradina prison for "a practical joke" that went wrong.

== Invergordon Mutiny, September 1931 ==
In September 1931, as part of its attempts to deal with the Great Depression, the new National Government launched cuts to public spending. Navy spending cuts were translated into a 10% pay cut (matching 10% cuts across the board for public sector workers). However, the cuts were not applied equally to all ranks. Sailors of the Atlantic Fleet, arriving at Invergordon (on the Cromarty Firth in Scotland) in the afternoon of Friday 11 September, learned about the cuts from newspaper reports. Copeman – then a 24-year-old able seaman serving on HMS Norfolk – succinctly describes the causes of the mutiny:

It came... as a complete surprise when newspapers were read throughout the ships, indicating that in most cases the lower ranks would lose more than the senior ranks. The actual [pay] reductions were: – Admiral, 7 per cent; Lieut. Commdr., 3.7 per cent; Chief Petty Officer, 11.8 per cent; and Able Seaman, 23 per cent.

The mutiny lasted two days (15–16 September 1931). Copeman, with another able seaman – Len Wincott – became a member of the Norfolk's strike committee. Although the mutiny was entirely peaceful, the Royal Navy imprisoned dozens of the ringleaders and dismissed hundreds more, Copeman among them. In Crusade in Spain, Jason Gurney notes that Copeman was not charged, suggesting that his role must have been far more minor than the leader he presented himself to have been. Alan Ereira says that Copeman was one of the eight ringleaders "hustled outside the dockyard gates with 13 s[hillings] and a railway warrant". According to Ereira, "Some of the men were seen crying outside the dockyard at Devonport. They were reduced to beggary."

Copeman himself reflected on the event later:

[The mutiny] was a turning point ... I began to understand the meaning of leadership and – even more important – the meaning of politics. Although the mutiny was not, in the minds of those who took part in it, political, I could not fail to be affected politically by it. The Communist Party had not neglected to notice those who taken any leading part at Invergordon. Wincott immediately started work in the International Labour Defence, an organisation in the control of the Communist Party. Some months later, I myself linked up with it and both of us finally joined the Party itself. Most politicians are egoists and I more than most. At Invergordon, I had tasted leadership and felt the thrill of power, which came from the willing support of thousands of followers. The Party were quick to observe this and to draw me into active association with them. It was not long before I was in the thick of the political battle on their side and liking it.

== Union activist ==
Shortly after being discharged from the Royal Navy, Copeman became a member of the National Unemployed Workers' Movement. He organised pickets and demonstrations at Employment Exchanges and elsewhere. In 1933, he was imprisoned in Wandsworth Prison for two months for breaking a government ban on marches. He repeated the offence on being re-released, for which he was sentenced to a further three months, in Brixton Prison. A few months later, he was again arrested and imprisoned for four months, in Wormwood Scrubs, this time at hard labour.

== Spanish Civil War, 1936–1939 ==

Along with many other Communist Party members, Copeman decided to join the defence of the Second Spanish Republic. He left for Spain on 26 November 1936, where he joined the British Battalion of the International Brigades. At the Battle of Jarama, in February 1937, Copeman was wounded in the arm and head:

[T]he situation was further disturbed by a self-appointed commander... Fred Copeman, that great bull of a man, clearly visualised himself as a divinely-appointed leader by virtue of his immense strength – he had been a heavy-weight boxer in the Navy – although he was almost illiterate. Throughout his life he had used his fists to put himself in charge of any group of men he found himself among. He was completely without physical fear and seemed almost entirely indifferent to physical injury. On this occasion, ... [he] received at least two wounds, one in the hand and the other head, which had been roughly tied up with field dressings. By this time, he was more or less insane, giving completely inconsequential orders to everybody in sight, and offering to bash their faces in if they did not comply. Fortunately, he passed out at this stage and was carted away to the rear.

Copeman made what appeared to be a complete recovery and, on his return to the battalion, became commander. Later, just before the Battle of Teruel, he nearly died of complications from his wound (a small piece of unremoved shrapnel became infected) and was invalided home permanently.

== World War II and after ==
The first thing Copeman did on return was to marry. This took place at Lewisham Register Office on 21 May 1938 and "some eleven hundred people" gathered for the wedding reception that night at St Pancras Town Hall.

However, in common with many returned volunteers, Copeman was disenchanted by what he had seen in Spain. As a member of the Executive Committee of the Communist Party, he was invited to visit the Kremlin, where he met Dolores Ibárruri, better known as La Pasionara. He was disillusioned by what he saw and, following a fist-fight, left the Communist Party shortly afterwards.

On his return to England in 1938, he converted to Moral Rearmament, and then to the Catholic Church, and in both he was for a short time a prize exhibit as a converted Communist. He later wrote a book which is a farrago of nonsense and self-aggrandisement.

Copeman was closely monitored by the British Security Service MI5 for years.

One note in the file, written by his commander, describes Copeman as "one of these fiery people, who will shout about everything". The officer draws special attention to the fact that Copeman was once heard "singing the Red Flag in the streets of Devonport".

Nevertheless, when the Second World War came "he was to play a significant role in organising civilian protection against German air-raids in London and was decorated".

In June 1940, shortly after the government had affirmed that it would not make evacuation compulsory, Copeman spoke at a meeting of the National Baby Welfare Council. He referenced his experiences in Spain to argue that the state should make evacuation compulsory:

['In Spain I witnessed] Hitler bombing towns which [were] being evacuated and I … said to myself over and over again, "If only these people had gone when they had the chance" … If you depend on sentiment and rely on the mothers to send their children away you will get nowhere – naturally they will not be parted from their children if they can help it. But if it is made compulsory, mothers after the first raid will bless those who send their children away.

During the conflict, Copeman served as manager of the deep tube shelters. In this capacity, he gave several lectures to the Royal Household at Buckingham Palace. For this service, he was appointed Officer of the Order of the British Empire (OBE) in the 1946 New Year Honours. Shortly afterwards, he was received into the Roman Catholic church.

He remained active in politics, though over the years he mellowed. He became a "popular Trades Union organiser" and a Labour Party councillor on Lewisham Borough Council. He stood unsuccessfully for Lewisham North at the 1949 London County Council election, and the equivalent parliamentary constituency at the 1950 UK general election.

Copeman and his wife, Kitty, had four children. He died in London in 1983.

== Works ==
- Reason in Revolt. London: Blandford Press, London, 1948. —autobiography
