= Villanueva del Pardillo =

Coordinates: 40°29′N 3°58′W

- Municipality
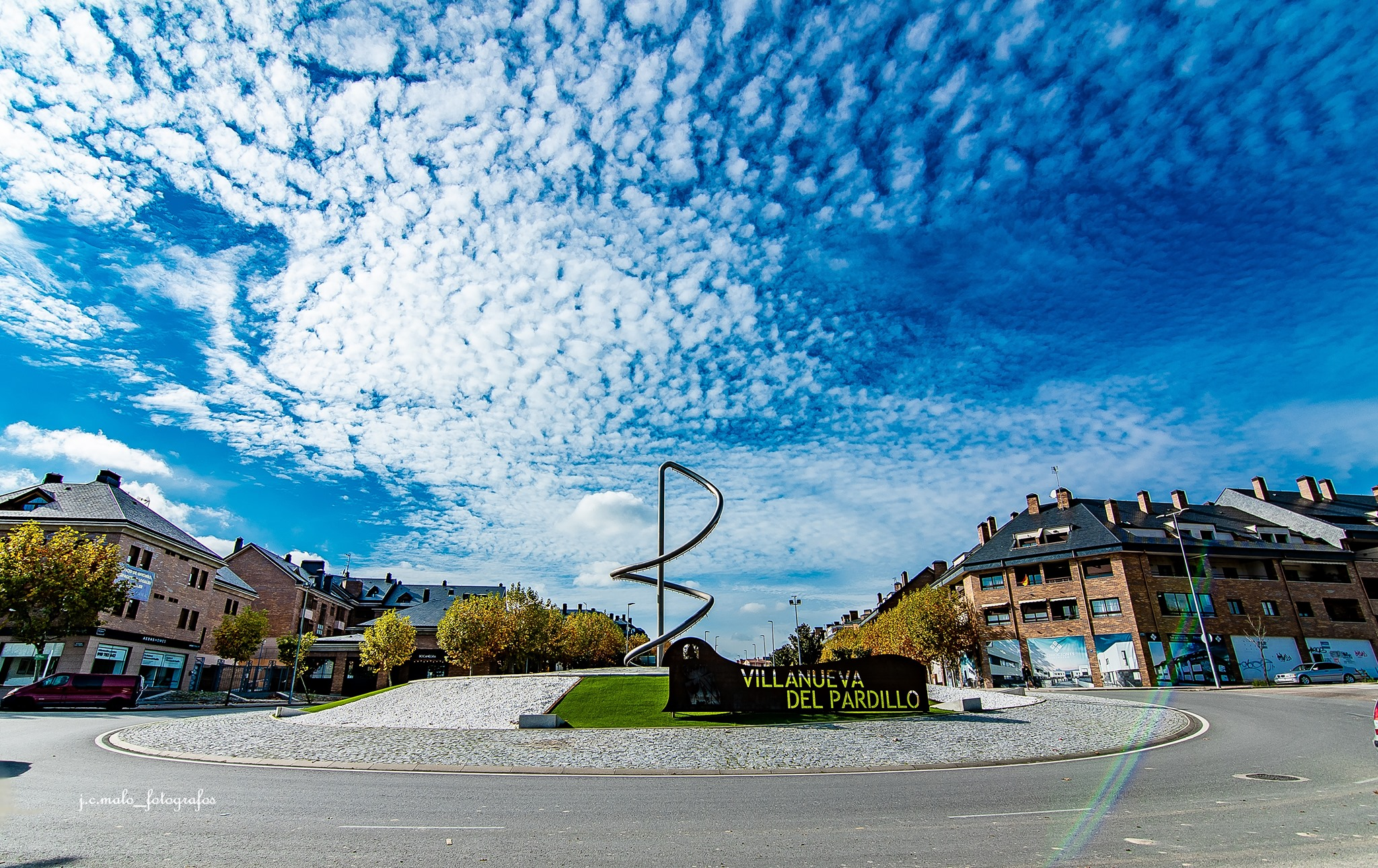

- Flag Coat of arms

- Municipal location within the Community of Madrid.
- Country: Spain
- Autonomous community: Community of Madrid

Government
  - Type: Mayor–council
  - Body: Ayuntamiento de Villanueva del Pardillo
  - Mayor: Eduardo Fernández (Partido Local)

Area
  - Total: 9.79 sq mi (25.35 km^{2})
- Elevation: 2,130 ft (650 m)

Population (2025-01-01)
  - Total: 18,466
- Demonym(s): pardillano (m), pardillana (f)
- Time zone: UTC+1 (CET)
  - Summer (DST): UTC+2 (CEST)
- Postal codes in Spain: 28229
- Area code: 34 (Spain) + 91 (Madrid)
- Patron Saint: San Lucas
- Patron Saint: Virgen del Soto
- Website: vvapardillo.org
- Twinned with Luisant and Chions

Villanueva del Pardillo is a municipality and Spanish town of the Community of Madrid, situated 26 kilometers from the capital of Spain and nestled in the natural environment of the Cuenca del Guadarrama. It borders the municipalities of Majadahonda, Las Rozas de Madrid, Villanueva de la Cañada, Galapagar, Colmenarejo and Valdemorillo. The municipality combines a peaceful natural environment with proximity to the capital. Much of its municipal territory is integrated into this protected natural area, a protected natural space that covers more than 60% of the municipal territory. The town has cultural, sports and festive activities, as well as the preservation of its popular traditions.

== Geography ==
The municipality of Villanueva del Pardillo is located in the central part of the community of Madrid, west of the capital of the community and the state. It is also located in the middle basin of the river Guadarrama, at an altitude of 650 m. The municipal border of Villanueva del Pardillo, concludes in the river Guadarrama east of the municipality.

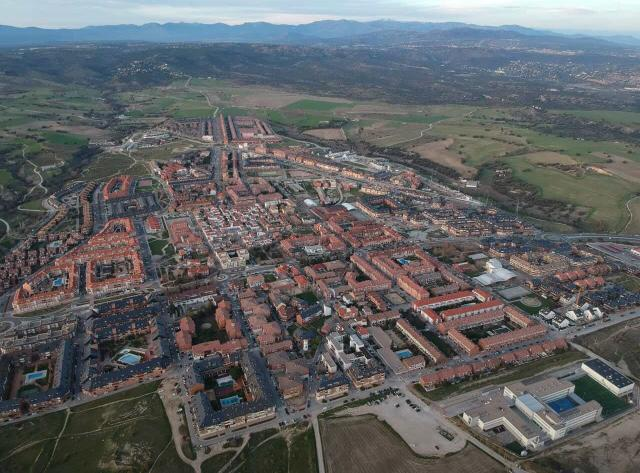
Aerial view of Villanueva del Pardillo

=== Population nuclei ===
- Urban area: It is the main area of the municipality, where you will find the Town Hall, schools, local police offices, the cultural center, a sports center and the public library. It consists mainly of mostly flats and some area of villas.
- Urbanization Santa María: Located 1 km east of the urban area and composed mainly of single-family villas. In addition to housing there is a nursery.
- Urbanization Las Vegas: Located 2 km east of the urban area and composed mainly of detached houses and some housing. Until 2006 it was considered rustic soil and in this same year the area was paved, becoming considered urban soil. Also at the end of the urbanization can be found a recycling ship of paper.
- Los Pinos: Located on the outskirts, less than 1 km, where you can find the Juan Manuel Angelina Municipal Football Field, the Medinaceli nursing home, the Sapere Aude High School and the Los Pinos Municipal Swimming Pool.

Other areas

- Aulencia Business Park, on the road M-509 to Villanueva de la Cañada.
- Priégola Farm.

== Nature ==
Regional Park of the Middle Course of the Guadarrama River and its environment

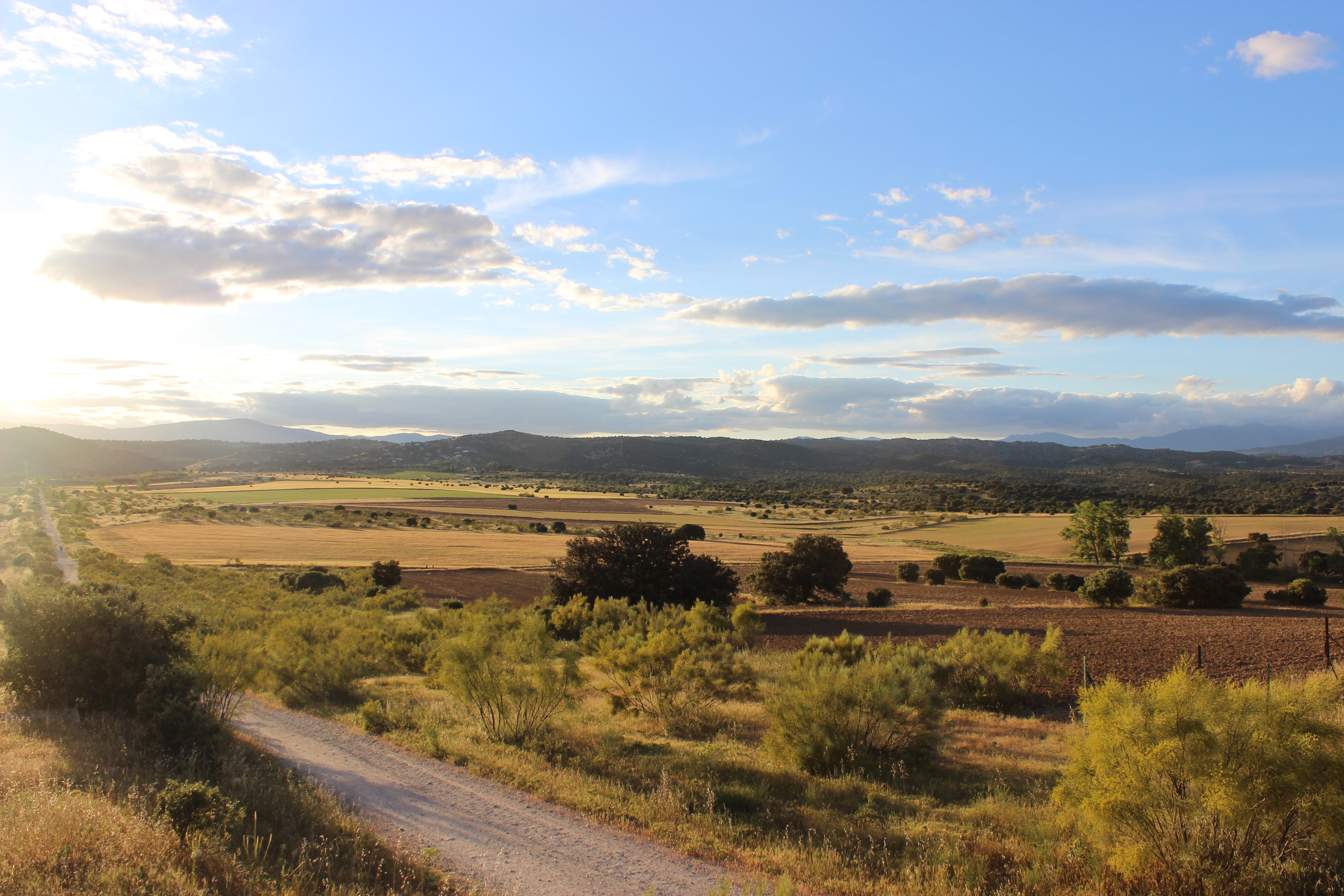
Surroundings of Villanueva de Pardillo

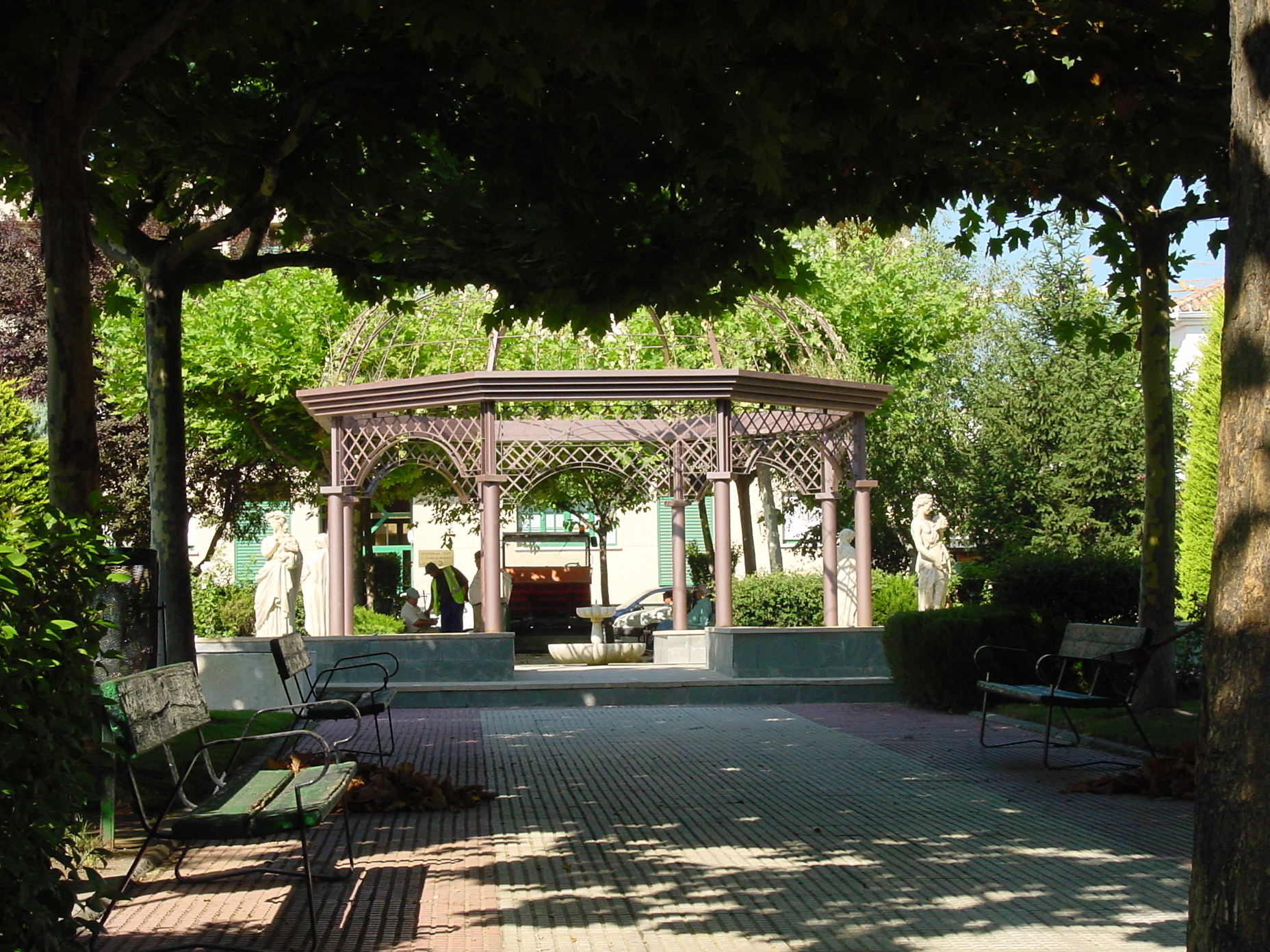
Rosalía de Castro Park in the center of town

The Regional Park of the Middle Course of the Guadarrama River and its environment is a natural area of great environmental diversity that extends from the base of the Sierra de Guadarrama to the countryside of the Tagus depression, following the course of the Guadarrama and Aulencia rivers.

The public use of the Natural Spaces is one of the basic pillars in its management, and encompasses the set of activities related to recreation, culture and education that are developed in it. From this area the fundamental objective is to make known the natural values of the Park so that visitors value and respect it. For this purpose there are different proposals and a wide network of rural paths and roads, traditionally used for agricultural and forestry use, which also facilitates the connection between different urban centers.

There are also recreational areas, which have informative and interpretive signage, in addition to providing parking to vehicles, to allow visitors to enjoy and know this unique Natural Space. In addition, environmental education programs are developed with the aim of actively involving the residents of the Park in its conservation through leisure and recreation. Also from this same area are directed studies on historical heritage, which consist mainly in the realization of inventories of existing heritage elements in the Park.

== Municipal symbols ==
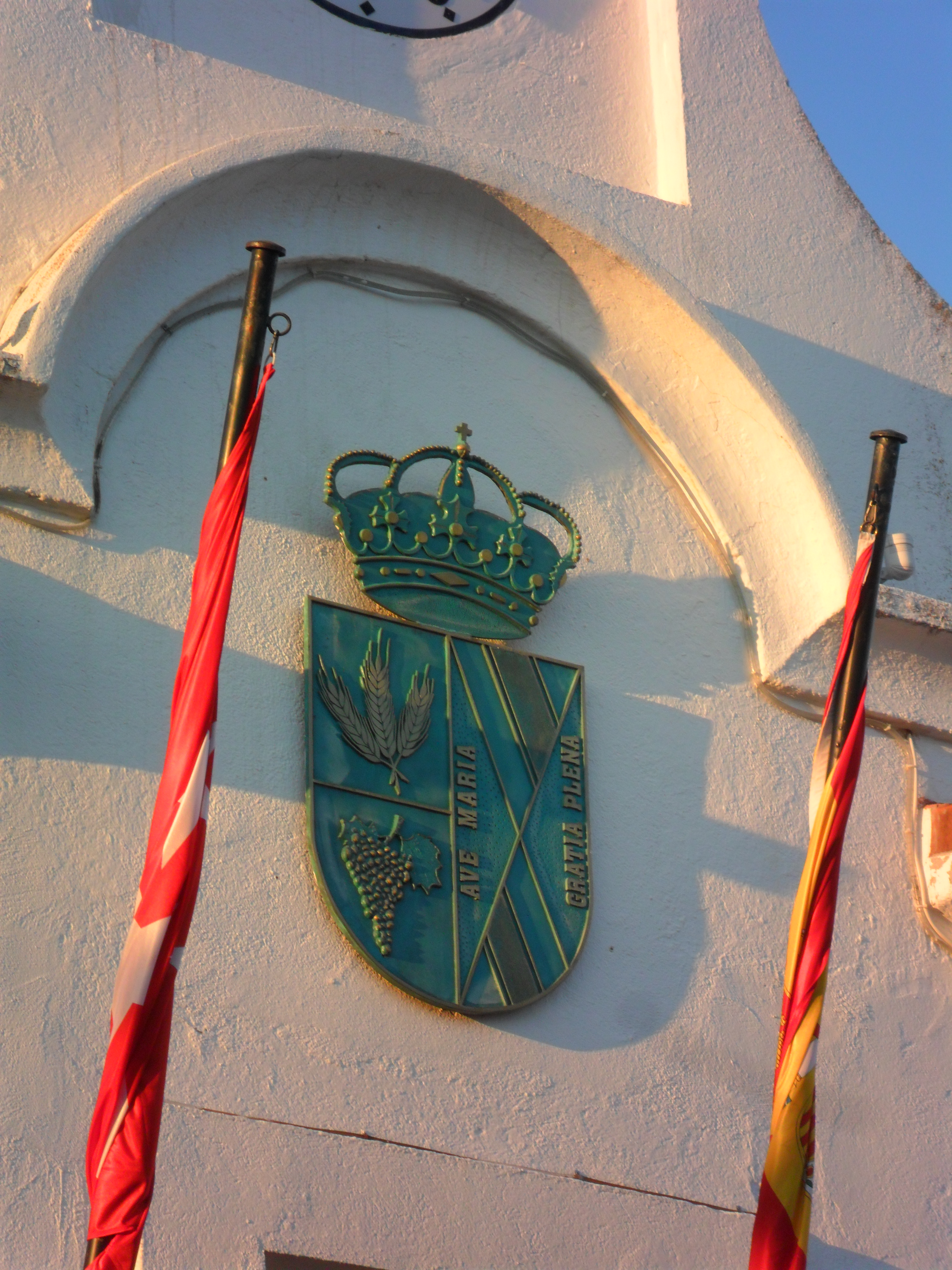
Detail of the shield of the municipality on the facade of the Town Hall

On November 7, 1997, in the Boletín Oficial del Estado, the agreement to officially affix the coat of arms and the flag of the municipality was published. The descriptions are as follows:

Municipal Coat

«Split. 1 Cut: A azure, three golden wheat ears in sickle. B of silver, a bunch of grapes to the natural; 2 in sotuer a and c of sinople a band of gules filleted of gold, b and d of gold with the legend Ave María Gratia Plena. Spanish Royal Crown Stamp».

Flag

«Of proportion 2:3. Yellow cloth of equal. Situated to the center the Municipal Coat.».

== Municipal politic ==
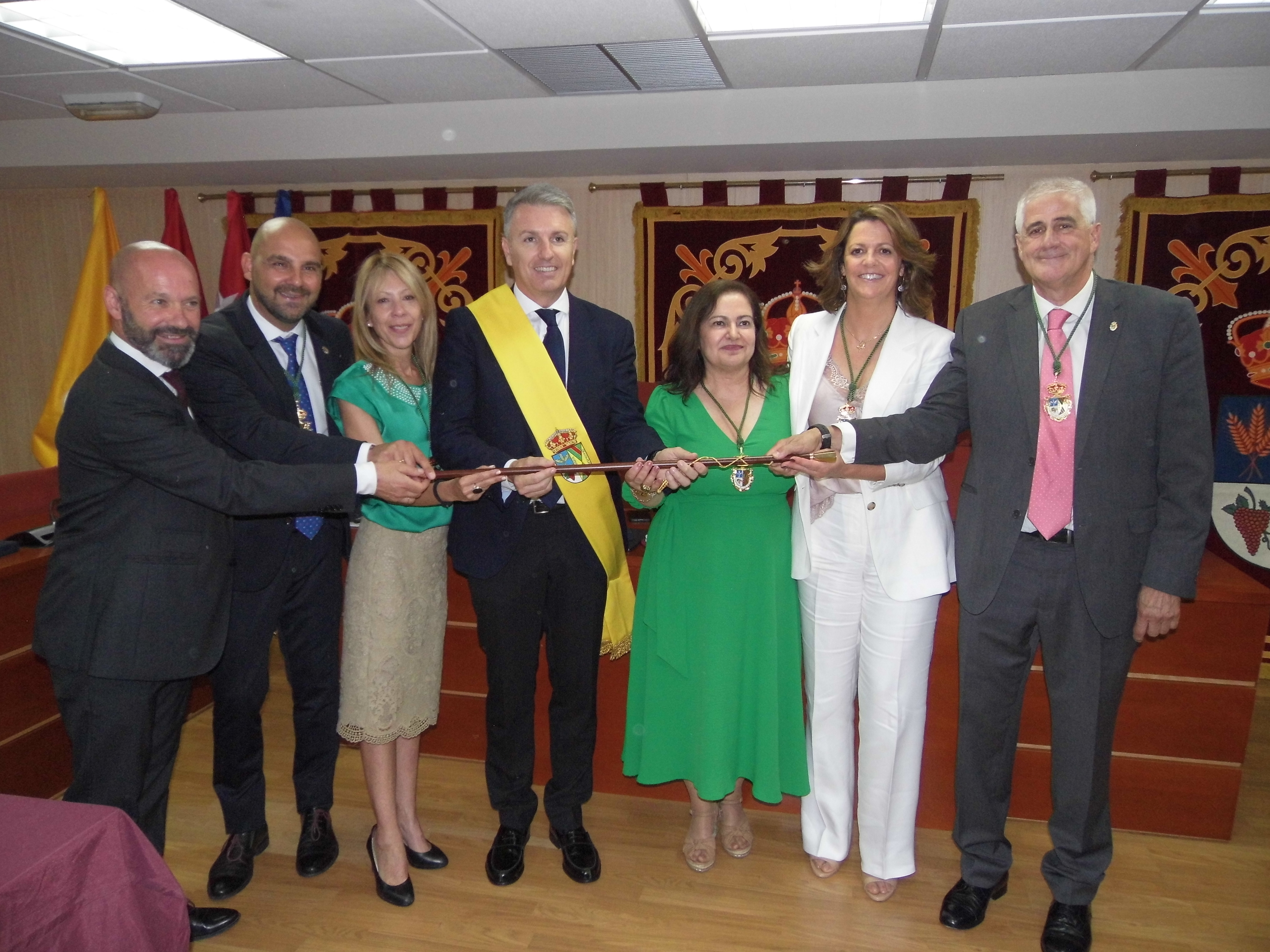
Goberment of Villanueva del Pardillo

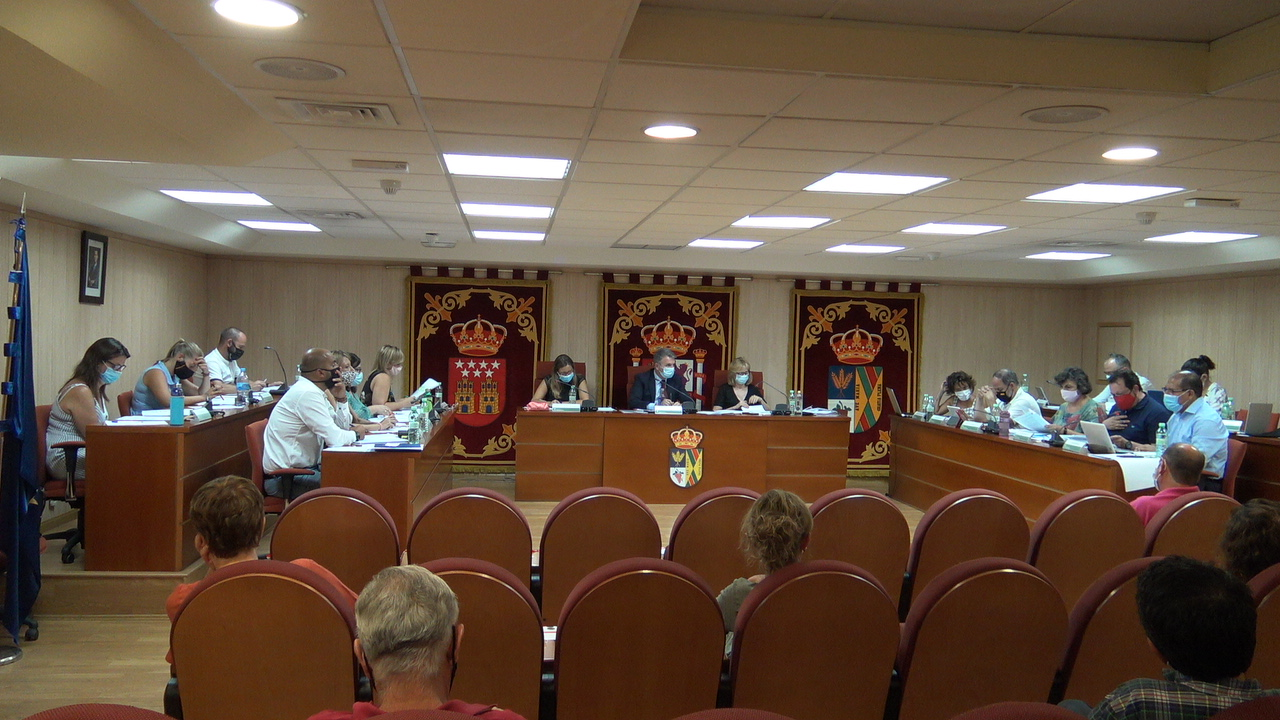
Plenary hall of Villanueva del Pardillo

Villanueva del Pardillo's Town Hall is represented by 17 councillors, elected by universal suffrage every four years. The municipal council is chaired by the mayor and operates in plenary sessions and through commissions.

The current distribution of the councillors, after the municipal elections held in May 2023, is as follows:

Town Hall of Villanueva del Pardillo 2023-2027
| Political parties | Councillors |
| Partido Local (PLVP) | 7 |
| PP | 6 |
| Vox | 2 |
| PSOE | 2 |

=== Mayors of Villanueva del Pardillo since Spanish transition ===
Since 2019, the mayor of Villanueva del Pardillo is Eduardo Fernández Navarro of Partido Local and currently rules in minority with 7 councillors.

| Name | Portrait | Office started | Office ended | Party affiliation |
|---|---|---|---|---|
| Enrique González Palacios | | 5 May 1974 | 15 June 1991 (17 years, 21 days) | FET y de las JONS (1974-1979) Independent (1979-1987) PSOE (1987-1991) |
| Juan González Miramón | | 15 June 1991 | 13 June 2015 (23 years, 363 days) | PP |
| Luis Sosa Gayé | | 13 June 2015 | 15 June 2019 (4 years, 2 days) | Ciudadanos |
| Eduardo Fernández Navarro | | 15 June 2019 | Incumbent (7 years, 148 days) | Partido Local |

== Heritage ==
=== Regiones Devastadas Housing Plan ===
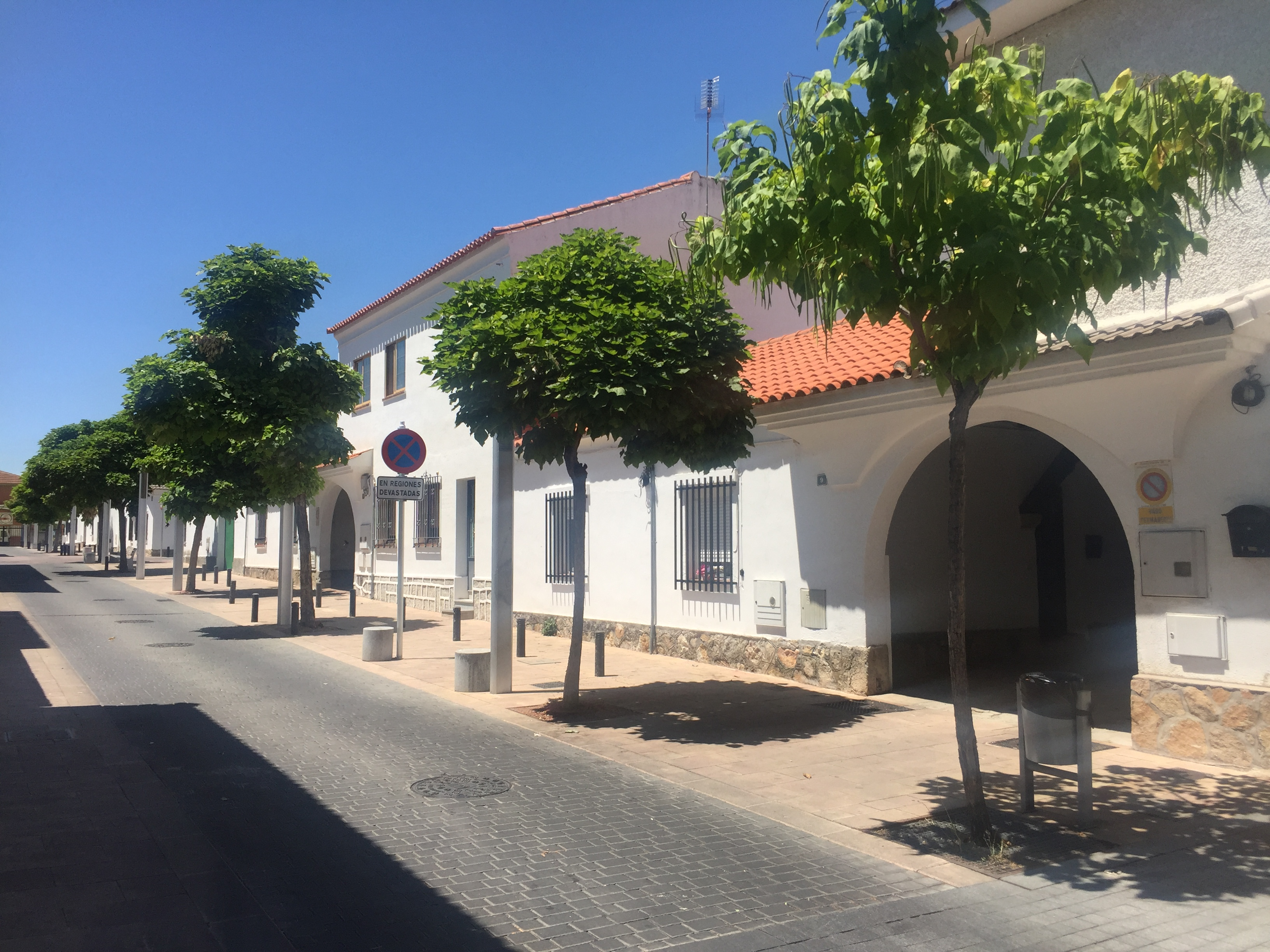
Cervantes Street

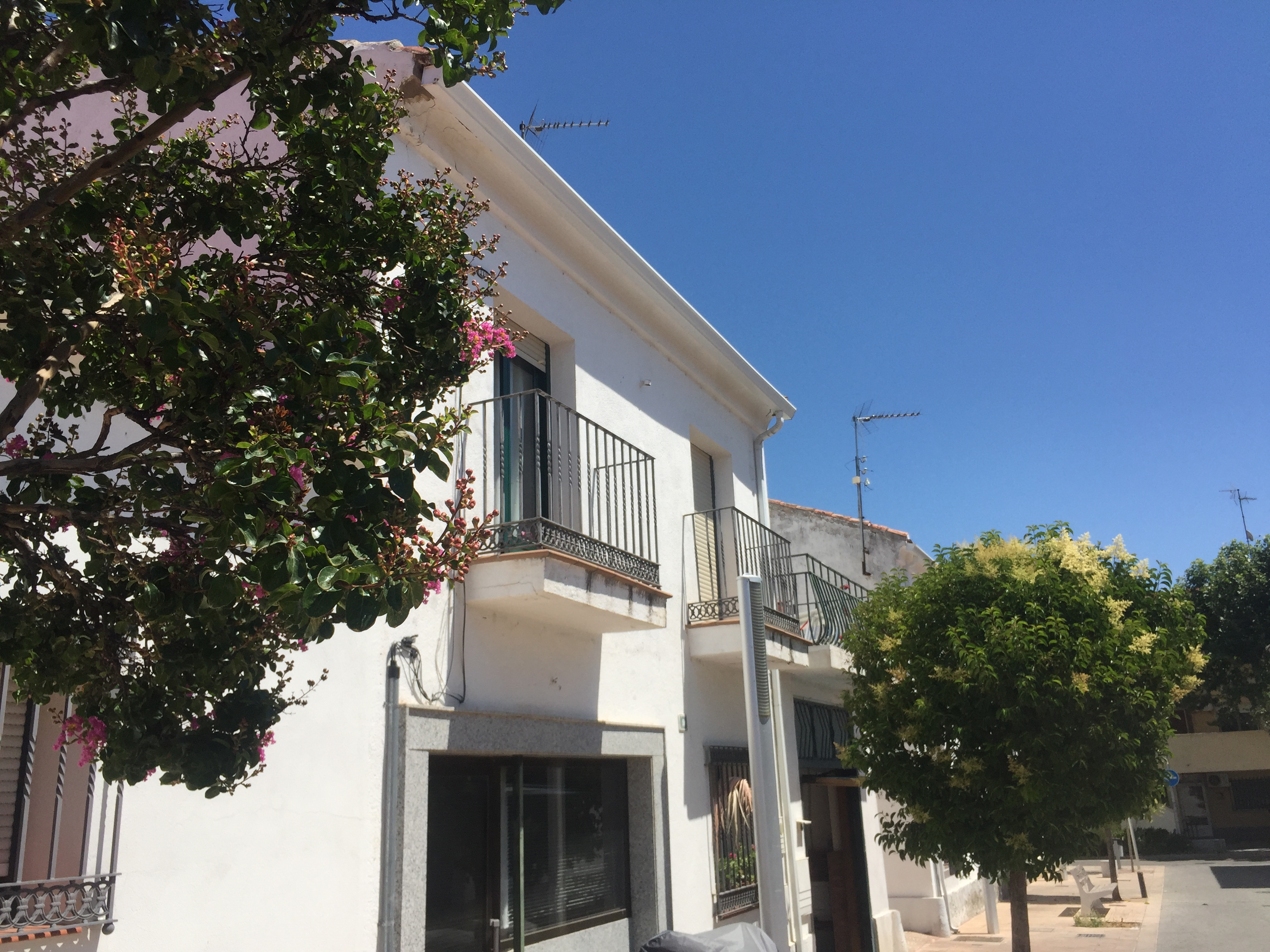
San Lucas Street

Set of blocks and houses developed after the Spanish Civil War in successive projects that basically responded to very austere programs inspired by the popular architecture of the agricultural character, with houses of one or two floors to the street. Overall it presents numerous interventions, although the town of Regions Devastated of Villanueva del Pardillo is probably the best preserved in the Community of Madrid.

=== House-museum of the Master ===
It is currently in the creation phase and aims to show the reality of rural housing from the 1940s that were built with the Plan of Devastated Regions after the Spanish Civil War.

=== La Casona ===
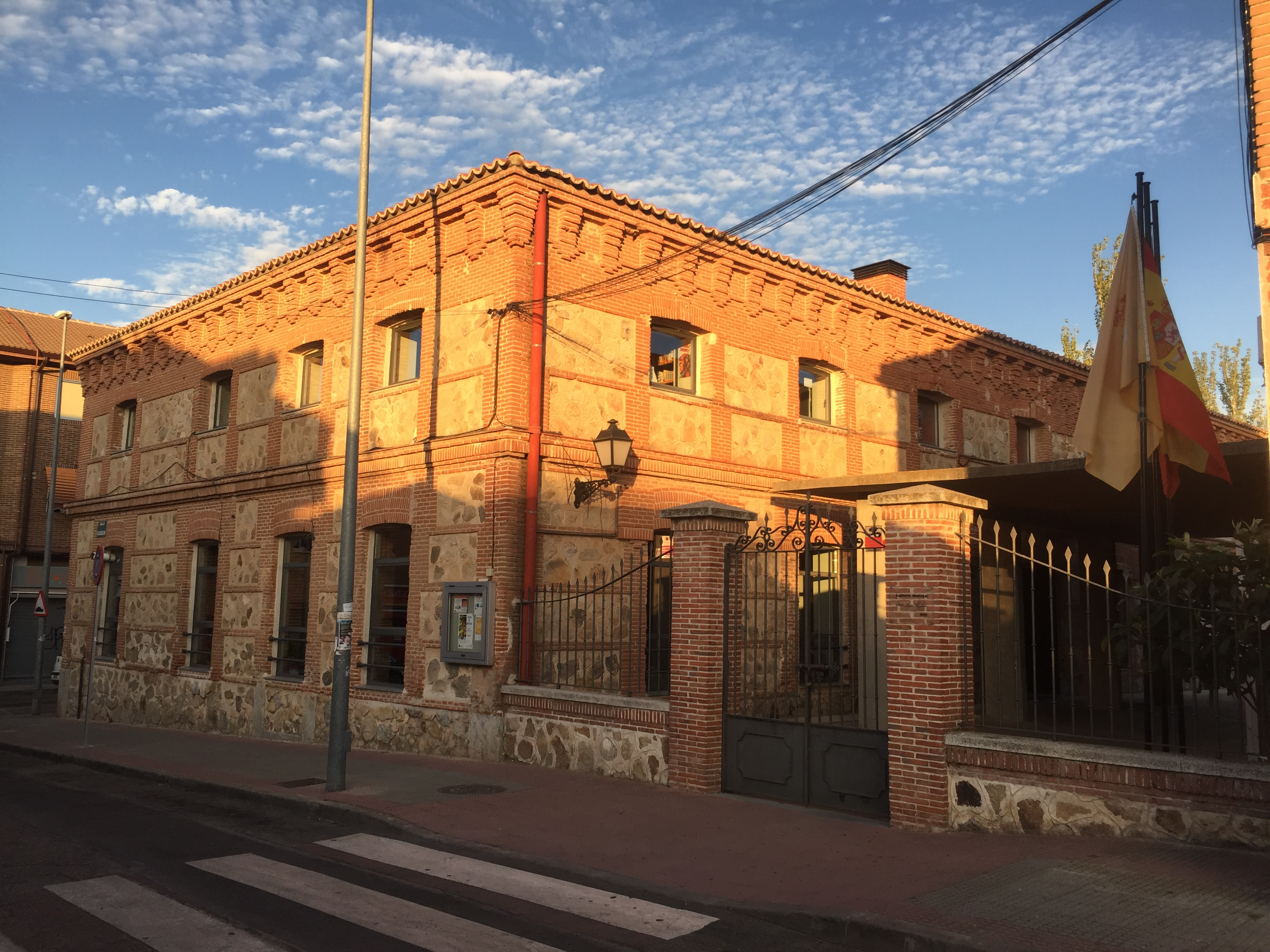
La Casona

The initial project dates from about 1900 but was rehabilitated from 1986 to 1989. At the end of the Civil War it was used as a refuge for all those citizens who had lost their home.

The ground floor of the Casona was used as a kitchen while the rooms were shared between several families. This building responds to a style of synthesis of historicist elements. The façades develop their walls in tongadas and verdugadas of Neo-mudéjar inspiration next to openings slightly arched with jambs and brick lintels. The set is a paradigmatic example of finisecular architecture.

Throughout the vicissitudes of its bicentennial history, the building has undergone important modifications of use, interior distribution and its roof, having been recently renovated and being in an excellent state of conservation. The "Casona" is located within protected elements established with a degree of structural protection and is also declared a cultural asset.

Over the years, this building has given the citizens of the municipality of Villanueva del Pardillo a huge service, from medical office, through Adult Education Center, to Cultural Center and Library since 1991. It is currently the Municipal Library of the municipality.

=== Plaza Mayor and Town Hall ===
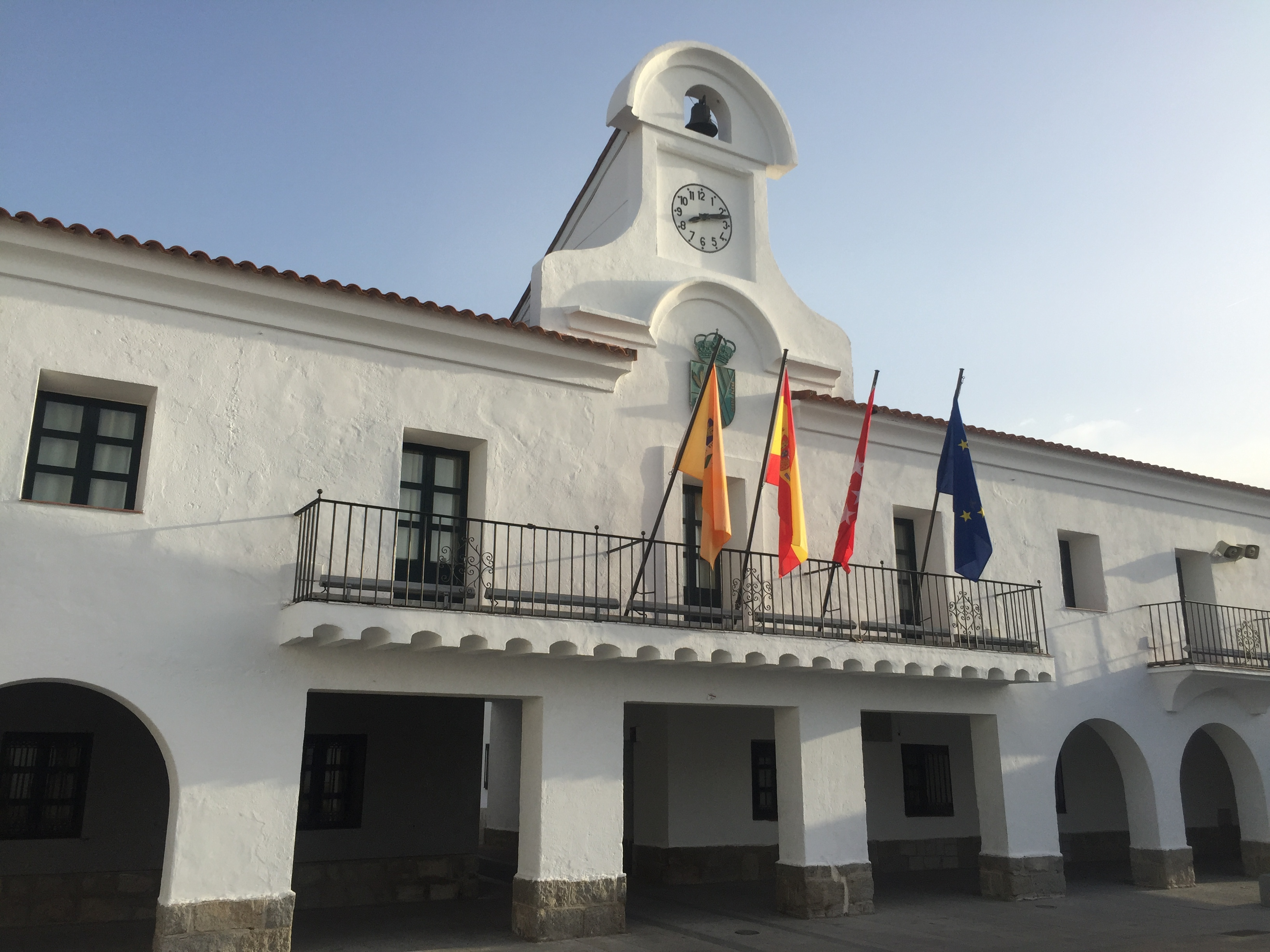
Town Hall situated in the Plaza Mayor

It constitutes the main nucleus of the buildings developed by the plan of Devastated Regions and responds to the traditional typology of Castilian square with arcades, central source and south orientation. Sensibly square has its main access at noon and two side entrances under arch. It is presided over by the Town Hall, recently enlarged at the back. The initial project dates from 1944 and the final one is from 1952. The ensemble is an attractive sample characteristic of Devastated Regions and of important citizen significance, also constituting the highest quality urban public space of Villanueva del Pardillo.

=== San Lucas Church ===
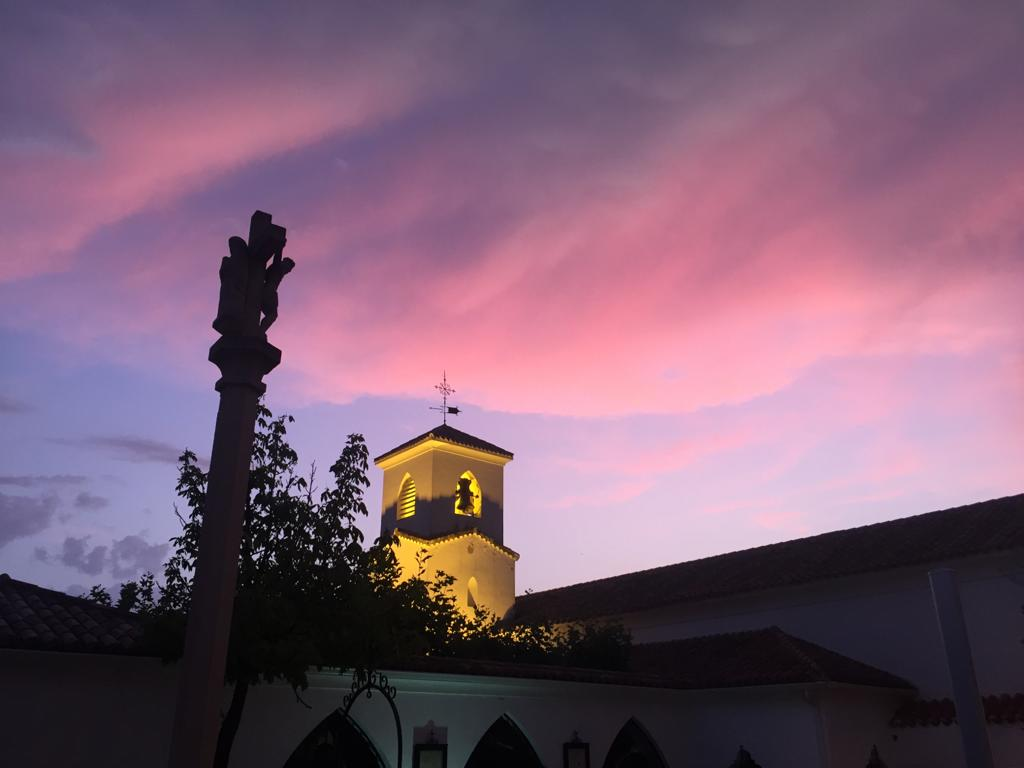
Old San Lucas Church

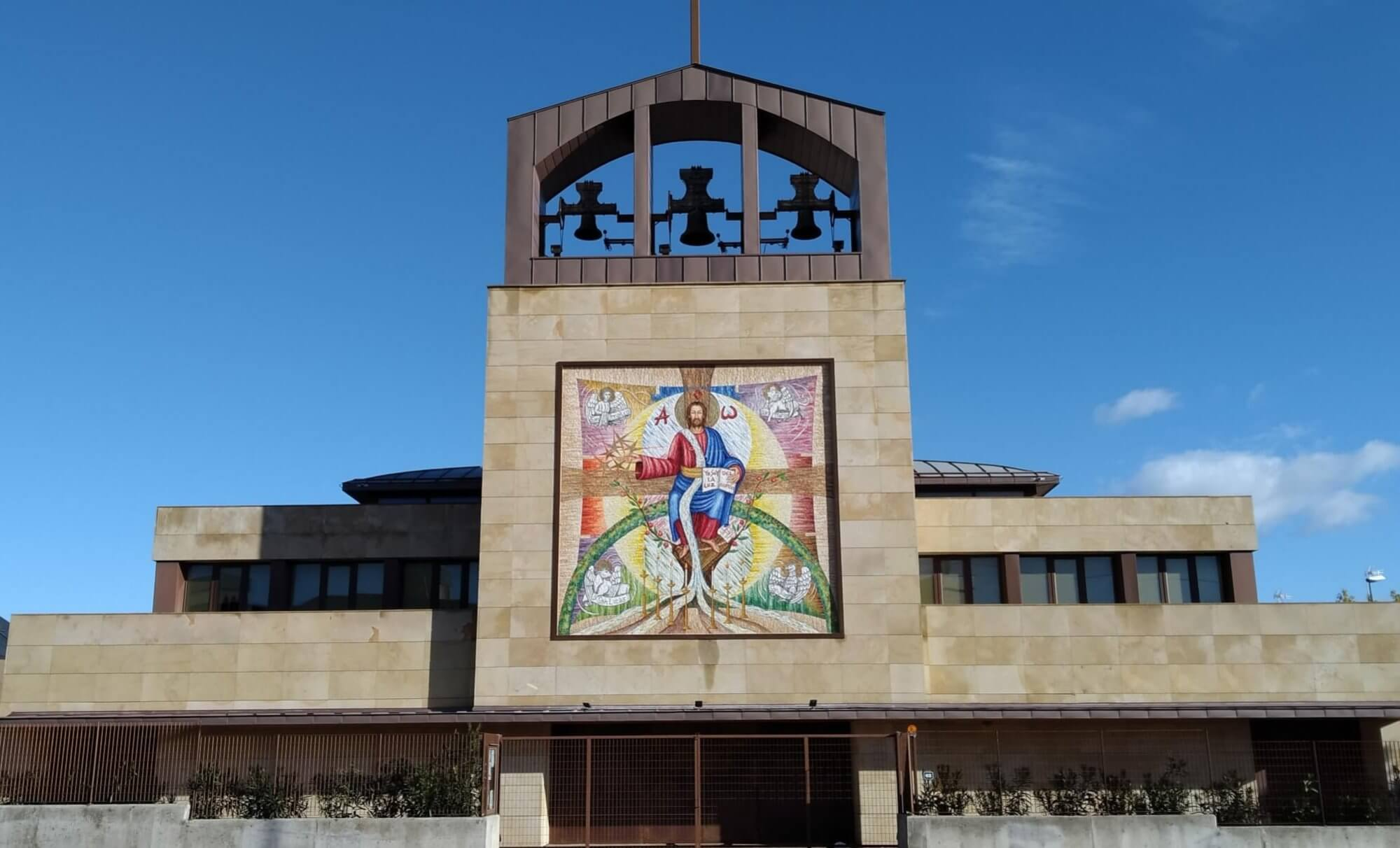
New San Lucas Church

It is in perfect condition as it was recently rehabilitated due to its significance as a town landmark and as a cultural asset. Included within the scope of reconstruction of Devastated Regions, this church (1943) develops a program of construction with silver in the form of "U", including the parish center, the rectory center and the catechesis around a cloister of ogive arches semi-open to a public square generated according to a perpendicular axis to the Town Hall. This square includes an original well.

The church is of a nave with gabled roof of Arabic tile on brick walls with buttresses and masonry plinth, completed with a square bell tower in the wing of the Gospel. The set represents an excellent example of the religious architecture of Devastated Regions and is in good condition.

=== Water Tower ===
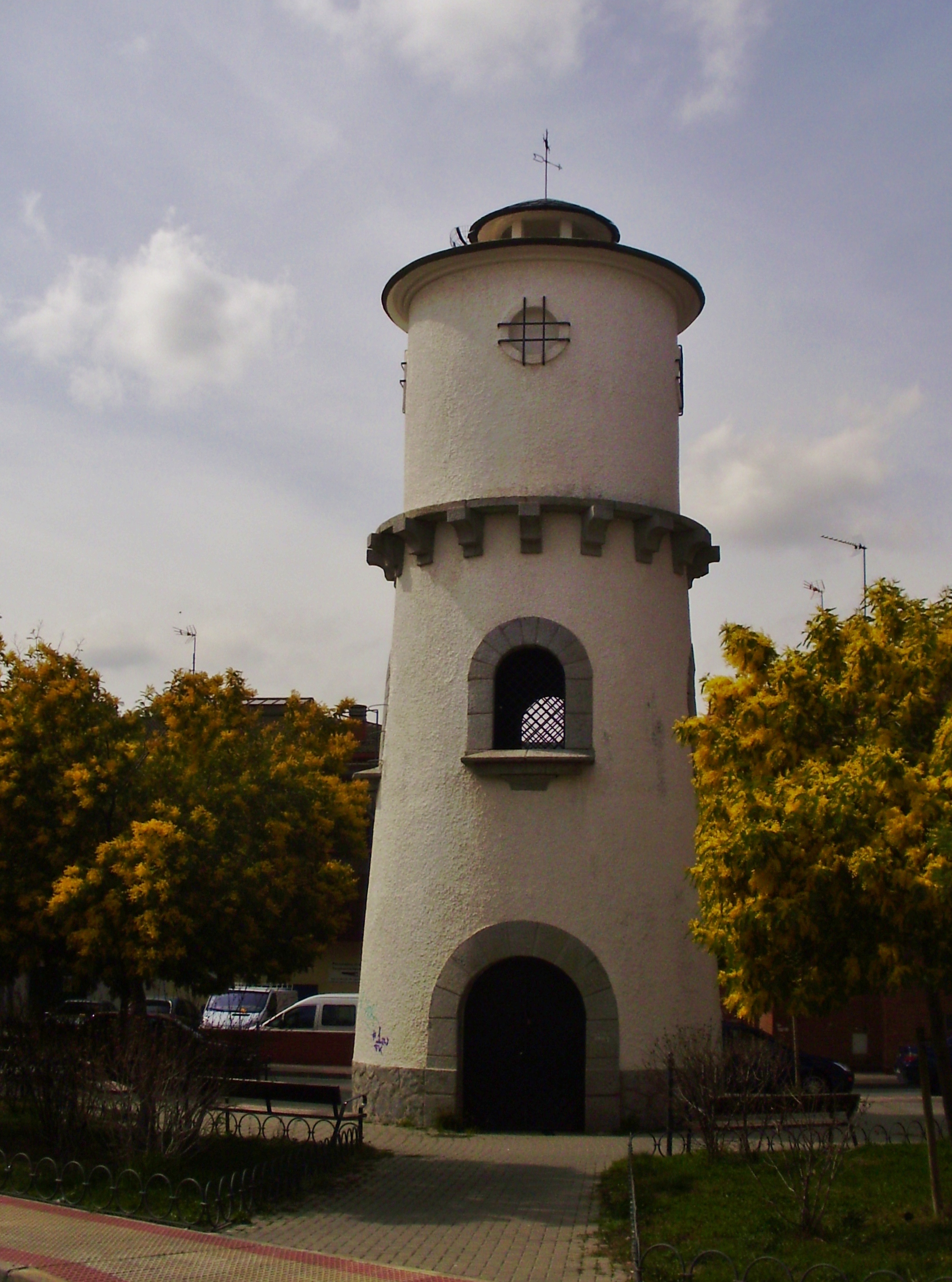
Old Water Tower

The water reservoir was one of the later projects under the Devastated Regions plan that completed the pooled water supply system known as "River Aulencia Waters." It is an example of public works architecture from the period.

=== Roman archaeological site Los Palacios ===
The archaeological site of the Roman period "Los Palacios" was identified in the Archaeological Charter of the Region of Madrid, elaborated in the years following the publication of the Historical Heritage Law 16/1985. Recent infrastructure projects (Canal de Isabel II Gestión) made possible the partial excavation of the site in 2013. With this presentation we show the value and importance of these excavated archaeological remains.

At the end of the century i d. C. in the environment of the stream of The Palace was built a Roman villa that lasted until the end of the century iv d. C. The Roman villa is a constructive design developed in the rural environment as a model of agricultural exploitation, in which besides being the residence of its owner had a series of buildings intended for the transformation of the different products collected in the environment.

This productive part of the village is called parsfructuaria and to it belong the buildings documented during the archaeological excavation. Inside this, it has been possible to identify a building that housed the complete installation of a press (torcularium) with all its defined spaces: a vineyard and storage of grapes (calcatorium), a pressing room, a pool of must (lacus)and the counterweight that made this ingenuity work.

The torcularium of Villanueva del Pardillo is, so far, the first and only documented building complete of these characteristics in the Region of Madrid.

Archaeology in addition to recovering ancient remains has to interpret the existing relationships between them and the environment in which they were produced. The furniture remains indicate us the eating habits, hygiene or technical level of production, among others. While the remains indicate other aspects such as the transformation of the landscape, politics, economy, urbanism or art. In short, through archaeology we try to identify and recognize each of the cultures that developed in our current territory.

== Local Festivities ==
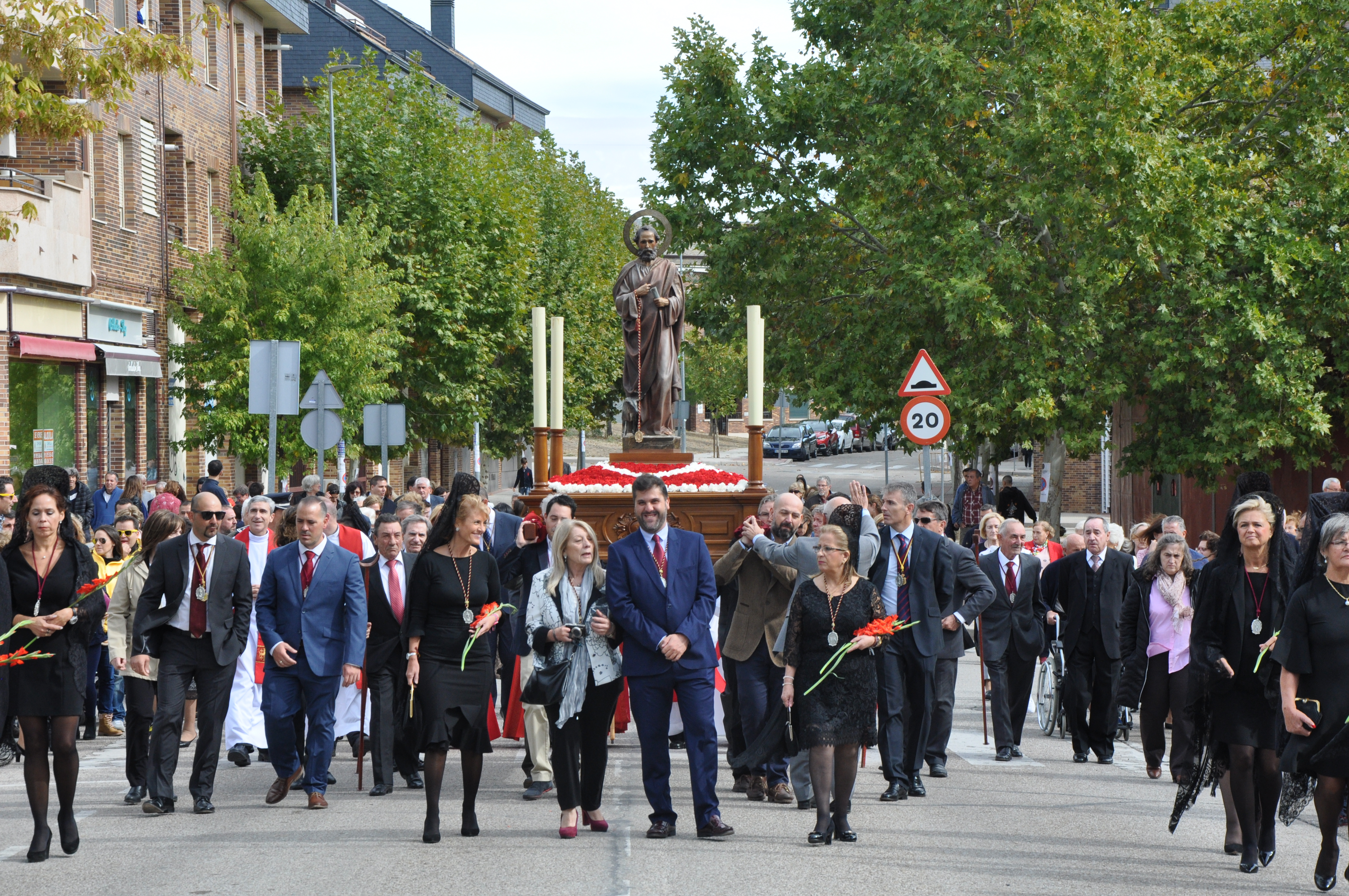
Procession in honour of San Lucas

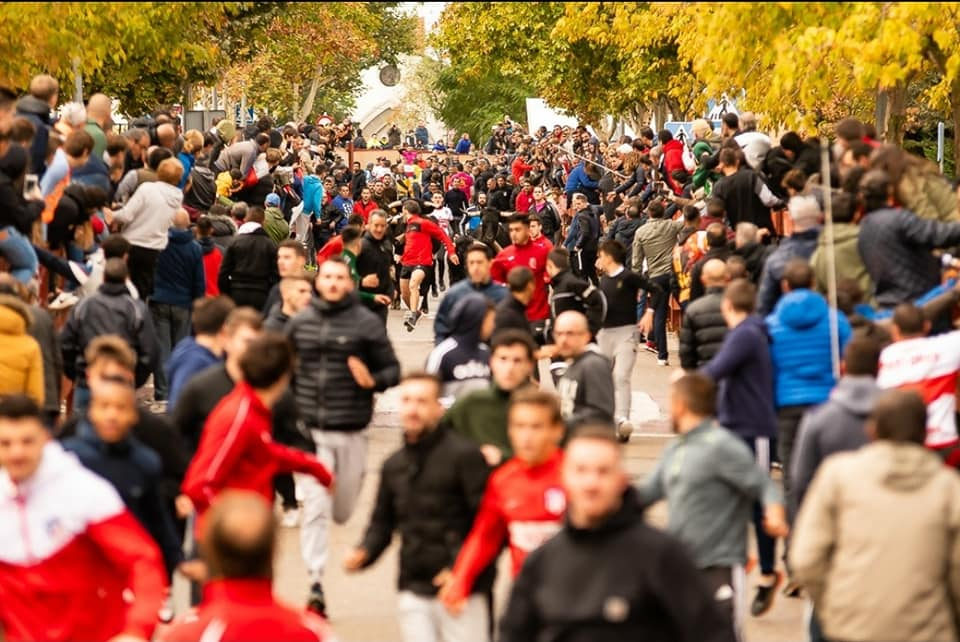
Traditional running of the bulls in Villanueva del Pardillo

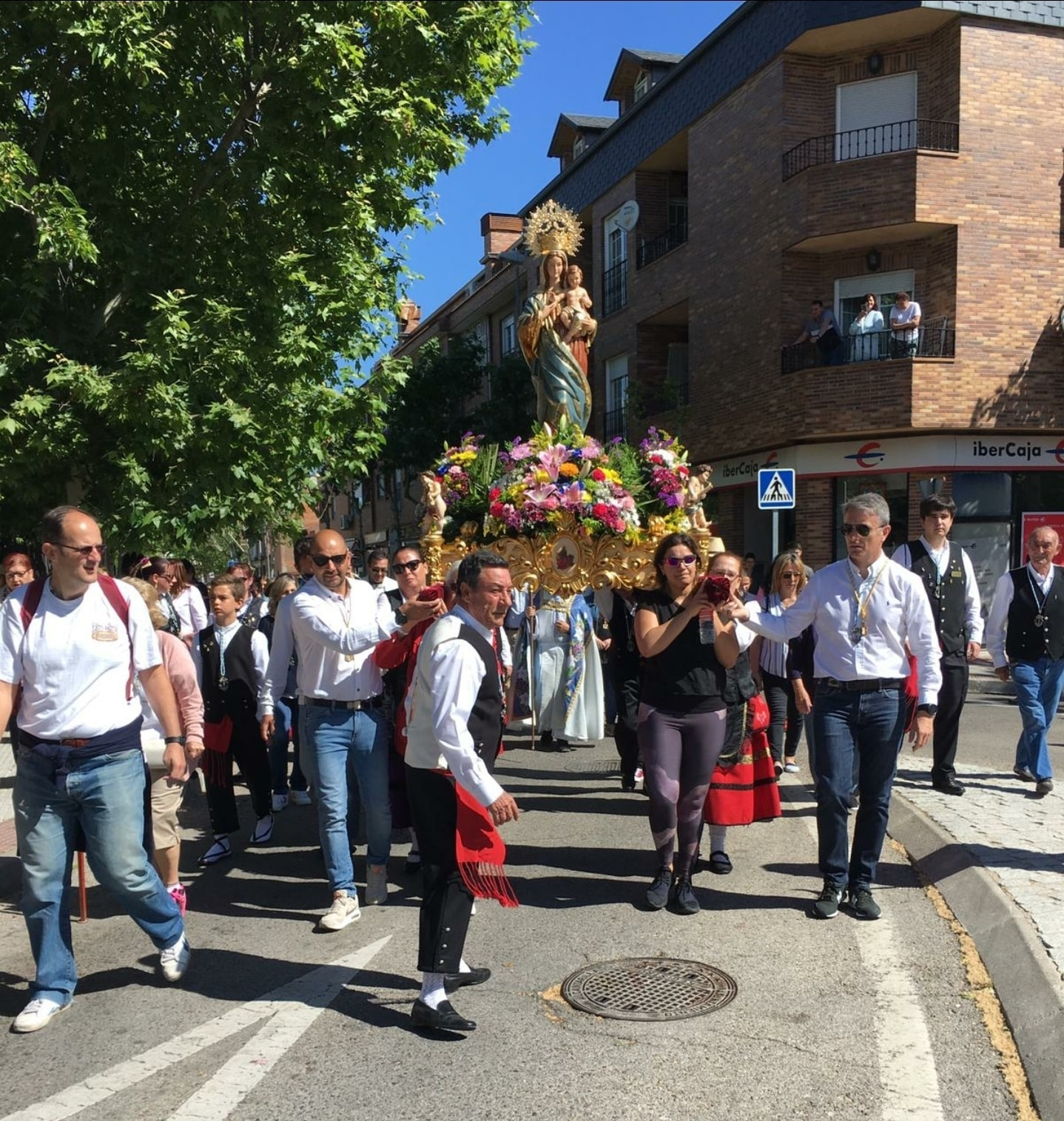
Procession in honour of Virgen del Soto

=== San Lucas Festivities ===
Celebrations in honor of the patron saint of the municipality San Lucas the Evangelist are held in mid-October around 18 October.

They begin with the preaching from the balcony of the City Hall, which gives way to the traditional caldereta, and pass between religious acts and a complete festive and cultural program. The program includes pyrotechnic shows, musical events, day and night sessions, as well as children’s, youth, cultural and sports activities, designed for all audiences.

To this are added the proposals organized by the peñas of the municipality, which fill the streets of the municipality with atmosphere, tradition and participation.

=== Virgen del Soto Pilgrimage ===
The third Sunday of May is celebrated the day of the Virgen del Soto, patron saint of Villanueva del Pardillo. Tradition imposes the procession with the Virgin to the place known as Fuente del Manchego, where the hermitage of the municipality is located. Religious events are accompanied by folk dances, musical performances, traditional games...

In 1995, the residents of Villanueva del Pardillo chose the future patroness of the town. And they did it in the most democratic way possible: by inserting in an urn a coupon with the name of the chosen virgin.

This is how the Virgen del Soto came out The initiative came from a group of local women who proposed to the mayor the idea of building a new hermitage to institutionalize a party other than the patron saint, San Lucas, which is celebrated on October 18.

Results Referendum Election Patroness of Villanueva del Pardillo 1995

The winner was the Virgen del Soto, who obtained 98 of the 166 votes cast. The Virgen del Valle obtained 45 votes, Our Lady of Fatima obtained 11 votes, the Virgen del Rocío was satisfied with six ballots, Our Lady of Victory was voted by four people, and Santa Claudia only obtained the only vote of a neighbor. Santa Joaquina's candidacy did not convince anyone.

=== Other celebrations ===
- San Antón (17 January): A celebration in which animals are the protagonists. The blessing of pets takes place in the church of San Lucas Evangelista, where the parish priest José Manuel Rodríguez blesses the animals that come with their owners.
- Ruta del Garbanzo Madrileño (January): Villanueva del Pardillo joins the Ruta del Garbanzo Madrileño, in which local restaurants participate in each edition. This event has established itself as a reference in gastronomic matters in the region.
- Carnival (February): Carnivals feature various activities, including the traditional pastime and costume contest. It is a celebration that brings together neighbors of all ages to enjoy the party and the festive atmosphere.
- FitKid Championship of Madrid (March): Villanueva del Pardillo hosts since 2021 the FitKid Championship of the Community of Madrid, with the participation of Club Flyback as local team.
- Great Cocido Pardillano (March–April): Under the motto "Our traditions are our value", more than 1,500 portions of traditional stew are distributed to taste on tables distributed around the Devastated Regions. It is a gathering that brings together families and friends to share the gastronomy and traditions of the municipality.
- School Olympics (March–April): More than 1,000 primary education students participate in an initiative that aims to promote sports and the values of Olympism, gathering in different disciplines and games at the sports venues established in the municipality. The educational centers are represented by the "Olympic arches pardillanos", with colors assigned to each school.
- The Pardi League (April): football tournament 11 that faces each year the last promotion of students from IES Sapere Aude, Colegio Vallmont and Antavilla, together with a guest school from another municipality. The initiative was promoted by Jaime Sanchís with the collaboration of the Department of Sports and Youth and CF Union Vva. del Pardillo.
- Holy Week (March–April): Holy Week begins with Palm Sunday and the procession of La Borriquita through the streets of the municipality. Good Friday continues with the Via Crucis from the parish to the old church, accompanied by different religious acts during the holiday.
- Maestro Miguel Literary Contest (April): This literary contest pays tribute to D. Miguel Pérez Pastor, a teacher who during the 80s worked in the municipality and promoted quality and equal education in a rural environment. Lover of literature and reading, he encouraged this passion among his students.
- Book fair "Encounter with the Words" (May): Villanueva del Pardillo celebrates its book fair in the Rosalía de Castro Park. During a weekend there are activities with the presence of authors, editorial stands, workshops, live music and shows, around the promotion of reading and culture.
- Poetry Week (May): The Poetry Week, organized together with the Memorare Association, offers a program of activities, events and workshops around poetic creation. It highlights the Night of Poetry by candlelight, a special encounter that makes the word the protagonist in an intimate atmosphere.
- Memorial Elías Velarde (June): Villanueva del Pardillo celebrated in 2025 the first edition of the Memorial Elías Velarde, in honor of who was a reference for the local sport and formator of generations of footballers. The day includes a children’s 7 football triangular and a match between former players trained by him. It was born as an annual appointment in June.
- Espiga Awards (June): Since 2025, Villanueva del Pardillo annually recognizes with the Espiga Awards athletes, clubs and people related to the sport that stand out nationally and internationally.
- Summer nights (June and July): From the end of June to mid-July, the Plaza Mayor hosts a cycle of outdoor performances with dance, flamenco, theatre and concerts.
- Summer cinema (August): Since 2019, the summer cinema cycle has been held with film screenings during Wednesdays in August.
- Pardinature (September): Days dedicated to nature to learn about the environment of the Regional Park of the Middle Course of the Guadarrama River. Include guided tours, workshops, children’s activities and astronomical observation.
- Popular Race (October): Since 1992, the Popular Race is organized, which increases its participation every year, bringing together adults, young people and children. In the 2024 edition more than 1,600 people participated.
- Little bull release (October): Villanueva del Pardillo recovered little bull release in 2024 as a pistol prior to the patron saint festivals, after approximately 30 years without being held.
- Grand Prix Pardillano (October): competition held in the bullring between local teams participating in various games of a playful nature, whose first edition was held in 2024.
- Traditional caldereta (October): Villanueva del Pardillo maintains the tradition started by Antonio Mendiguchía with the caldereta, a meat stew that is distributed after the celebration of the patron saint’s holidays. It is prepared by collaborating neighbors and with the participation of the town council, constituting an act that marks the beginning of the celebrations.
- Traditional day and night running of the bulls (October): During the patron saint’s festival of San Lucas, Villanueva del Pardillo celebrates day and night running of the bulls through the streets of the municipality to the bullring. This tradition, revived in 2019, brings together participants and spectators around the local taurine tradition.
- Concerts at patron saint festivals (October): Live music is part of the patron saint festival of Villanueva del Pardillo, with concerts and DJ sessions in spaces such as the Plaza Mayor and the roof of the San Lucas school.
- Halloween (31 October): In collaboration with BBK, the "Passage of the Terror of Villanueva del Pardillo" is organized as a Halloween celebration activity.
- Christmas (December–January): Villanueva del Pardillo develops a Christmas program that includes lighting and the opening of the municipal Crib, as well as cultural activities, youth, family and for seniors, in addition to musical events at the Municipal Auditorium and the Municipal Tent.
- Visit of Santa Claus and his reindeer (24 December): Santa Claus roams the streets of Villanueva del Pardillo on Christmas Eve at noon in his toboggan pulled by reindeer, accompanied by his elves.
- Pre-grapes pardillanas for kids (31 December): Since 2022, in collaboration with the peña Ley Seka, the Preuvas Pardillanas Infantiles are celebrated in the Plaza Mayor, with grape distribution, music and countdown bells at noon to bid farewell to the year.
- Christmas Eve, New Year’s Eve and Kings (December and January): Celebrations are held on Christmas Eve, New Year’s Eve and Kings' Night in the municipal tent. These activities have free entry, limited capacity and priority for people registered in the municipality.
- Cabalgata de SS.MM. los Reyes Magos (5 January): Arrival of the Magi de Oriente with a cavalcade formed by chariots of clubs, entities and peñas of the municipality, accompanied by dromedaries. After the tour, a chocolate party is organized in the Municipal Tent.

=== Gastronomy ===
In Villanueva del Pardillo, like the neighboring municipalities, they offer a typical and varied cuisine, the influence of the Sierra de Guadarrama, is based on all kinds of typical meats and desserts.

The municipality hosts every year the Ruta del Tapeo organized by the City Council to promote hospitality establishments and their creations. In addition, the Gastronomic Days have been organized on five occasions, where typical dishes of the area are promoted and promoted.

=== Traditions ===
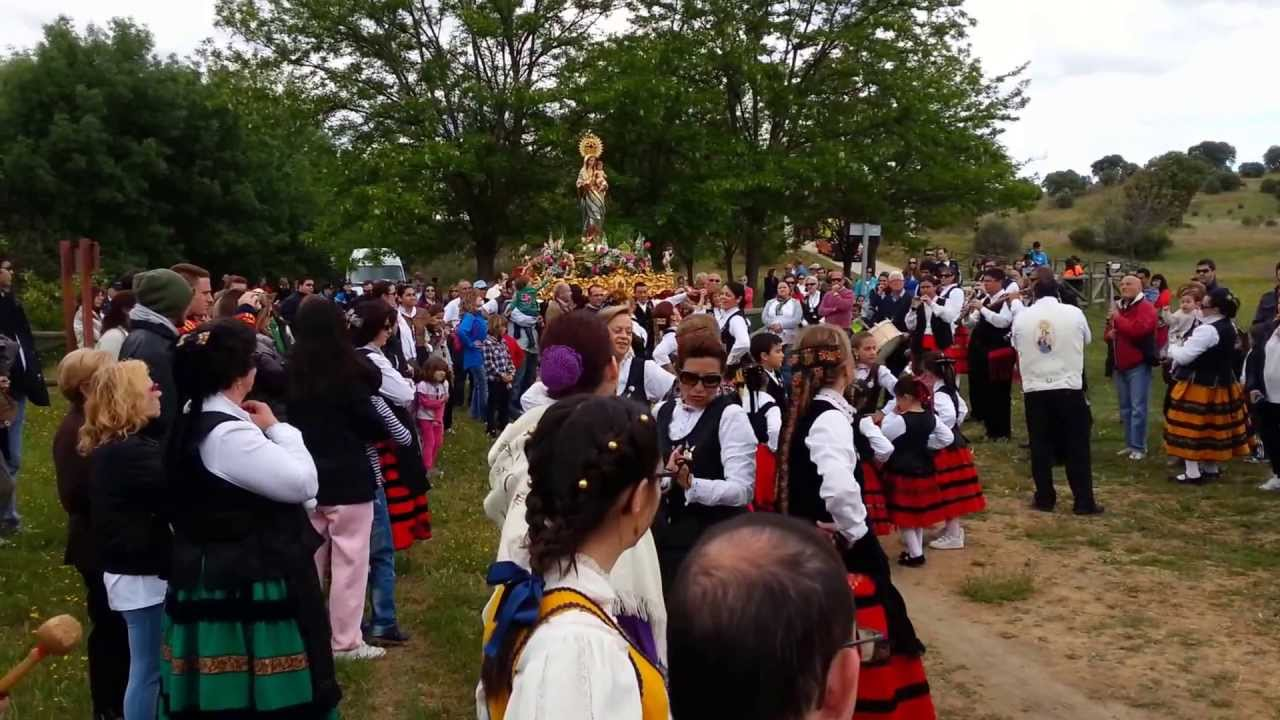
Virgen del Soto Pilgrimage

Villanueva del Pardillo is also known for the Castilian dances inherited from the Segovian dances, mainly "jotas" and "rondones", which over time have been receiving other influences, also incorporating the "seguidillas". The third Sunday of May is celebrated the Traditional pilgrimage of the "Virgen del Soto", in which tours are made through the streets, with dances of drums and dulzainas.

== Transport and Communications ==
=== Roads ===
The municipality of Villanueva del Pardillo is crossed by the following roads:

- The regional road M-509 runs through the municipality crossing the center of the town. In the east direction connects with the Bypass road M-50 and municipalities of Majadahonda and Las Rozas de Madrid, also facilitates access to urbanizations away from the urban area. In the west direction connects with the road M-503 and gives access to Los Pinos and Aulencia's Business Park.
- The regional road M-503 runs for 3 kilometers within the municipality of the town. In the west direction connects with the road M-600 and municipalities of Villanueva de la Cañada and Valdemorillo. In southeast direction it connects with the southern area of Majadahonda.
- M-851 : The regional road M-851 runs through the municipality of Majadahonda, connects Las Rozas with Villanueva del Pardillo. Starts in the kilometer 3 of the road M-505 and ends in the road M-509.

=== Interurban buses ===
Villanueva del Pardillo has a bus service with eight intercity lines, connecting with Majadahonda, Las Rozas de Madrid, Villanueva de la Cañada, Valdemorillo, Brunete and Colmenar del Arroyo. Of the intercity lines, five connect with Madrid, establishing its head in the Moncloa Interchange.

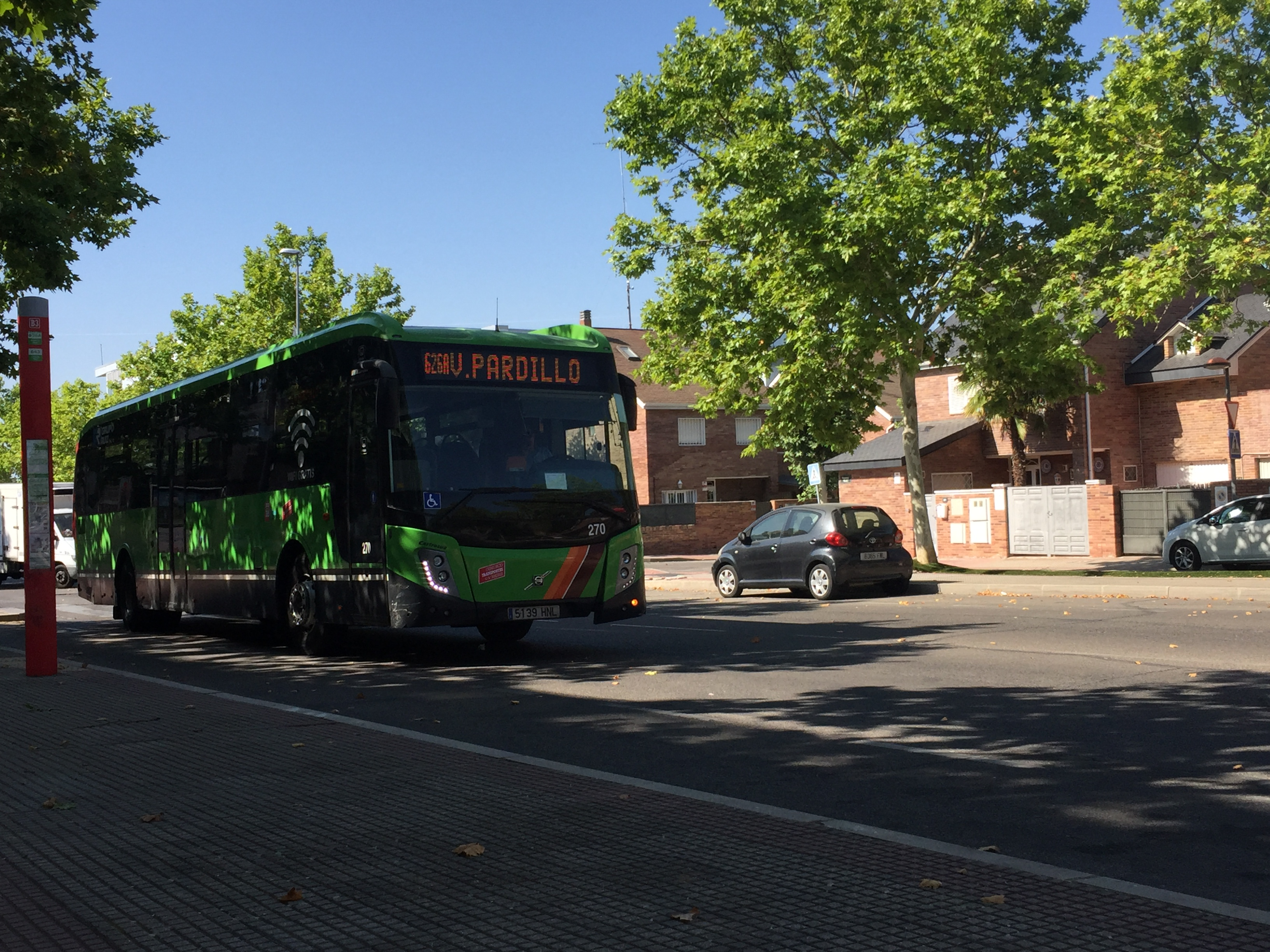
Line 626A going through Camino Real

| Transport mode | Line | Route | Operator |
|---|---|---|---|
Interurban buses
| Interurban buses | 626 | Las Rozas - Majadahonda - Villanueva de la Cañada | Auto Periferia S.A. |
| Interurban buses | 626A | Majadahonda (Railway Station) - Villanueva del Pardillo | Auto Periferia S.A. |
| Interurban buses | 627 | Madrid (Moncloa) - Villanueva de la Cañada - Brunete | Auto Periferia S.A. |
| Interurban buses | 641 | Madrid (Moncloa) - Valdemorillo | Julián de Castro, S.A. |
| Interurban buses | 642 | Madrid (Moncloa) - Colmenar del Arroyo | Julián de Castro, S.A. |
| Interurban buses | 643 | Madrid (Moncloa) - Villanueva del Pardillo | Julián de Castro, S.A. |
| Interurban buses | FS1 | Las Rozas (CC Herón City/Las Rozas Village) - Valdemorillo | Julián de Castro, S.A. |
| Interurban buses | N908 | Madrid (Moncloa) - Villanueva del Pardillo - Valdemorillo | Julián de Castro, S.A. |

On line 627 you can not do the route Madrid-Villanueva del Pardillo and vice versa.

=== Aerodrome ===
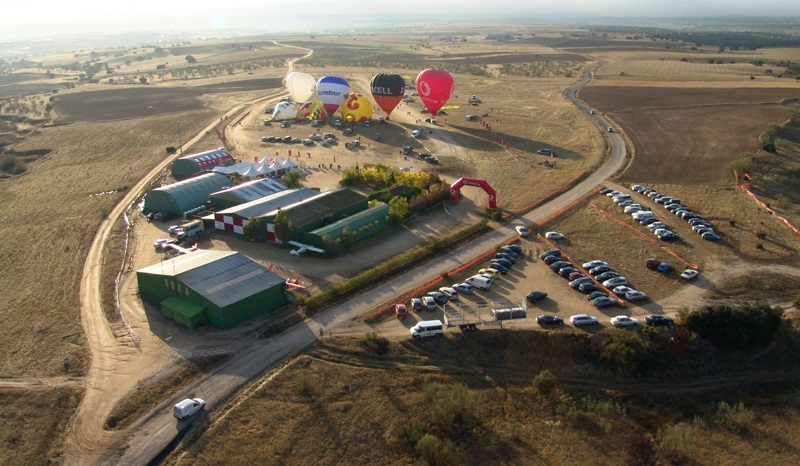
Aerodrome of Villanueva del Pardillo

Two brothers founded the first aeroclub in Spain, in 1978, at the aerodrome of Villanueva del Pardillo. Today it is a pilot school that offers courses and balloon flights, ultralight, aircraft sales and also serves as a maintenance and repair workshop.

Villanueva del Pardillo airfield, with a runway: RWY: 14 / 32 gravel compacted. 400 25m

U.L.M. Villanueva del Pardillo School

Coordinates: 40°30 10 N 3°59 58 O

Elevation: 678 m / 2237 ft

Frequency: 130.125hz

== Services to citizens ==
=== Court management ===
Villanueva del Pardillo belongs to the judicial district number 7 of Madrid, based in San Lorenzo de El Escorial, where there are several courts of first instance and investigation. In the town there is a magistrate's court located in Rio Manzanares Street, 2, where a magistrate develops the competencies of this legal entity.

=== Security ===
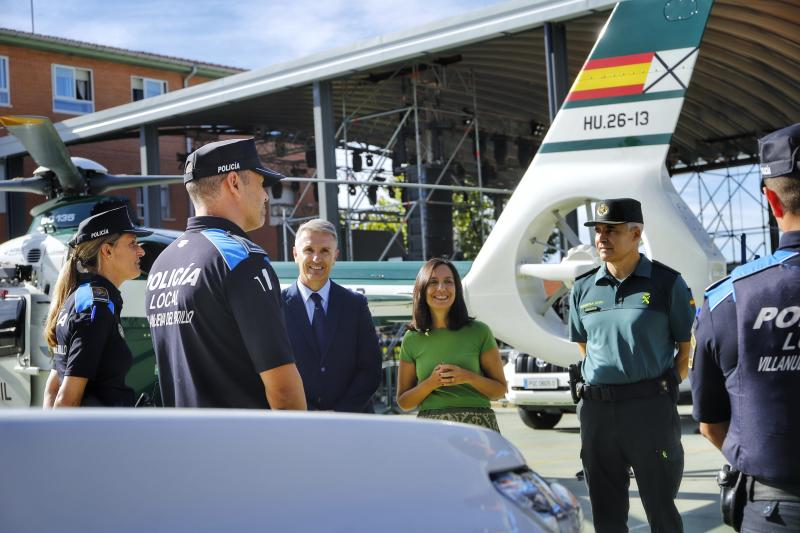
The delegate of the government of Madrid together with the mayor of Villanueva del Pardillo

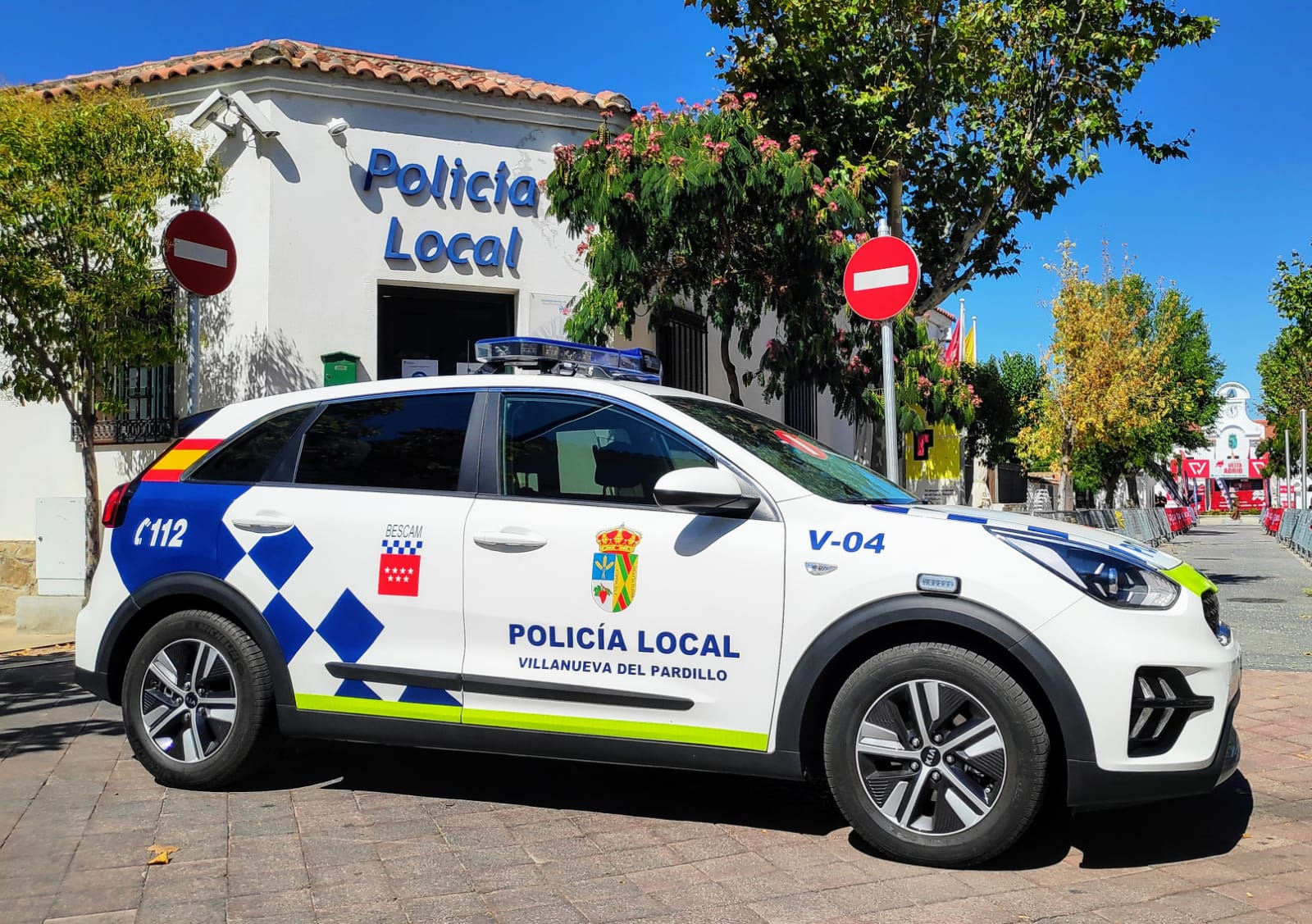
Villanueva del Pardillo's Local Police

The Department of Citizen Security is an area close to the citizen, assistance, preventive and reactive, responsible for safety, surveillance, traffic, accident assistance and conflict mediation, among other tasks.

This Department is composed of Local Police and Civil Protection, within which are units such as Gender Violence, Tutors, Administrative Police, Traffic and Road Education, Environment, Dog Guides and Communication.

Since April 2022, the Guardia Civil post has been operational in local police units for complaints or other procedures. From 8:00 to 14:00 Monday to Friday, both included.

=== Health ===
Villanueva del Pardillo has a public assistance network that manages the Comunidad de Madrid, realized in a Local Medical Office that remains open from 8 to 21 hours, located in Rio Tajuña Street. Being leading centre of Villanueva de la Cañada Health Center (Eras de Móstoles Street).

As a reference hospital, the University Hospital Puerta de Hierro Majadahonda is used, integrated into the Madrid Health Service, being the referents of Specialized Care of Area 6 of Health of the Community of Madrid. It is approximately 12 km from the town.

Cardioprotected municipality

Since 2021, Villanueva del Pardillo has been certified as a Cardioprotected Municipality, after the installation of 21 defibrillators in different strategic points, with a total of 33 operational units. They are located at different points on public roads, as well as facilities, municipal buildings, educational centers, as well as in Local Police and Civil Protection vehicles.

=== Social Services ===
The provision of social services in Villanueva del Pardillo has been carried out since 1991 by the Commonwealth of Social Services La Encina, which provides joint services to Villanueva de la Cañada, Villanueva del Pardillo, Brunete and Quijorna. To this end, the Commonwealth provides a public service to care for citizens through a team of professionals, experts in social intervention, aimed at contributing to social welfare through prevention, elimination or treatment of causes that prevent or hinder the full development of individuals or groups in which they are integrated.

The headquarters is located in Villanueva de la Cañada, in the Civic Center El Molino, providing social care in this headquarters for those registered in Villanueva de la Cañada, and in the different units enabled for this purpose in the rest of municipalities. In Villanueva del Pardillo the headquarters is located in the Senior Center of the municipality. Since 2019, the Councillor Delegate of Social Services of Villanueva del Pardillo holds the vice-presidency of the Commonwealth and Villanueva de la Cañada holds the presidency of the Commonwealth.

=== Education ===
In Villanueva del Pardillo there are 1 Public Nursery School (E.I. Virgen del Soto) and a total of 7 private Nursery Schools; 3 Public Nursery and Primary Schools (San Lucas, Rayuela and Carpe Diem) and two private schools (Vallmont College and Antavilla School); there is also a public bilingual High School (Sapere Aude).

There is an association, the Pardillo Verde, whose main objective is environmental education, its resources can be used by all the centers of Villanueva del Pardillo and its environment.

=== Culture ===
Villanueva del Pardillo offers a wide range of activities through the Municipal Schools of Music, Dance, Crafts and Theatre, as well as workshops, conferences, exhibitions, concerts and shows for all ages, held throughout the year.

=== Sports ===
Sports facilities

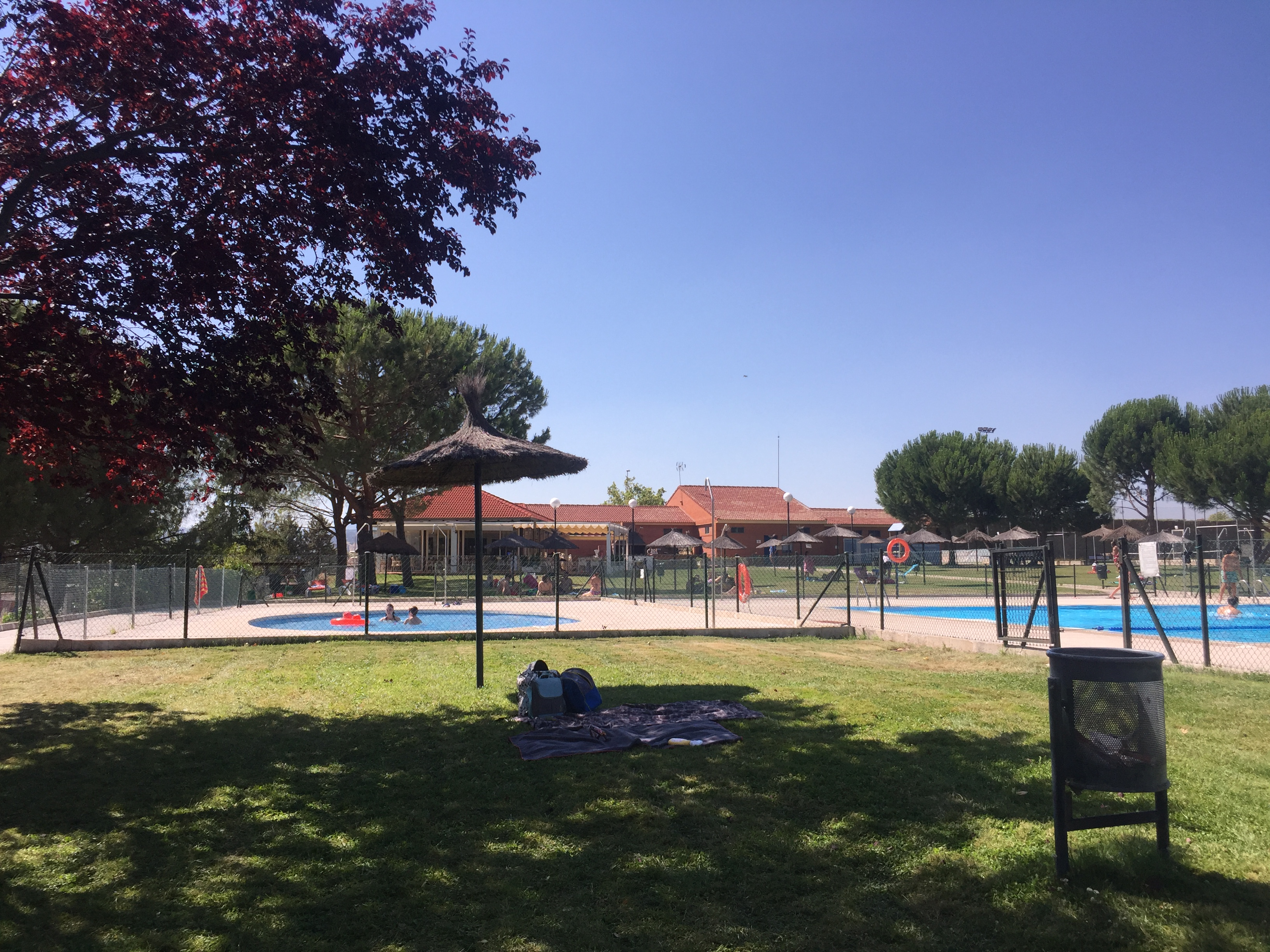
Municipal Swimming Pool Mayor Carlos Hipólito (Los Pinos)

- Sports Center Mayor Carlos Hipólito (Los Pinos).
- Infanta Cristina Sports Center.
- Soccer Field Juan Manuel Angelina.
- Indoor pool Jesús Rollán.
- Track and field.
- Outdoor pools (3 glasses)
- 5 tennis courts
- 4 paddle tennis courts
- 2 fields of beach volleyball
- 5 sports courts (multi-purpose)
- BMX track.
