= Carlos Rivera (politician) =

Spanish politician

Carlos Rivera Rivera (born 1955 or 1956) is a Spanish independent politician who has been mayor of Torremocha de Jarama in the Community of Madrid since the first democratic elections in 1979.

== Biography ==
Rivera studied for seven years in a seminary and said in 2021 that he would consider priesthood when he leaves politics. He was 23 when he was first elected mayor, having been prompted to run by negative local events such as the closing of his town's only school in 1974.

During Rivera's mandate, his town grew from 140 inhabitants to over 1,000. He set up a public-run retirement home and a co-operative for the elderly. The town also accommodated a children's home that had been rejected by other municipalities, as well as public housing to prevent the outward migration of young people.

Rivera is not paid for his role as mayor, instead working as a civil servant and as a secretary in four nearby town councils. While the law calls for council sessions to be held at least every three months, he holds them monthly, so that any councillor unable to attend once does not have to wait half a year. Rivera has faced some local criticism for his long administration, being called a cacique, a Spanish term for a political boss; he responded by saying "every four years the cacique goes to the polls. And the residents, who are very smart, keep voting for the same cacique".

In 2013, Rivera was acquitted in a legal battle of over a decade, centring around the paving of livestock roads. Prosecutors had demanded a four-year prison sentence, disqualification from public office and €100,000 compensation. The court found that Rivera allowed the works as they had been approved by the Community of Madrid.

Rivera was one of 31 mayors to retain their post for the first 40 years of democracy in local elections in Spain. He and another mayor in the Community of Madrid, Luis Partida of Villanueva de la Cañada, retained an absolute majority in that time.
