= Molière (disambiguation) =

Molière (1622–1673) was a French playwright.

Molière may also refer to:

== Arts and entertainment ==
- Molière (1909 film), a short film directed by Léonce Perret
- Molière (1956 film), directed by Norbert Tildian, starring Jean-Paul Belmondo
- Molière (1978 film), directed by Ariane Mnouchkine
- Molière (2007 film), directed by Laurent Tirard
- Molière (play), a 1919 play by Philip Moeller
- The Cabal of Hypocrites, also known as Molière, a 1929 play by Mikhail Bulgakov
- Molière Award, the national theatre award of France

== People ==
- Gert Molière (1909–1964), German theoretical physicist
- Marinus Jan Granpré Molière (1883–1972), Dutch architect
- Moliere Dimanche (born 1987), Haitian-American artist, author, and prison reform activist
- Mademoiselle Molière, stage name of French stage actress Armande Béjart (1645–1700)

== Other uses ==
- Molière (crater), on the planet Mercury
- Molière, an old name for the Algerian city of Bordj Bounaama during the French occupation
- Molière (train), a former train service between France and Germany
- Rue Molière, a short street in central Paris
- Lycée Molière (disambiguation), various schools

== See also ==
- Molières (disambiguation)
