= Luis Partida =

Spanish politician (born 1946)

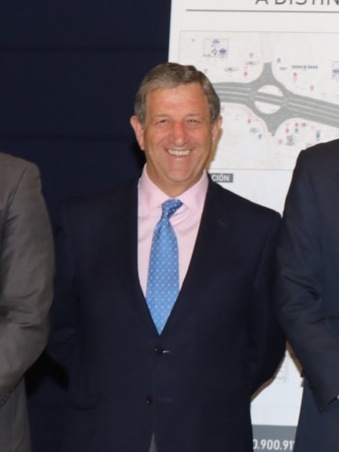

Luis Manuel Partida Brunete (born 6 September 1946) is a Spanish People's Party (PP) politician. He has been the mayor of Villanueva de la Cañada in the Community of Madrid since the first democratic elections in 1979. He was also a member of the Assembly of Madrid from 1987 to 2004.

== Biography ==
Partida was working in a bank when at the age of 32, he was elected as mayor of Villanueva de la Cañada representing the Union of the Democratic Centre (UCD) in the 1979 local elections, the first since the Spanish transition to democracy. He continued with his profession until being elected to the Assembly of Madrid in 1987. His town lacked a primary school when he was elected, and his first act was to create one; by 2019 there were eight. Over the course of his years, two universities (Alfonso X El Sabio University and Universidad Camilo José Cela) were founded, as well as an Aquópolis water park (1987) and the European Space Astronomy Centre. He also oversaw the first golf course since the transition.

In 2007, Partida appeared voluntarily before a court that was investigating him for an alleged role in the Caso Porto. It was alleged that he used access to the regional minister for city planning, Enrique Porto, in order to process planning in Villanueva from which his wife profited. By 2011, the investigation into abuse of power had been dropped.

Partida's party received 70% of the vote in the 2007 elections. After the 2019 elections, he was one of only 31 mayors to have been elected all 11 times since 1979; his town of 23,000 was by far the largest of those. In 2023, his party went from 13 seats to 16; he became one of only two mayors in the Community of Madrid to have been in office since 1979, the other being independent Carlos Rivera of Torremocha de Jarama (population 1,300).

As of 2019, he had five children and four grandchildren.
