= Lycée Molière =

Lycée Molière may refer to:

In France:

- Lycée Molière (Paris) in Paris

Outside France (includes two schools in Spain also known as Liceo Molière or Liceo Francés Molière):

- Lycée Molière de Rio de Janeiro in Rio de Janeiro, Brazil
- Lycée Français Molière de Villanueva de la Cañada in Villanueva de la Cañada, Spain
- Lycée Français Molière de Saragosse in Zaragoza, Spain
