= Villanueva de la Cañada =

- Municipality
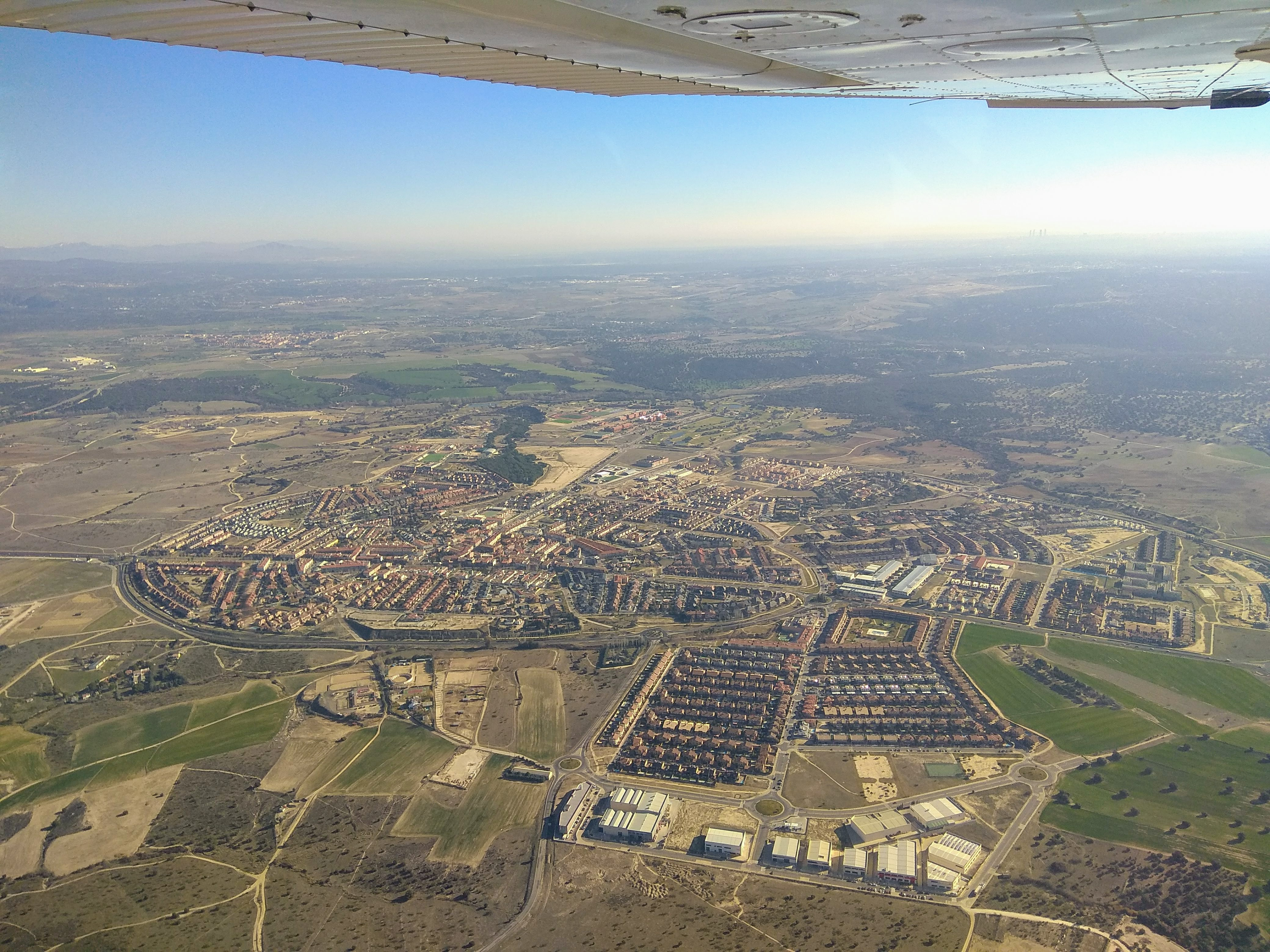

- Flag Coat of arms

- Location within Spain Location within Community of Madrid
- Coordinates: 40°27′N 3°59′W
- Country: Spain
- Region: Community of Madrid

Government
  - Mayor: Luis Partida (PP)

Area
  - Total: 34.92 km^{2} (13.48 sq mi)
- Elevation: 652 m (2,139 ft)

Population (2025-01-01)
  - Total: 24,028
  - Density: 688.1/km^{2} (1,782/sq mi)
- Time zone: UTC+1 (CET)
  - Summer (DST): UTC+2 (CEST)

Villanueva de la Cañada is a municipality in the Community of Madrid, Spain. Located 30 km north-west from Madrid, the municipality covers an area of 34.92 km^{2}. Geographically, it sits on a large plain, in which there are several promontories, on one of which is found the castle of Aulencia, its main landmark. The ESA's European Space Astronomy Centre lies close to the former, on the Guadarrama riverfront. Villafranca del Castillo, a well-off urban area detached from the main nucleus, is located within the municipal bounds. Villanueva de la Cañada hosts the main campus of the Alfonso X El Sabio University as well as the Aquópolis waterpark.

== Geography ==
Villanueva de la Cañada is watered by the rivers Guadarrama and Aulencia, as well as various streams. The latter joins eventually the Guadarrama, which flows in turn into the Tajo.

Geologically, its limits form part of the depression of the Tajo and it is defined by the existence of many alluvial fields, with an average elevation of 652 metres.

It borders Valdemorillo and Villanueva del Pardillo to the North, Majadahonda, Boadilla del Monte and Villaviciosa de Odón to the East, Brunete to the South and borders Quijorna to the West.

== Major roads ==
The municipal limits of Villanueva de la Cañada are crossed by the following major roads:

- M-600: joining San Lorenzo de El Escorial with Navalcarnero;
- M-503: joining Villanueva de la Cañada with the M-50 and M-500 (carretera de Castilla);
- M-513: joining Brunete with the M-50, passing through Guadamonte;
- M-521: joining Villanueva de la Cañada with Quijorna.

== Public transport ==
Villanueva de la Cañada is connected by several coach lines:

- 530: Navalcarnero-Villanueva de la Cañada;
- 575: Boadilla del Monte-Brunete (via Guadamonte);
- 581: Madrid (intercambiador de Príncipe Pío)-Villaviciosa de Odón-Brunete- Villanueva de la Cañada-Quijorna;
- 623: Madrid (intercambiador de Moncloa)-Las Rozas de Madrid – Villafranca del Castillo;
- 626: Las Rozas de Madrid-Majadahonda-Villanueva de la Cañada;
- 627: Madrid (intercambiador de Moncloa)-Villanueva de la Cañada-Brunete;
- 669: San Lorenzo de El Escorial-Villanueva de la Cañada.

== Education ==
The Lycée Français International Molière, a French international school, is in the city.

== Sister cities ==
- Metepec, State of Mexico, Mexico
- La Cañada Flintridge, California, U.S.

== Notable residents ==
- Paula Echevarría, actress and model.
- David Bustamante, singer.
- Jaime Mayor Oreja, ex-minister and MEP.
- Isabel Perón, ex-President of Argentina between 1974 and 1976.

== See also ==
- European Space Astronomy Centre (ESAC)
