= Molières =

Molières may refer to:

- Molières, Dordogne
- Molières, Lot
- Molières, Tarn-et-Garonne
- Molières-Cavaillac, Gard
- Molières-Glandaz, Drôme
- Molières-sur-Cèze, Gard
- Les Molières, Essonne

== See also ==
- Molière (disambiguation)
