= Colmenar del Arroyo =

- Municipality
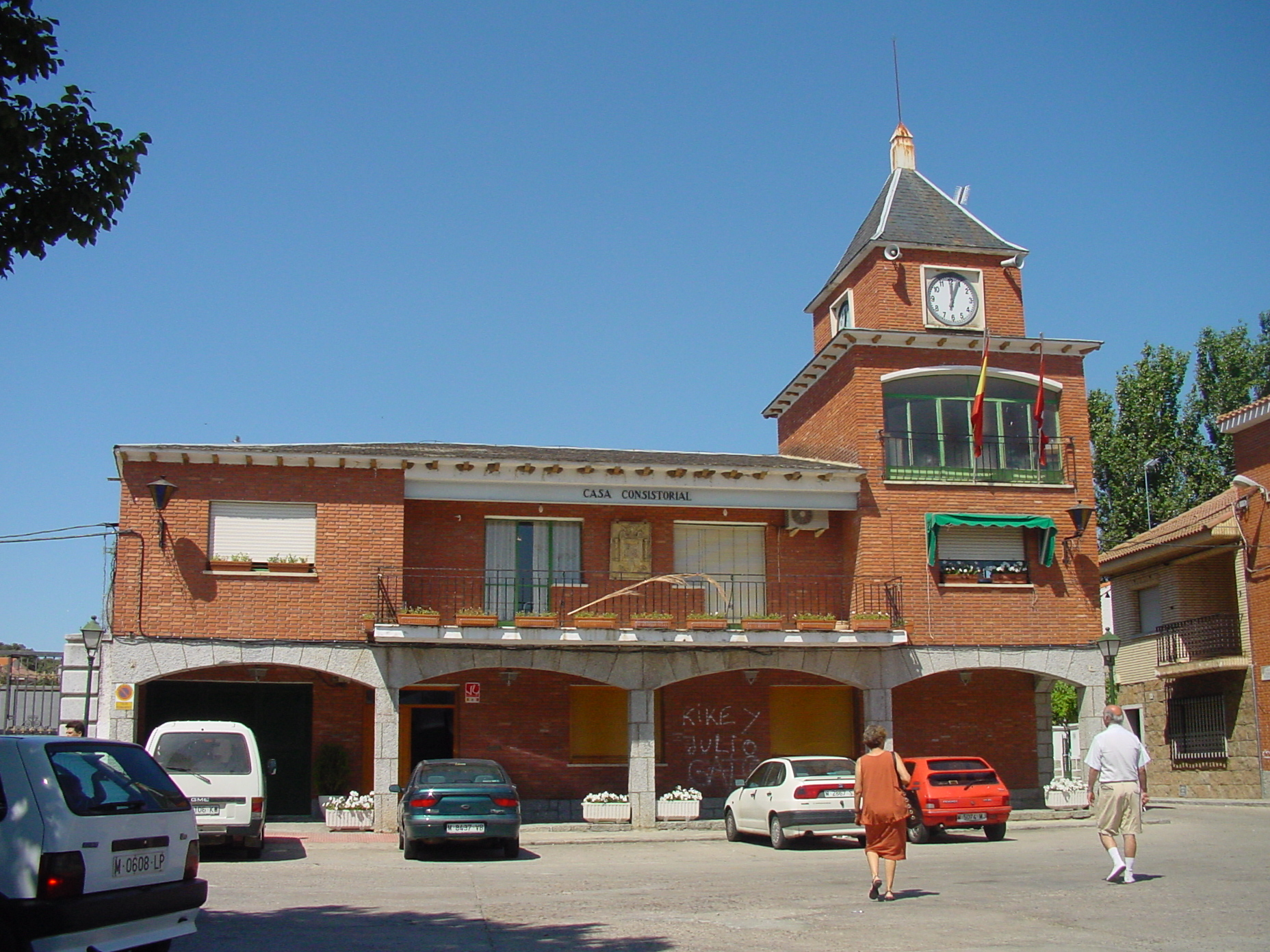
- City Hall.

- Flag Coat of arms

- Location of Colmenar del Arroyo in Madrid

- Location in Spain.
- Coordinates: 40°25′14″N 4°11′54″W
- Country: Spain
- Autonomous community: Community of Madrid
- Province: Madrid
- Comarca: Sierra Oeste de Madrid

Government
  - Mayor: Ana Belén Barbero Martín

Area
  - Total: 50.57 km^{2} (19.53 sq mi)
- Elevation: 690 m (2,260 ft)

Population (2025-01-01)
  - Total: 2,044
  - Density: 40.42/km^{2} (104.7/sq mi)
- Time zone: UTC+1 (CET)
  - Summer (DST): UTC+2 (CEST)

Colmenar del Arroyo is a municipality of the autonomous community of Madrid in central Spain. It belongs to the comarca of Las Vegas.
