= Lycée Français Molière de Saragosse =

French international school in Zaragoza, Spain

- Liceo Francés Molière Zaragoza

Location
- Calle de Manuel Marraco Ramón 8 50018 Zaragoza, España; 41.662189°N 0.8826937000000044°W

Information
- Website: lyceemolieresaragosse.fr

Lycée Français Molière de Saragosse (Spanish: Liceo Francés Molière Zaragoza) is a French international school in Zaragoza, Spain. It serves levels primaire maternelle/infantil (preschool) until lycée/bachillerato (senior high school/sixth form college).

Students begin a multilingual education programme, covering French, Castilian Spanish, and English, at age 3. In 2017 Muriel Fabre, the director of the nursery and primary school, stated that the school emphasises concepts rather than memorization and focuses on individual student ability rather than grade levels.

== See also ==
- Institut français de Saragosse
