= Lycée Français International Molière de Madrid =

Location
- Calle Cristo 27, 28691 Villanueva de la Cañada; Community of Madrid; Spain; 40.4484522°N 4.000374°W

Information
- Other name: Liceo francés internacional Molière
- Former names: Cours Molière, Lycée Molière, Lycée français Molière
- School type: centro docente extranjero (foreign system school, French, in Spain)
- Founded: 1973
- Authority: AEFE
- Grades: kindergarten, preschool, primary, middle, high school
- Age range: 0-18
- Enrollment: ~700
- Education system: French
- Language: French, Spanish, English
- Accreditation: Ministry of National Education (France), Education dept of the Community of Madrid
- Affiliations: AEFE, MLF
- Website: liceofrancesmoliere.es

The Lycée Français International Molière de Madrid (Spanish: Liceo Francés Internacional Molière de Madrid), formerly Lycée Français Molière de Villanueva de la Cañada, (Spanish: Liceo Francés Molière de Villanueva de la Cañada) is a French international school in Villanueva de la Cañada, Community of Madrid, Spain. It is governed by the rules of foreign system schools ("centros docentes extranjeros") in Spain, and French national Education.

The school belongs to the Mission laïque française (MLF) and all levels are accredited ("homologués") by the Agency for French Education Abroad (AEFE), from petite section (2-3 yo) to terminale (final year of lycée, or senior high/sixth form). Besides French, Spanish and English are taught since the earliest age, following the motto of the MLF: “two cultures, three languages”.

The school also has a kindergarten corresponding to the first cycle of Spanish preschool ("primer ciclo de educación infantil", 0–3 years).

It's one of five accredited French schools in and around Madrid, with the Lycée français de Madrid (and annex, in the north-east), Pomme d'Api (level Maternelle only, in the north-east), Saint-Louis des Français (level Primary accredited, catholic school, in the north-west), Union chrétienne de Saint-Chaumond (catholic school for girls, in the north).

Like most French establishments abroad, the school calendar follows the principles of French school rhythms (36 weeks in 5 periods) with adaptations to the local context.

== History ==
It was established in 1973 as Cours Molière in Pozuelo de Alarcón, initially as a primary school (Maternelle and Élémentaire levels).

In 1986 the management of the school was handed over to the MLF, joining its international network of schools, and opening the Collège level (first years of secondary, or middle school). The MLF subsequently became its owner.

Space constraints justified the move to Villanueva de la Cañada in 1993, on a municipally owned plot with transfer of surface rights, in new buildings allowing the opening of the Lycée level (final years of secondary, or high school). On this occasion, the name of the school was changed to Lycée Molière.

Between 2003 and 2013, science laboratories, sports facilities, and a new multi-function building (auditorium, library, etc.) were inaugurated.

The school launched its webradio in 2016, became a Baccalauréat examination center in 2018, and obtained the eco-school label in 2019, which includes educational initiatives such as vegetable gardens, a small pond, and even a henhouse.

The main access gate was redesigned and rebuilt in 2023, coinciding with the 50 years of the school.

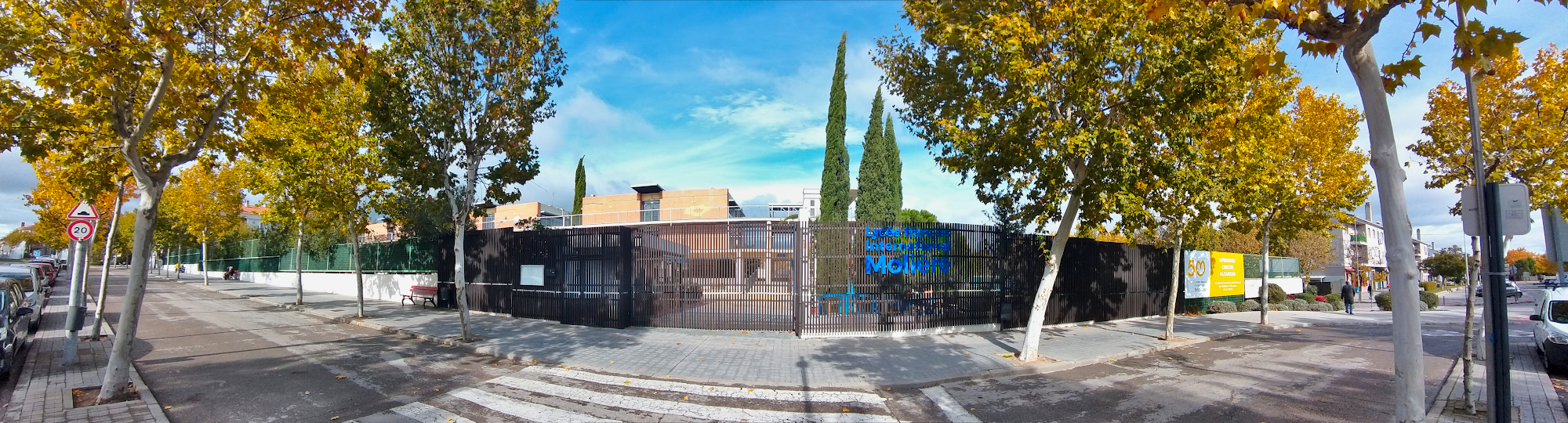
Lycée Français International Molière, Villanueva de la Cañada, Community of Madrid, Spain - main entrance, Calle Cristo - November 2023

== See also ==
- Liceo Español Luis Buñuel, a Spanish international school near Paris, France
