= Guadarrama (river) =

River in Spain

Coordinates: 39.882052°N 4.169262°W

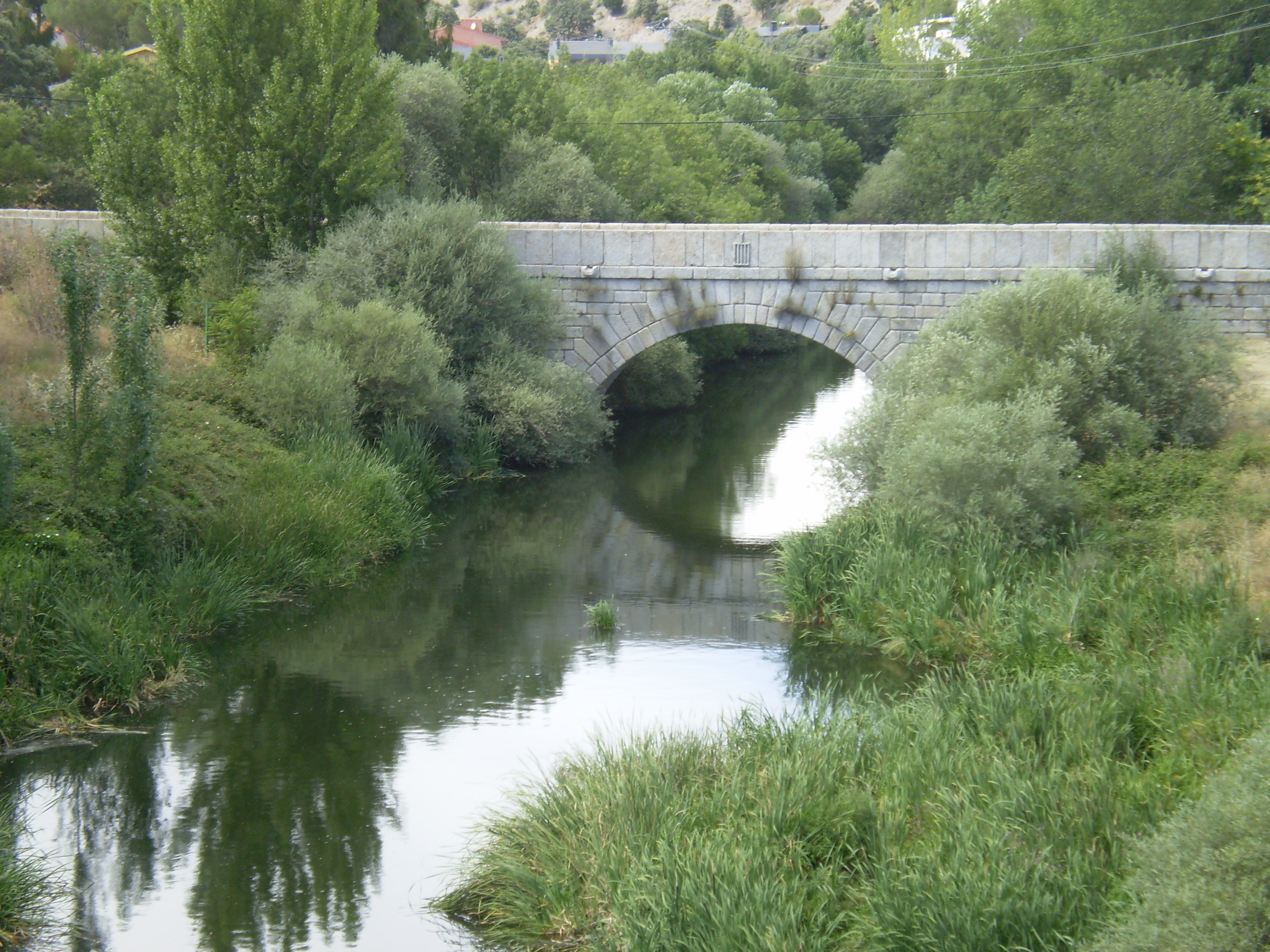
- Río Guadarrama. Community of Madrid, Spain

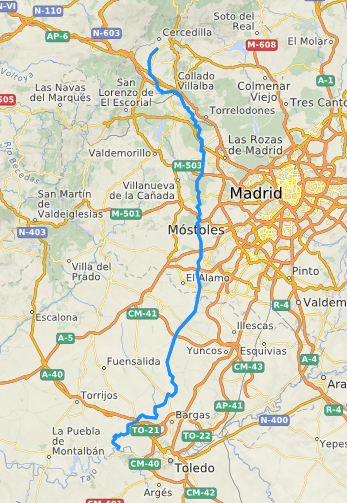
- Path of the Guadarrama

Location
- Country: Spain
- Region: Community of Madrid; Castilla-La Mancha; Province of Toledo

Physical characteristics
- Source
  - location: Siete Picos (Sierra de Guadarrama)
  - elevation: 1,900 m (6,200 ft)
- Mouth
  - location: Tagus
  - elevation: 500 m (1,600 ft)
- Length: 131.80 km (81.90 mi)
- Basin size: 1,708 km^{2} (659 sq mi)

Basin features
- Progression: Tagus→ Atlantic Ocean
- Tributaries
  - left: Aulencia

The Guadarrama (Spanish pronunciation: [gwaðaˈrama]) is a river in Spain. A tributary of the Tagus, the longest river on the Iberian Peninsula, Guadarrama has its source in the Siete Picos, part of the Sierra de Guadarrama, in the Community of Madrid, in the central part of the country, at an altitude of 1,900 metres (6,200 ft).

== Course ==
The Guadarrama flows from north to south for 131.80 kilometres (81.90 mi) through the autonomous community of Castilla-La Mancha and the Province of Toledo, where it empties into the Tagus.

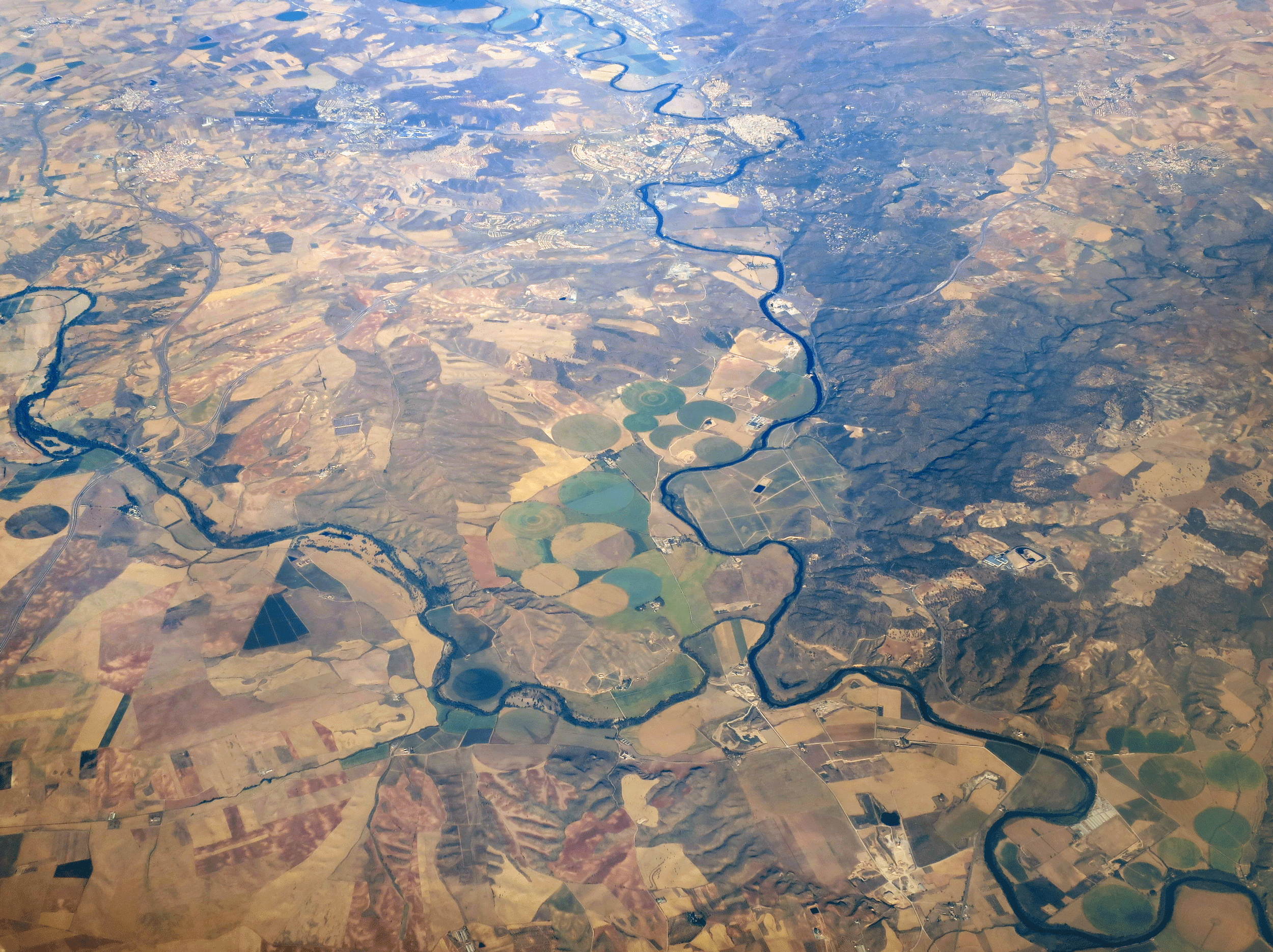
Aerial view of where the Guadarrama joins the Tagus

Its middle course is a protected area within the Regional Park of the Middle Course of the Guadarrama River and Its Surroundings (Spanish: Parque Regional del curso medio del río Guadarrama y su entorno), which is one of the three regional parks within the Community of Madrid. The basin area is about 1,708 square kilometres (659 sq mi) Its main tributary is the Aulencia River, which flows entirely within the Community of Madrid and supplies water to the reservoir of Valmayor.
