= Torremocha de Jarama =

Coordinates: 40°50′N 3°30′W

- Municipality
- Flag Coat of arms

- Municipal location within the Community of Madrid.
- Country: Spain
- Autonomous community: Community of Madrid

Area
  - Total: 7.14 sq mi (18.49 km^{2})
- Elevation: 2,320 ft (707 m)

Population (2025-01-01)
  - Total: 1,157
  - Density: 162.1/sq mi (62.57/km^{2})
- Time zone: UTC+1 (CET)
  - Summer (DST): UTC+2 (CEST)

Torremocha de Jarama is a municipality of the Community of Madrid, Spain.
