= Brunete =

Municipality in Madrid, Spain

- Municipality
- Coat of arms

- Location of Brunete in Madrid

- Location in Spain
- Coordinates: 40°24′0″N 3°59′37″W
- Country: Spain
- Autonomous community: Madrid
- Province: Madrid
- Comarca: Madrid Metropolitan Area

Government
  - Alcalde: Borja Gutiérrez Iglesias (PP)

Area
  - Total: 48.94 km^{2} (18.90 sq mi)
- Elevation: 656 m (2,152 ft)

Population (2025-01-01)
  - Total: 11,287
  - Density: 230.6/km^{2} (597.3/sq mi)
- Demonym: brunetense
- Time zone: UTC+1 (CET)
  - Summer (DST): UTC+2 (CEST)
- Postal code: 28690
- Climate: Csa
- Website: Official website

Brunete (Spanish pronunciation: [bɾuˈnete]) is a town located on the outskirts of Madrid, Spain, with a population of 10,730 people.

== History ==
Brunete during the Civil War
from	to	duration (days)	in control of
18 July 1936	1 November 1936	106	Republicans
1 November 1936	6 July 1937	247	Nationalists
6 July 1937	24 July 1937	18	Republicans
24 July 1937	1 April 1939	616	Nationalists

There was no military garrison in Brunete and there was no rebel attempt to seize the city during the coup of July 1936. Brunete remained in the deep rear of the front, in the summer established in Sierra de Guadarrama, some 20 km to the north. The Nationalist 7. Division approached the city in mid-October 1936, and on 18 October the Republican government declared Brunete within zona de guerra. There was no major fighting reported before, on 1 November 1936, the Nationalist troops seized Brunete.

In the summer of 1937 the Republican general staff prepared a diversionary offensive; it was intended to make Franco shift some of his troops from Cantabria and assist the defenders of Santander. The attack commenced in very late hours of 5 July, and on the evening of 6 July Brunete was re-taken by the Republicans; they claimed to have taken 80 prisoners. The Nationalists re-grouped and indeed moved some units from the Northern Front. Following some 2 weeks of fierce fighting, Brunete was again seized by the rebels on 24 July 1937. For the remainder of the war the city remained under the Nationalist control in the rear of the frontline, some 10 km from combat positions at the outskirts of Madrid.

In 2013 the local council launched a system to tackle a perceived dog excrement problem, which involved identifying offending dogs and posting the excrement to the homes of their owners. Initial results showed that the amount of dog faeces in the town reduced by 70 per cent.

== Geography ==
The town is located 27.35 kilometres (16.99 mi) from the centre of Madrid.

== See also ==
- Battle of Brunete
- Brunete Armoured Division
