= Saint Jude Thaddaeus (Master Theodoric) =

Painting by Master Theodoric

Coordinates: 49.9400°N 14.1897°E

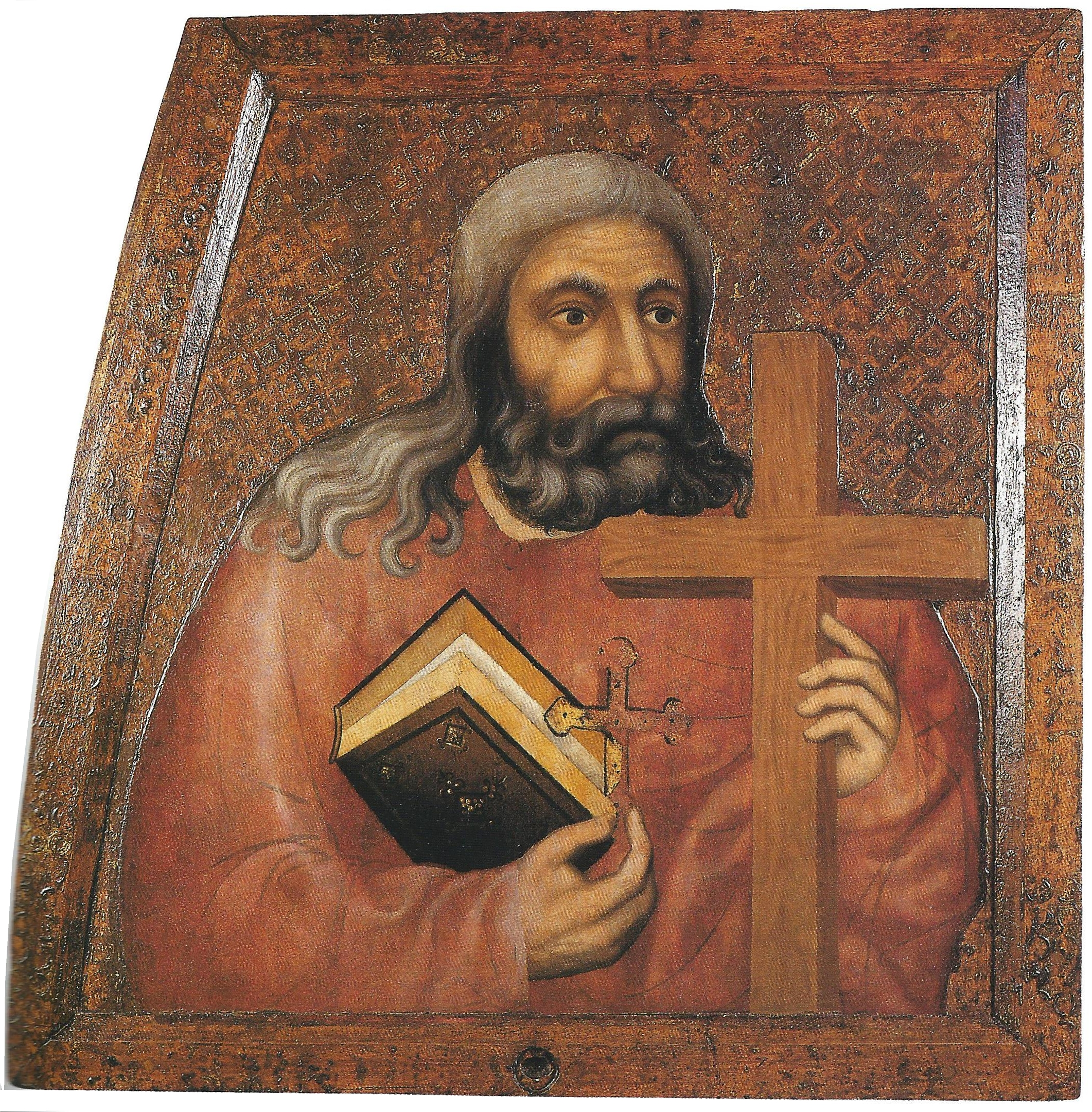
Saint Jude Thaddeus

Saint Jude Thaddaeus is an oil on tempera painting by Czech master Master Theodoric, created around 1360–1364.

The panel painting St. Jude Thaddeus is an impressive painting on a wooden panel belonging to a set of 129 paintings of the "Heavenly Army" or "Army of Christ" (originally there were 130 of them). The set covers all the walls of the chapel of the Holy Cross at Karlštejn Castle. It is the largest set of panel paintings produced in Europe in the 14th century; it came from the Prague workshop headed by Master Theodoric. The larger-than-life half- figures of saints from the workshop of Master Theodoric follow the North Italian style and the Byzantine influences that came mainly from Venice; they significantly contributed to the emergence of a new painting style called soft style, which dominated the Czech panel painting in the 1460s and 1470s and spread beyond the borders of the kingdom. The cycle of Karlštejn paintings was commissioned by Charles IV, Holy Roman Emperor with the aim of guarding the imperial crown jewels and relics of the saints, which the emperor left in the chapel of the Holy Cross.
