= Saint Simon (Master Theodoric) =

Painting by Master Theodoric

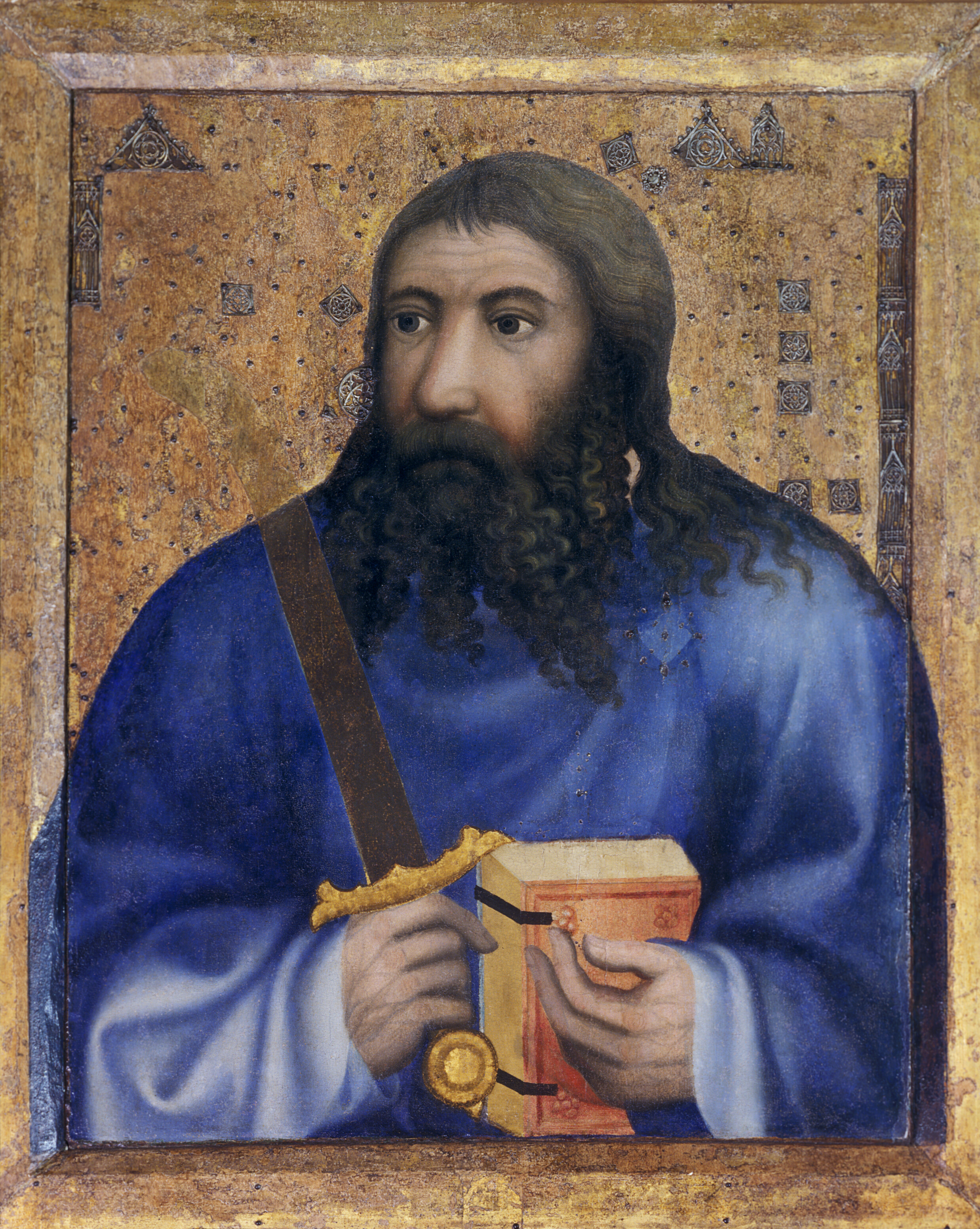
- Saint Simon (Master Theodoric)
- Artist: Master Theodoric
- Year: c. 1360 - 1365
- Medium: oil tempera on beech board
- Dimensions: 115,2 cm × 92,9 cm (454 in × 366 in)
- Location: Chapel of the Holy Cross (Karlštejn)

Saint Simon is an oil tempera on beech board painting attributed to Master Theodoric, created around 1360-1365. In the Chapel of the Holy Cross at Karlštejn, his image is placed on the eastern (epistle) wall of the presbytery behind a dividing metal grille.

== Description and classification ==
The background of the painting partially preserves metal gilding applications. The Apostle Saint Simeon of Canaan is depicted with a book and one of his attributes, a short sword.

Examination of the image using infrared reflectography revealed a fine and detailed underdrawing in the face and a sovereign drapery sketch. The painting's execution places the work among the major works of Master Theodoric. Compared to his masterpieces, the painting with St. Simon is characterized by a harder and more schematic rendering in the incarnations, a certain flattening and simplification of the face, and less plasticity in the drapery. The long hair and beard are twisted in regular meanders, similar to the paintings of St. Matthew and St. Philip. The painting is exceptional in that it partially preserves metal gilding elements. These originally decorated several paintings. Traces of their attachment are most often found in the halos.

The ornaments are cast from a mixture of lead and tin, gilded on the surface. They repeat architectural motifs that have analogous counterparts in Peter Parler´s works: triangular pennants with quadrillobes and crabs, rosettes and Gothic windows with crosses. They are analogous to the so-called pilgrim badges, which were mass-produced and sold at pilgrimage sites in Western Europe, and also during the Prague pilgrimages to the Holy Relics during the reign of Charles IV.

The cooperation of Theodoric with goldsmiths is indirectly evidenced by some written documents, e.g. a letter of King Wenceslus IV from 1381. Theodoric apparently died without heirs and his estate in Mořina was sold by two later owners, Mikuláš Mendik of Plos (Jílový), father of the goldsmith Jorg, and the Prague goldsmith Jan Waczenste (Vacenser). How they became owners of the estate cannot be ascertained from the deed.

In the Chapel of the Holy Cross, the image of St. Simon is placed next to St. Judas Thaddeus, with whom he shares the feast day of 28 October in the Western Christian Church. On this day, the relics of both apostles were transferred to St. Peter's Basilica in Rome. Simon worked with Judas Thaddaeus in Armenia and then in Persia, where he was crucified and sawed to pieces, killed or hacked to pieces. Therefore, he is more often depicted with another attribute - a saw, possibly an axe, or a cross.

=== St. Simon in the works of graphic artists and painters ===
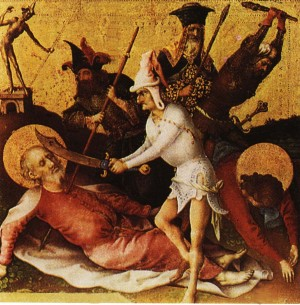
Stefan Lochner, The Martyrdom of the Apostles (1435-40)

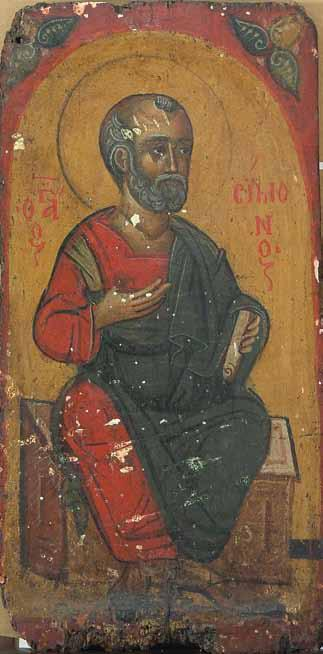
Apostol Simon-Sv.Gorgi-Struga, Macedonian icon (15th century)

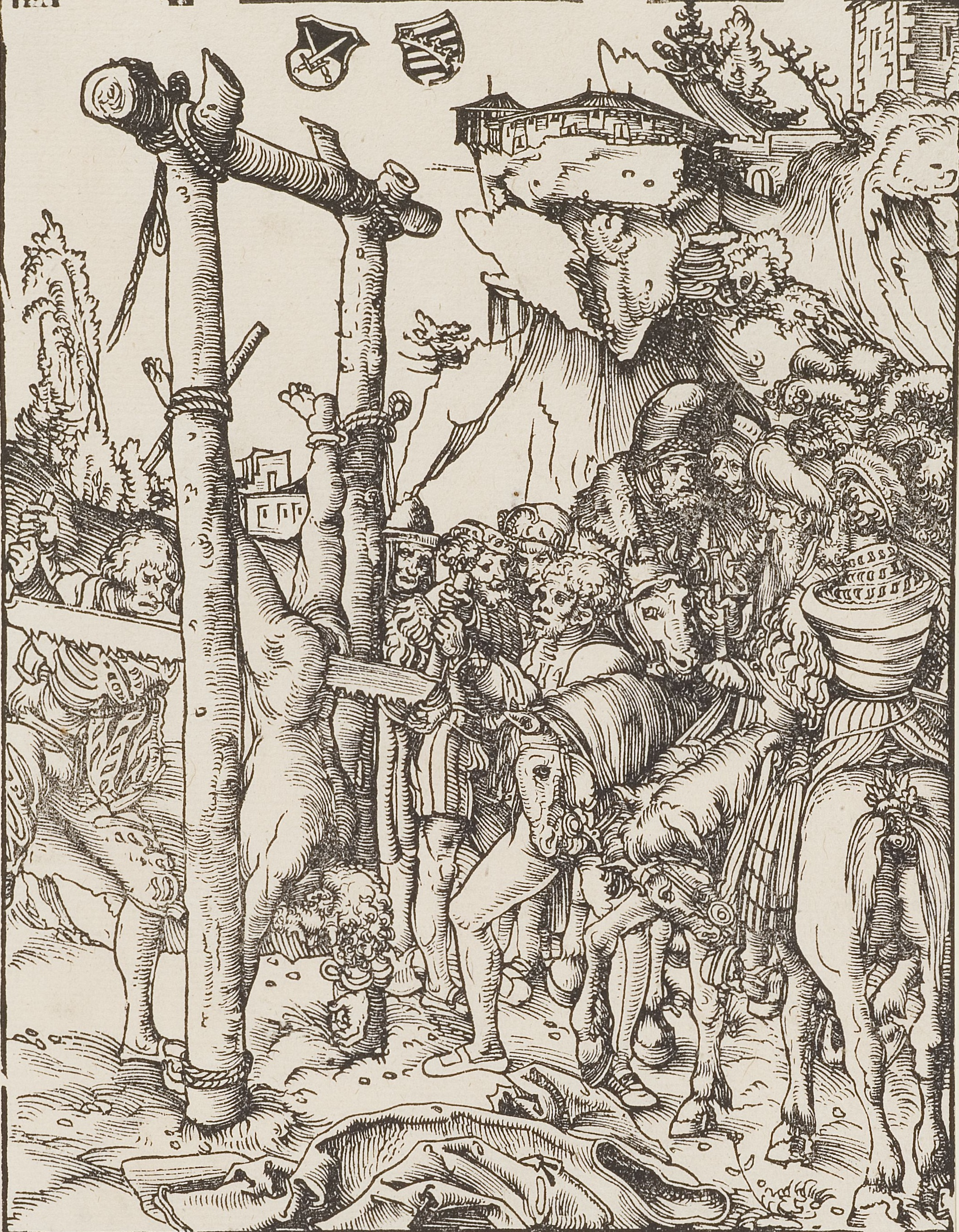
Lucas Cranach the Elder, Zersägen des hl. Simon, woodcut (1512)

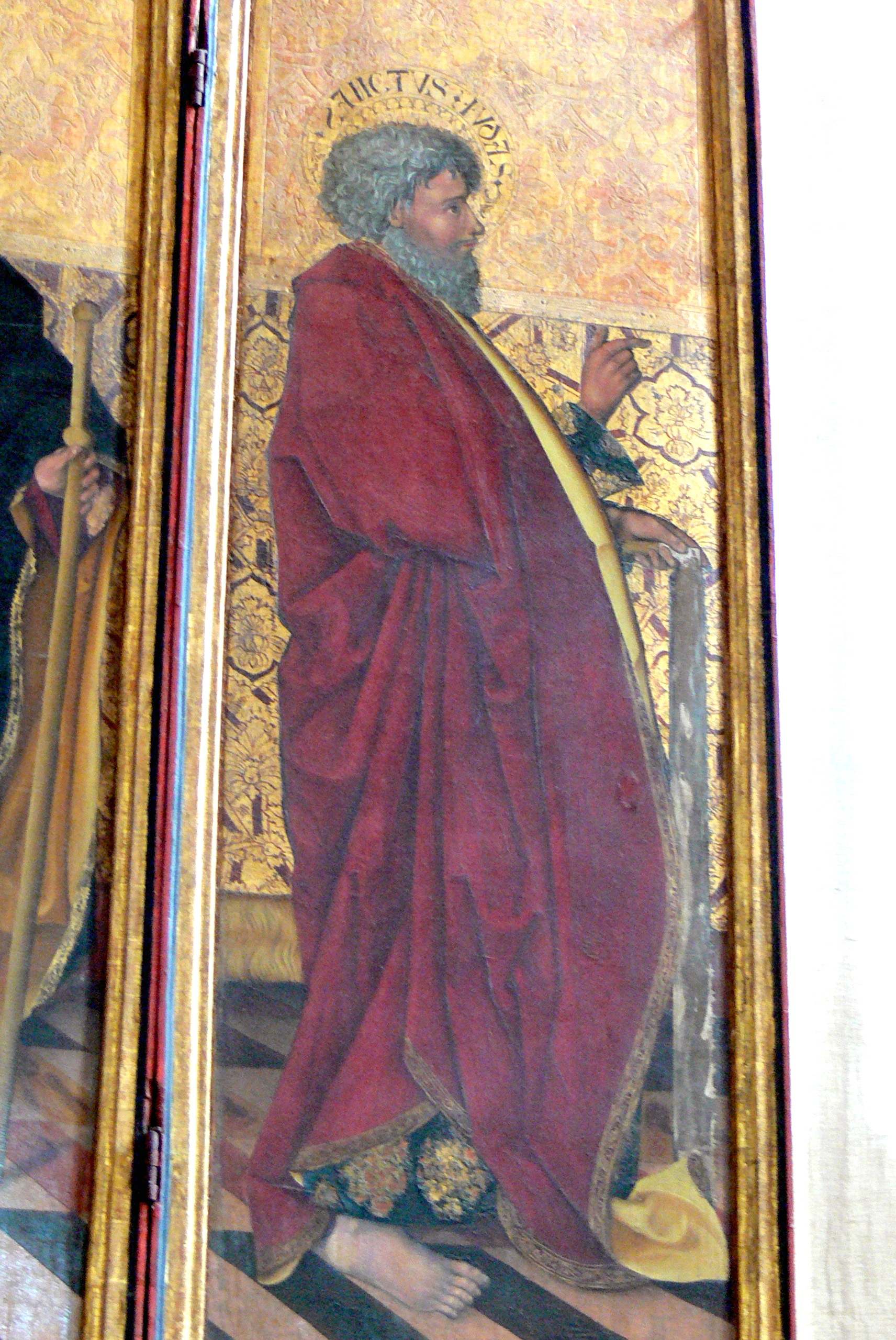
Saint Simon Zelotes, Altar of Saint Andrew, Bavaria (1500s)

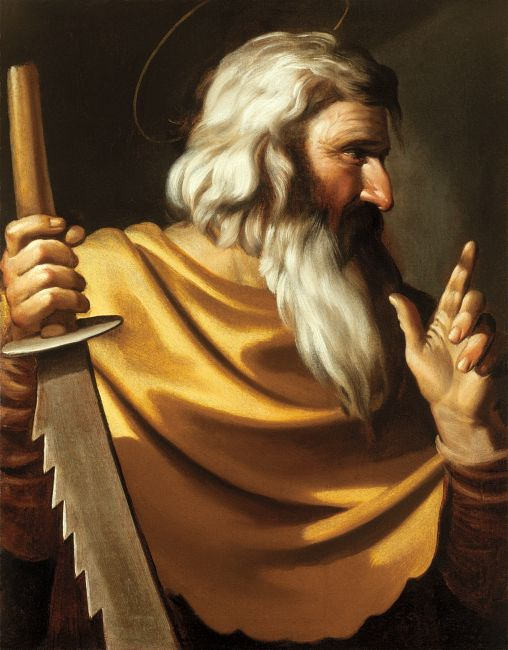
Simon, follower of Caravaggio (17th century)

== Sources ==
- Jiří Fajt (ed.), Magister Theodoricus, court painter to Emperor Charles IV, National Gallery in Prague 1997, ISBN 80-7035-142-X
- Hana Blochová, Art Technology and Decoration of the Chapel of the Holy Cross, pp. 600-610, in: Jiří Fajt (ed.), Magister Theodoricus, Court Painter to Emperor Charles IV, National Gallery in Prague 1997
- Karel Stejskal, Art at the Court of Charles IV, Artia Prague 1978
