= Master of the Luxembourg Genealogy =

Court painter of the Emperor Charles IV

Master of the Luxembourg Genealogy (or: Master of the Karlštejn Genealogy) was the court painter of the Holy Roman Emperor Charles IV. He is referred to by his most important work, the murals with figures of the monarchs in the imperial palace at Karlštejn Castle.

== Work ==
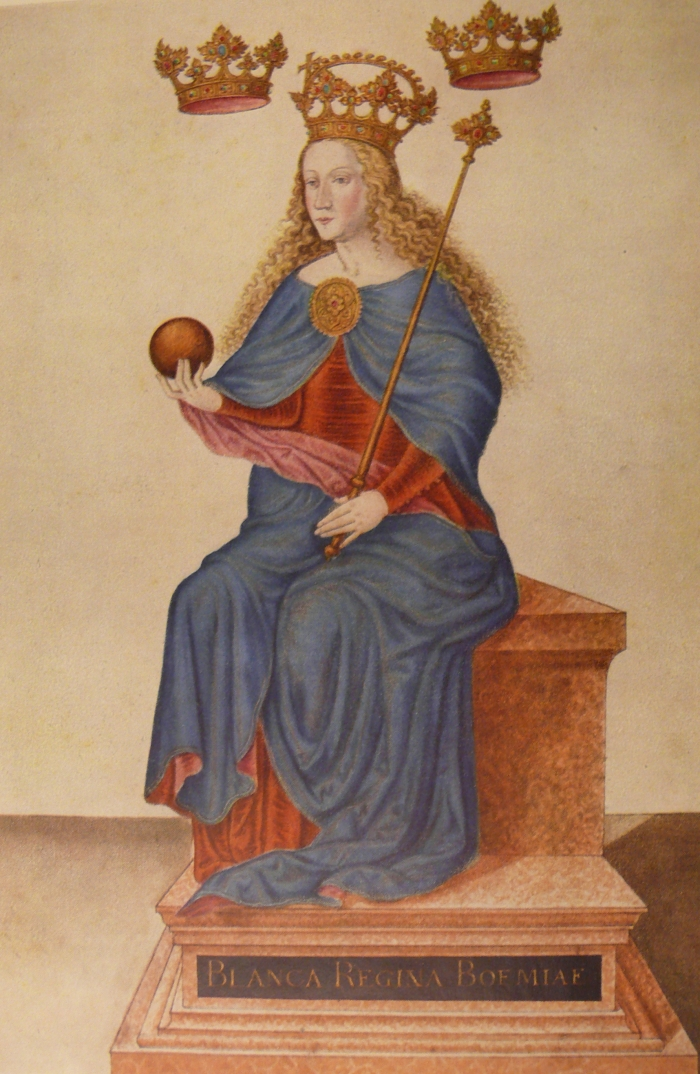
Codex Heidelbergensis: Blanche of Valois

The anonymous Master of the Luxembourg Genealogy probably came from the Flemish part of France. The Luxembourg family tree was created around 1355-1357, after return of Charles IV to Karlštejn from his Roman coronation, which took place on 5 April 1355. However, the murals were destroyed during the renovation of Karlštejn at the end of the 16th century and have survived only in copies.

The work of the Master of Luxembourg Genealogy falls into a period when the philosophical-religious perception of the world was permeated by a tendency to know the real reality perceptible to the senses, and this change is also reflected in artistic expression. The first attempts to capture a real likeness are known from French sculptural tombstones (Jean Pépin de Huy, before 1329, tombstone of Count Charles d'Évreux, 1336) and illuminations and tombstones by André Beauneveu (1365-1400). One of the earliest pictorial portraits is considered to be the work of an anonymous artist from around 1350, who captured the likeness of the French king John the Good. Although the Master of the Luxembourg Genealogy worked with a formula of basic types of figures, movement patterns, gestures and faces, his art is full of new inventions. He used visual experience to overcome the abstracting linearism of the previous period and attempted to individualize the figures. He was one of the European pioneers of the new naturalism in portrait art. His work at the Prague royal court and at Karlštejn influenced the further development of painting, which continued with a set of Master Theodoric panel paintings. or murals with busts of the patron saints and apostles of the country, the work of an unknown master in the Karlštejn chapel of St. Catherine.

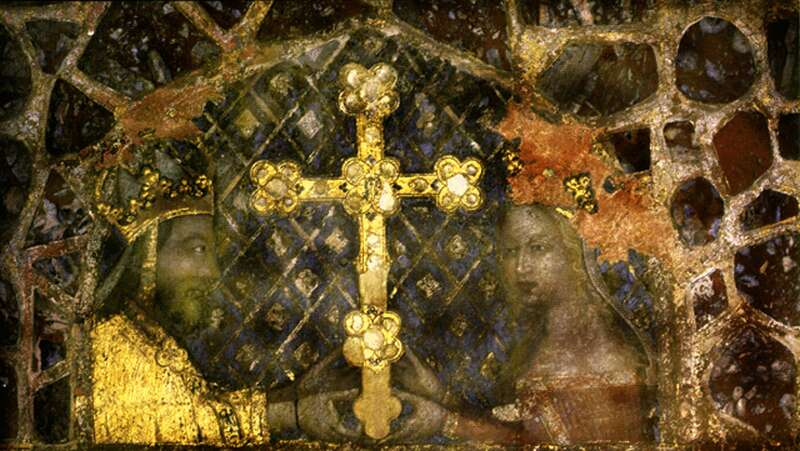
Charles IV and Anna von Schweidnitz

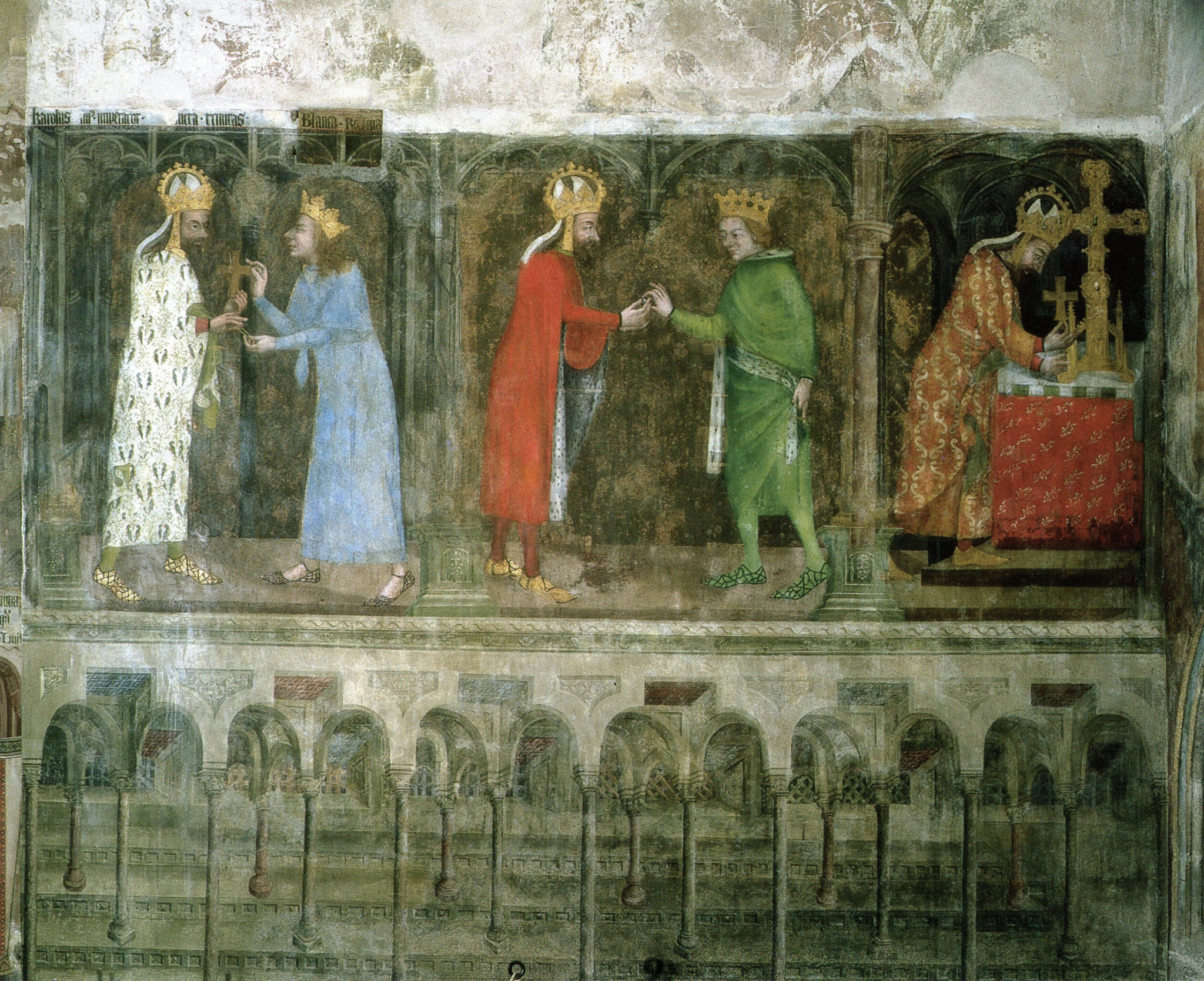
Relic Scenes, Chapel of St. Mary, Karlštejn

Art historians assume that the Master of the Luxembourg Genealogy is also the author of the so-called Relic Scenes in the Chapel of St. Mary and the double portrait of Charles IV and Anna von Schweidnitz with the relic cross (Exaltatio crucis) on the entrance wall of the Emperor's private oratory (St. Catherine's Chapel) at Karlštejn. Before 1360 he probably participated in the initial designs of the decoration of the Chapel of the Holy Cross at Karlštejn and is attributed with the drawings on the walls of the altar area and also the scene of the Adoration of the Twenty-four Elders in the western window niche. The drawings on the wall of the chapel are not just linear sketches, but the faces are modelled by accentuating the highlights with chalk and also by drawn shadows.

There is written evidence of the existence of the Luxembourg family tree by the Brabant chronicler and envoy Edmund de Dynter in 1445, who saw it during an audience with King Wenceslas IV, in the work Chronica nobilissimorum ducum Lotharingiae, Brabantiae ac regum francorum. Wenceslaus IV showed Edmund de Dynter the sua genealogia (his own family tree) that his father Charles IV had had made, showing a direct line of descent to Charlemagne and through him to the Trojans. Further evidence of the paintings can be found in the so-called Report on the Repair of Karlštejn Castle of 1597, which states that the family of Emperor Charles IV was painted in the palace (the great hall of the second floor), where the old plaster had fallen off and had to be repainted with lime and faded.

Renaissance copies of the Family Tree were made between 1569 and 1575. These survive in two book editions. The first of these, a codex of the former court library in Vienna, dedicated in 1571 to Emperor Maxmilian II, is preserved in the Österreichische Nationalbibliotek in Vienna. It was created by the Czech engineer Matouš Ptáček-Ornys of Lindperk as a basis for the restoration of the damaged paintings, and the reconstruction partly used an old workshop sketchbook from 1370-1390. The second, the so-called Heidelberg Codex ("Codex-Heidelbergensis") from 1574-1575, was purchased in 1933 for the National Gallery in Prague. The two editions are almost identical and show a total of 56 figures and also the so-called "Relics Scenes" from the Chapel of the Virgin Mary at Karlštejn, which are an important guide for art historians. The copies do not capture the usual Gothic architecture (painted arcades), which was probably part of the murals. Instead, figures of rulers stand or sit on Renaissance plinths with inscriptions. However, the artistically faithful likenesses of Charles IV and his counterparts in the relic scenes, which can be compared with the surviving murals, testify to the high degree of reliability and authenticity of the copies of the figures.

The characters of the Family Tree were apparently also the inspiration for the miniature versions of the Emmaus Latin Bible and the Bible of Scribe Nicholas. According to some of the surviving paintings of the Emmaus cycle, where face types identical to those of the figures from the Heidelberg Codex are found, it is likely that the Master of the Luxembourg Genealogy or his workshop also participated in the decoration of the cloister of the Emmaus Monastery.

The Master of the Luxembourg Genealogy was identified by A. Friedl with Nicholas Wurmser, but some more recent literature disagrees with this view and consistently uses the neutral designation Master of the Luxembourg Genealogy.

=== Figures of the Family Tree ===
The names and titles of the figures are preserved in a copy called "Linea Caroli IV." In the Heidelberg Codex, which has 56 depictions, including the so-called "Relic Scenes" from Karlštejn Chapel of St. Mary, the copyist may not have captured all the figures of the original Luxembourg family tree. The division of the Family Tree is based on Augustine's conception of four ages - biblical, ancient, Christian and post-last judgment.

In the first group of figures, the biblical patriarchs Ham, Cush and Nimrod are depicted alongside the forefather Noah (spiritually representing Christ). This was followed by the ancient heroes and gods Belus, Ninus, Saturnus, Jupiter, Dardanus, Herictonius, Ylus and Martomirus, and the Trojan king Priamus. He was followed by Pharamond, Clovis I, Merovech and Childeric I - the founders of the Frankish Merovingian dynasty, followed by the Salian dynasty: Cylpericus, Lotharius Magnus (Lothair of France). The Carolingian dynasty begins with the fictional double portrait of Blithild and Ansbert, followed by Sancta Boda, Pippin II the Middle, Pippin III Younger, Carolus (Carloman of East Francia) and Carolus Magnus (Charlemagne).

Charlemagne is followed by the first East Frankish king Ludowicus (Louis II of Germany) and the founder of the West Frankish Empire, Carolus Calvus (Charles the Bald), then Ludowicus Balbus (Louis the Pious), Gerberga and Lambertus the Bearded (cum barba), Gottfried, and the founder of the Ottonian dynasty Heinricus (Henry the Fowler) with his wife Mathilde (Matilda of Ringelheim). The Brabant dukes, who formed a connecting line to the Luxembourg dynasty (John I, Duke of Brabant and his ancestors), are listed in sequence. Luxembourg portraits begin with Henry VII. John of Luxembourg, Eliška Přemyslovna, Charles IV (3 times) and Blanche of Valois follow. Charles IV acted ostentatiously as the supreme ruler of the Christian world, in his own conception therefore also "the reigning Christ on earth"

=== Significance of the Family Tree for Charles IV ===
The compilation of a genealogy served to establish Charles IV's claim to the imperial crown, and in this respect he was no exception among European ruling families. He summoned the Italian priest and traveller Giovanni de' Marignolli to Prague and commissioned him to write a chronicle that would place Bohemian history in the context of world history. Marignolli's chronicle is temporally related to the conception of the Family Tree. Charles IV was apparently influenced by his great-uncle, Archbishop of Trier and Elector Baldwin of Luxembourg, who similarly documented the claim to the imperial crown for his brother Henry VII. The imperial majesty, achieved with the help of the Pope, Charles IV also felt it necessary to defend in the eyes of the German nobility, who were not in favour of him. The Franciscan William of Ockham referred to him at the time as the "Pope´s King" (pfaffenkönig). Charles IV wanted to return to the conception of the Holy Roman Empire from the time of its origins.

After his return from his Roman coronation tour, Charles IV also had the great hall of Prague Castle decorated with a gallery of panel paintings featuring figures of the rulers of the four well-known medieval monarchies and the emperors of Rome and Constantinople. In total, there may have been as many as 120 paintings that have not survived.

=== Successors ===
- Master Theodoric
- Master of the Emmaus Cycle
- Master of Antiphonary from Stift Vorau
- Sketchbook of Erlangen (1460s), Universitätsbibliothek Erlangen

== Sources ==
- Kateřina Kubínová, Emauzský cyklus / Emmaus Cycle, 389 s., cz, en, Prague 2012, ISBN 978-80-86890-36-4
- Barbara Drake Boehm, Jirí Fajt (eds.), Prague, The Crown of Bohemia, 1347-1437, Metropolitan Museum of Art 2005, p. 48 ISBN 978-0-300-11138-5
- Jiří Fajt (ed.), Magister Theodoricus, dvorní malíř císaře Karla IV. / Magister Theodoricus, Court Painter to Emperor Charles IV, National Gallery in Prague 1997, ISBN 80-7035-142-X
- Homolka Jaromír, Umělecká výzdoba paláce a menší věže hradu Karlštejna / Artistic decoration of the palace and smaller tower of Karlštejn Castle, pp. 95–154, in: Jiří Fajt, Magister Theodoricus, court painter to Emperor Charles IV, National Gallery in Prague 1997
- Homolka Jaromír, Malíři a dílny pracující na výzdobě kaple sv. Kříže vedle Mistra Theodorika / Painters and workshops working on the decoration of the Chapel of the Holy Cross next to Master Theodoricus, pp. 350–368, in Jiří Fajt, Magister Theodoricus, court painter to Emperor Charles IV, National Gallery in Prague 1997
- Fajt Jiří, Royt Jan, Umělecká výzdoba velké věže hradu Karlštejna / Artistic Decoration of the Great Tower of Karlštejn Castle, pp. 155–269, in: Jiří Fajt, Magister Theodoricus, court painter to Emperor Charles IV, National Gallery in Prague 1997
- Rudolf Chadraba, Profetický historismus Karla IV. a přemyslovská tradice / Profetic Historicism of Charles IV and the Přemyslid Tradition, pp. 421–454, in Vaněček V, (ed.), Karolus Quartus, Charles University Prague 1984
- Karel Stejskal, Umění na dvoře Karla IV / Art at the Court of Charles IV, Artia Prague 1978
- Albert Kutal, České gotické umění / Czech Gothic Art, Obelisk Prague 1972
- Vlasta Dvořáková, Dobroslava Menclová, Karlštejn, SNKLHU, Prague 1965
- Jan Krofta, K problematice karlštejnských maleb / On the problem of Karlštejn paintings, Umění VI, 1958, pp. 2–30
- Antonín Friedl, Mikuláš Wurmser, mistr královských portrétů na Karlštejně / Mikuláš Wurmser, master of royal portraits at Karlštejn, SNKLHU Prague 1956
- Josef Neuwirth, Der Bildercyklus der Luxemburger Stammbaumes aus Karlstein: mit 16 Lichtdrucktafeln, Prag Calve 1897
- Jan Erazim Wocel, Památky archeologické III, Prague 1859
