= Karlštejn (Beroun District) =

- Market town
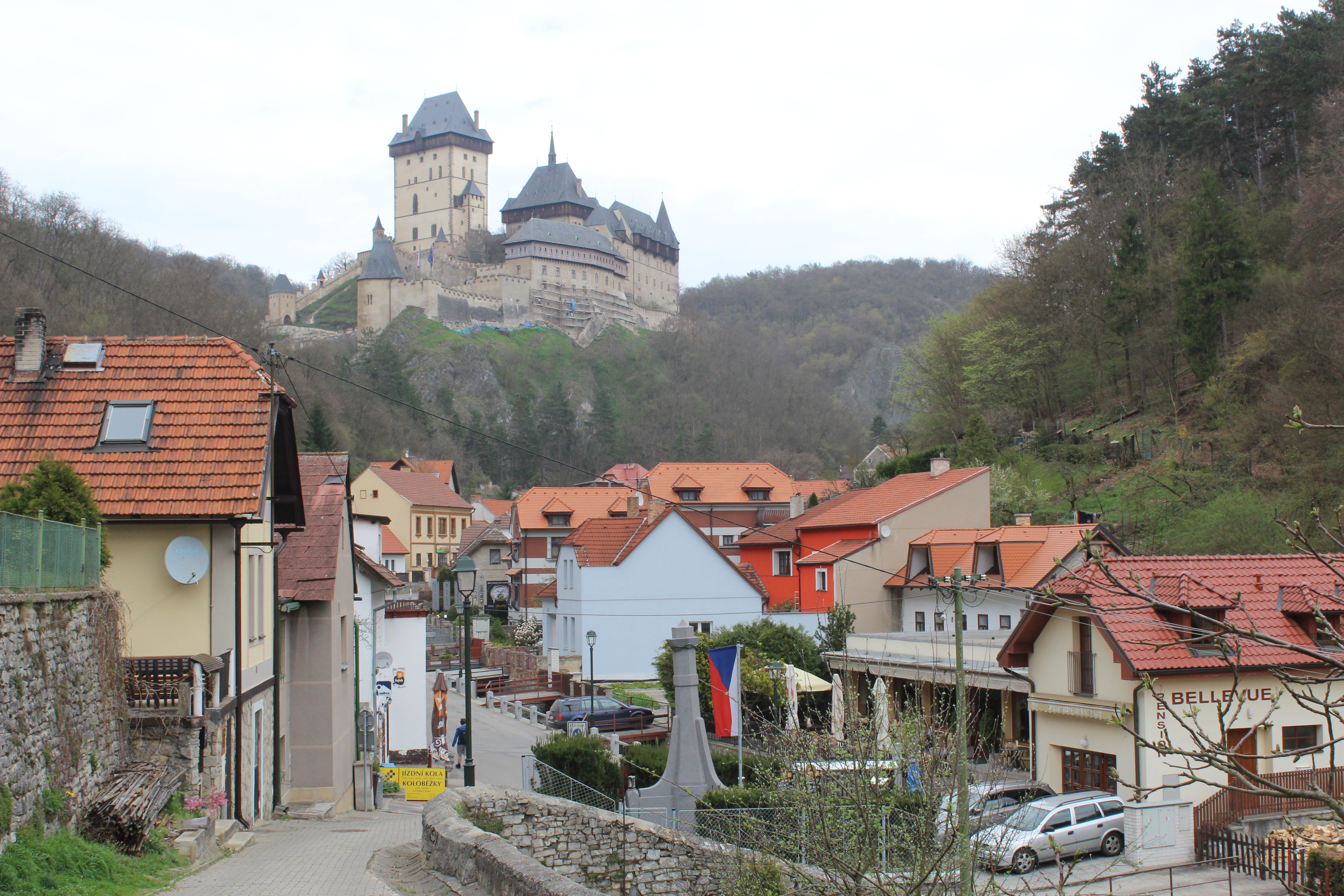
- View towards the Karlštejn Castle

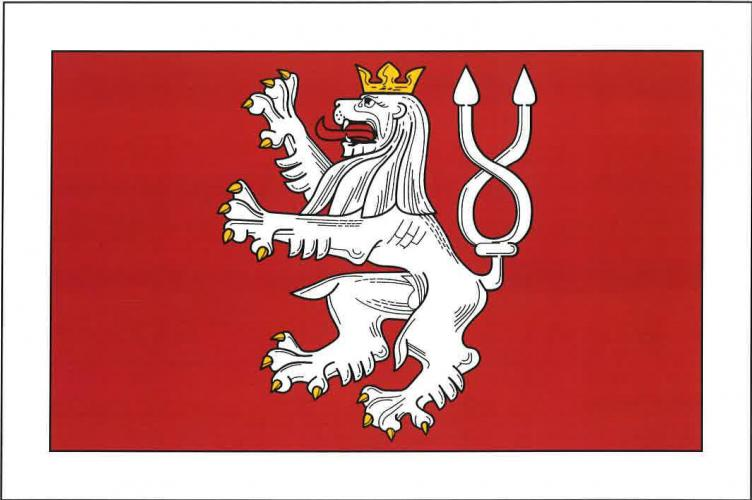
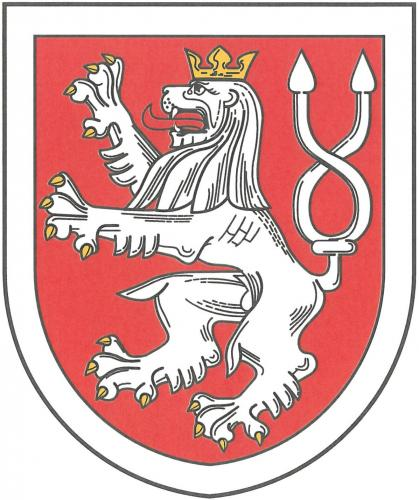
- Flag Coat of arms

- Location in the Czech Republic
- Coordinates: 49°55′56″N 14°10′31″E
- Country: Czech Republic
- Region: Central Bohemian
- District: Beroun
- First mentioned: 1348

Area
  - Total: 12.08 km^{2} (4.66 sq mi)
- Elevation: 345 m (1,132 ft)

Population (2026-01-01)
  - Total: 833
  - Density: 69.0/km^{2} (179/sq mi)
- Time zone: UTC+1 (CET)
  - Summer (DST): UTC+2 (CEST)
- Postal code: 267 18
- Website: www.mestys-karlstejn.cz

Karlštejn (Czech pronunciation: [ˈkarl̩ʃtɛjn]) is a market town in Beroun District in the Central Bohemian Region of the Czech Republic. It has about 800 inhabitants. The market town is located on the Berounka River in the Hořovice Uplands.

Karlštejn is known for the medieval Karlštejn Castle, which is protected as a national cultural monument and is among the most visited castles in the country.

== Etymology ==
The settlement was named after Karlštejn Castle. The initial German name of the castle was Karlstein, meaning "Charles' castle" (literally "Charles' stone").

== Geography ==
Karlštejn is located about 9 kilometres (6 mi) east of Beroun and 16 km (10 mi) southwest of Prague. It lies in the Hořovice Uplands. The highest point is the hill Velká hora at 423 m (1,388 ft) above sea level. The built-up area is situated in the valley of the Berounka River and its tributary, the stream Budňanský potok. The entire municipal territory lies within the Bohemian Karst Protected Landscape Area.

== History ==
The predecessor of Karlštejn was Budňany, a settlement founded in 1348 by craftsmen who built the Karlštejn Castle. In 1952, the modern market town of Karlštejn was created by merging Budňany and Poučník municipalities and named after the castle.

== Demographics ==
Historical population

Year	Pop.	±%
1869	780	—
1880	748	−4.1%
1890	815	+9.0%
1900	818	+0.4%
1910	865	+5.7%

Year	Pop.	±%
1921	895	+3.5%
1930	1,043	+16.5%
1950	1,133	+8.6%
1961	1,177	+3.9%
1970	1,082	−8.1%

Year	Pop.	±%
1980	899	−16.9%
1991	817	−9.1%
2001	745	−8.8%
2011	799	+7.2%
2021	871	+9.0%

Source: Censuses

== Transport ==
Karlštejn is located on the railway line Prague–Beroun.

== Sights ==
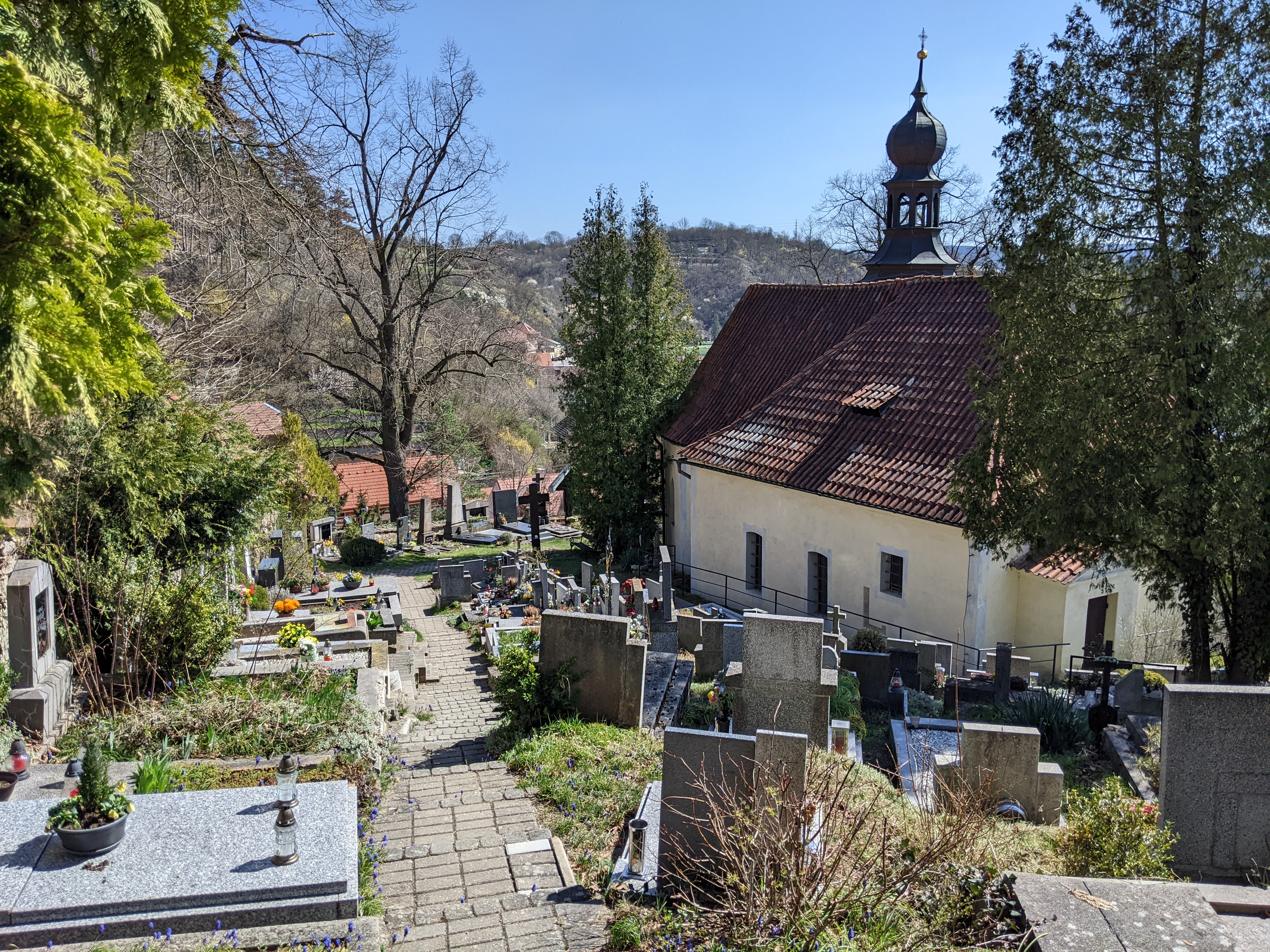
Church of Saint Palmatius

Karlštejn is known for the large Gothic Karlštejn Castle. It is one of the most famous and most frequently visited castles in the Czech Republic (8th most visited in 2025). It is protected as a national cultural monument.

The Church of Saint Palmatius was founded in 1351 as a result of the construction of the castle. It was rebuilt to its current Baroque form in the 18th century.

== Notable people ==
- Kateřina of Komárov (15??–1534), serial killer; lived and murdered here
- Marie Louise von Scheliha (1904–2003), German noblewoman

== Twin towns – sister cities ==
Karlštejn is twinned with:

- Althen-des-Paluds, France
- Montecarlo, Italy
- Reichenbach im Vogtland, Germany
