= Master Theodoric =

Bohemian painter (c. 1328–1381)

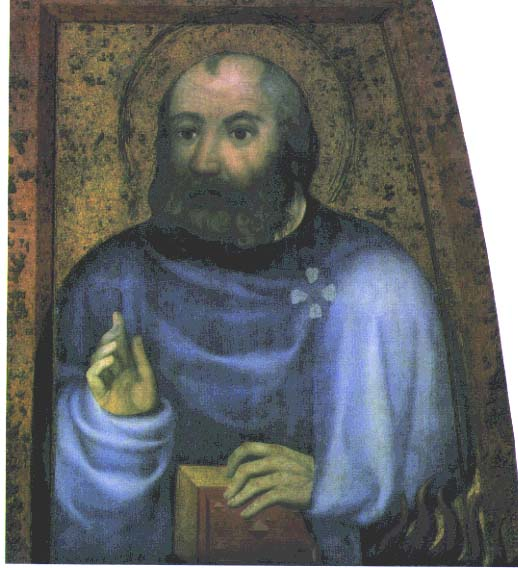
- Apostle Barnabas (c. 1365), a supposed self-portrait
- Born: before 1328?, Italy?
- Died: before 3 March 1381; Prague, Bohemia
- Occupation: Court painter of Charles IV

Master Theodoric, in Latin Magister Theodoricus (before 1328? – before 3 March 1381; active c. 1360 – c. 1380), was a Czech painter. He is the best-documented Gothic painter in Bohemia. He was the favourite court painter of Charles IV, Holy Roman Emperor, and the first Bohemian painter whose name can be linked to a body of work. Theodoric is considered the chief representative of the phase of International Gothic known as the "Soft style". His masterpiece is the Chapel of the Holy Cross at Charles's newly completed Karlštejn Castle, near Prague, containing a large series of slightly over-lifesize, half-length panel portraits of saints and other notable figures on a gold ground. The whole decoration of the chapel was commissioned in 1359 and completed over a number of years. The decoration of the Chapel of the Holy Cross was unique and unprecedented north of the Alps. Theodoric's oeuvre is not comparable to anything in European art after the mid-14th century (1360s).

== Life ==
He most likely came to Prague from the Rhineland (workshop of William of Cologne?) following a study trip to northern Italy in the 1350s. Pujmanová states that in about 1309, a sculptor described as Magister Theodoricus de Alemania—who could have been an ancestor of him and his brother, the painter Giletto—was active at the court of Charles II of Anjou in Naples. (Note: "magister Theodoricus de Alemannia et Gilectus frater eius exposuerunt noviter nobis quod pro scultura et pictura figurae piae personae clarae memoriae domini avi nostri statuta fuerunt eis gagia") The waiting period for civic rights in Prague was three years, and a newcomer was not able to become a member of the fraternity of painters straightaway. The date he was entered in the list of the Prague painters' fraternity (Brotherhood of Saint Luke, established 1346), where he was described as a superior (primus magister) and as malerius imperatoris, is uncertain. Earlier it was assumed to be 1348; however, it is possible that an honorary function was only offered to him when he executed the painting of the royal palace at Prague Castle in 1360.

In 1359, he is mentioned as malerius imperatoris and the owner of a house in Hradčany in the Records of the Hradčany town. His house was mentioned once again in 1368 (house no. 185/IV above Úvoz on Hradčany Square). Between 1359 and 1367, he worked as the leading court painter of Charles IV in Prague and at Karlštejn Castle. The emperor called his painter and courtier Pictor noster et familiaris. In a special document of 28 April 1367, Charles IV certified that Theodoric's court and fields in the village of Mořina would be freed of all taxes and other charges. This privilege also applied to Theodoric's heirs and was granted in recognition of his decoration of the royal chapel at Karlštejn. Theodoric's court was mentioned again in 1381, when it was sold, in a letter by Wenceslaus IV. Mikuláš Mendl of Jílové, father of the goldsmith Jorg, and the goldsmith Jan Waczenser, sold the court to Zdena, the widow of Ješek Mráz of Lazevice. This document is the only one that establishes Theodoric's death before 8 March 1381 and indicates that he left no descendants.

== Work ==
Theodoric's magnum opus is a collection of panel paintings and wall paintings that were done on the commission of Charles IV for the Chapel of the Holy Cross at Karlštejn. Altogether, there are 129 works, all of saints, prophets, or angels. The National Gallery in Prague stated that they have "only few equals in the world: we believe that it is no exaggeration to say that they bear comparison with such artistic monuments and phenomena as the Arena in Padua, the churches at Assisi or Sta. Croce in Florence and the palace of the popes in Avignon."

Known for his bold and vigorous style, he is seen as a central figure in the development of Bohemian art. Like many other Gothic painters, he used very bright, attention-grabbing colours and bold lines. He painted powerful figures in small frames, conveying a sense of monumentality to the viewer. Famous for his use of light and reflection, he created the illusion of endless space in his work by allowing light to travel beyond the frame. Art historians have disagreed on several aspects of Theodoric's career. One historian noted that Theodoric was a "unique phenomenon" whose works could not be explained by stylistic evolution, as there were no precedents for his artwork, suggesting that he may have been self-taught. Another scholar holds an opposite opinion—that he was influenced by both Italian and French contemporary art.

Theodoric followed on from the work of his predecessor in the service of Charles IV, the Master of the Luxembourg Genealogy, who painted the decoration of the imperial castle-palace at Karlštejn and the 'relic scenes' in the Chapel of the Virgin Mary between 1356 and 1357. This master was familiar with Franco-Flemish art of the 1350s and brought major innovations to mural painting in Bohemia. Several panel paintings ascribed to Theodoric's workshop repeat the typology of faces and patterns of movement in figures of the Genealogy. According to Homolka, two heavily damaged panel paintings of SS Peter and Paul from the Chapel of the Holy Cross could have directly originated in the workshop of the Master of the Luxembourg Genealogy, since the technology of their foundation layers is more typical of mural painting and thus differs significantly from the other paintings.

Theodoric's workshop carried out the unique overall decoration of the Chapel of the Holy Cross at Karlštejn Castle between 1360 and 1365. The chapel belongs to the tradition of lavishly decorated reliquary chapels that include the emperor chapel in Constantinople, the Sancta Sanctorum in the Lateran Palace, and the Sainte Chapelle in Paris. The decoration comprises 129 (originally 130) panel paintings in four rows, portraying the half-length figures of male saints, female saints, and prophets who represented the 'Army of Heaven' guarding the relics kept in the chapel. Several of the picture frames had small openings into which reliquaries could be inserted. The depiction of the saints in the Holy Cross Chapel was directly linked to the veneration of their relics. The presence of relics of the Passion perhaps served to guarantee that on his return, Christ would descend to the chapel.

With the stylisation of the figures, the abandoning of the Gothic linear style, and the modelling of the faces and drapery using light and shade, Theodoric's paintings surpass the preceding artistic style. It is clear that he was acquainted with French grisaille painting. The pictures can be attributed to Theodoric on the basis of analysing the underdrawings and comparing the execution of the painting. The drawn designs of the compositions, details of the faces and drapery, as well as the overall completion of the most important portraits in the Chapel of the Holy Cross, were ascribed to Theodoric. Theodoric's brush drawing on the heads of the paintings is delicate and firm. On the draperies, it is strong and energetic and overlaps onto the frame.

Study of the typology of the heads showed that the shape of the head and the details of the face (e.g. eyes, nose) are completely identical in a number of cases, as though they originated through tracing. However, some of the faces of saints captivate the viewer's attention with their prominent, seemingly individualized features and psychologized expressions, which anticipate portrait painting of the 15th century. The portrait of St Luke the Evangelist might even be the self-portrait of Theodoric himself.

Specialised craftsmen took care of a series of secondary tasks such as preparing the picture panels, the plastic decoration, and goldsmith's elements. There are no records of the painters employed at Theodoric's workshop; however, there must have been several of them judging by the scale of the commission and the short timeframe of execution, as well as by the ascertained types of underdrawings, confirmed by infrared reflectography. Certain art historians even suppose that several masters and their workshop collaborators were involved.

In the Chapel of the Holy Cross, there are two places that testify to the juxtaposition of different painting styles. They can be found in the perfectly executed preparatory drawings on the altar wall that are then repeated in a simpler form or in mirror reverse in the underdrawings of the paintings. Theodoric's predecessor, the Master of the Luxembourg Genealogy, in all likelihood created the drawn designs on the wall of the Chapel of the Holy Cross. Theodoric presumably devised the concept of the entire chapel about 1360, establishing the composition and palette of all the paintings. His distinctive painting style can be identified in several portraits of the prophets, kings, and knights that are part of the overall series.

Innovations in the form of painted still lifes appear in the panel paintings of the Church Fathers that originate in Theodoric's workshop (Saint Augustine, Saint Ambrose, Saint Gregory). Clearly made by another talented artist, these paintings stand out with their unusual degree of realism, the spatial design of their still lifes, and their sophisticated colour scheme. With these qualities, they anticipate the development of painting progressing towards the early 15th century and the northern European Renaissance.

Master Bertram, who was later active in Hamburg, evidently worked in Theodoric's workshop. The Master of the Třeboň Altarpiece and the artist who painted the Votive Panel of Jan Očko of Vlašim most probably also came out of Theodoric's workshop. In terms of its technology and composition, the mural painting of the Adoration of the Three Kings in the Saxon Chapel of St Vitus Cathedral is similar to Theodoric's paintings. According to Homolka, the illuminators of the A2 and A3 Chapter House Bibles had much in common with Theodoric or else came out of his workshop. Although the International Gothic "Soft style" had no direct successors, the context of the workshop itself influenced succeeding generations of Bohemian Gothic painters.

=== The technique of Theodoric's panel paintings ===
The preparation of the panels (beechwood), including a double-layered siliceous and chalk base, is identical to practice in France and Germany but doesn't appear in Italy. The preparatory black underdrawing in brush is linear and highly detailed in places. In the final painting, however, numerous divergences have been found, for example in the position of hands. The preparatory drawing is covered with a layer of oil-based lead white paint. This layer also reflects diffuse light falling on it through translucent lazure layers and shines through the uppermost parts of the drapery. The painting itself is executed in egg tempera alternating with layers of oil. The oil base enabled both the arranging of contrasting colour layers and the gradual modelling of the volume. Theodoric's painting is characterised by laying down of semi-lazure layers with the help of the slow-drying oil (possibly walnut) base that enabled wet-on-wet painting. In the flesh tones, the moist oil base allows the modelling of smooth transitions into a single layer by adding pigment alla prima (Charlemagne).

It was necessary for other specialised artists, who created a complex system of decorations, to collaborate on the final form of the pictures. These included relief decoration of the background and frame of the pictures (pastiglia), glued plastic decoration, small goldsmith's applications cast from tin and lead into moulds, the gilding of the background, and goldsmith's products such as small crosses attached to the panel with silver nails.

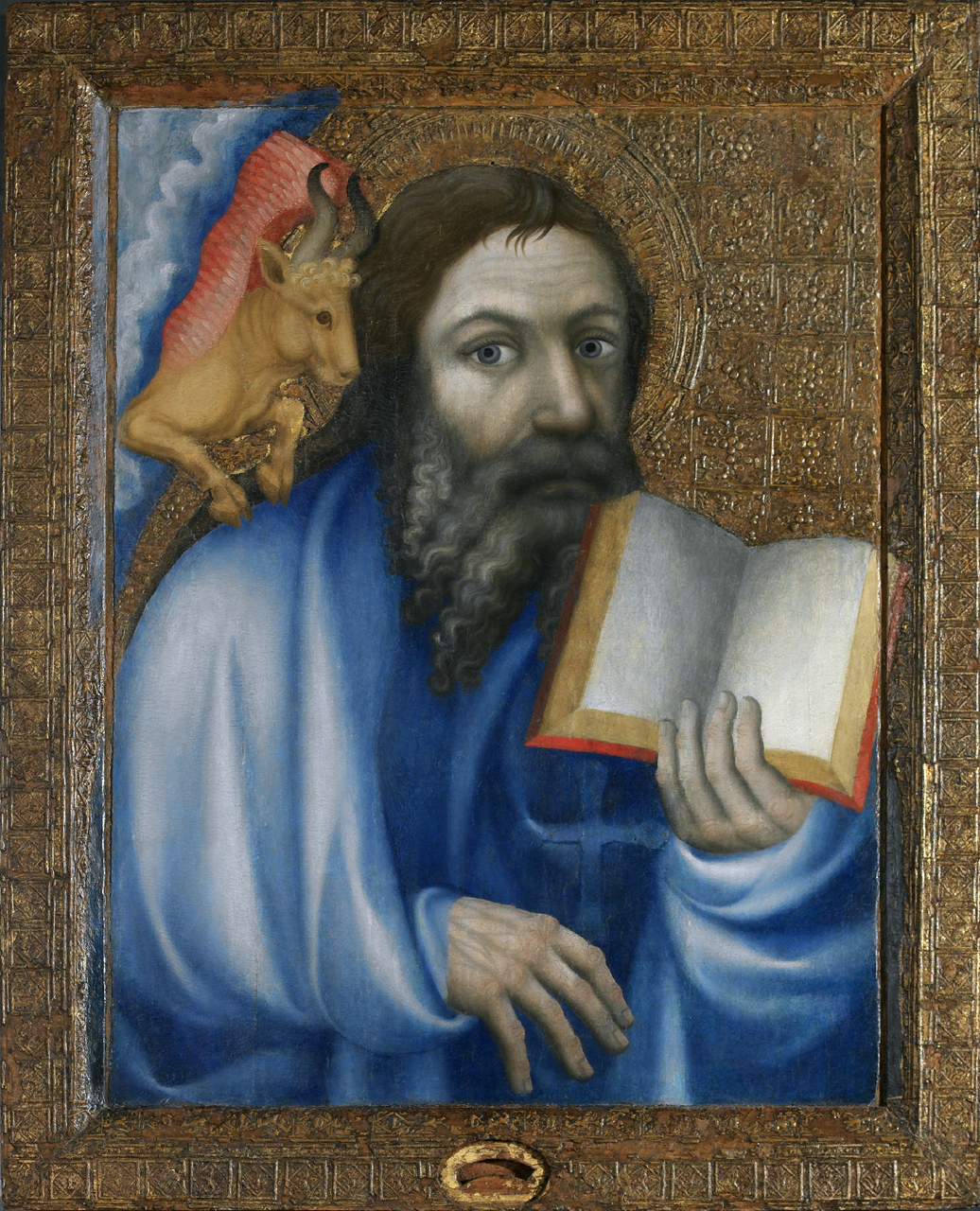
St Luke, National Gallery Prague

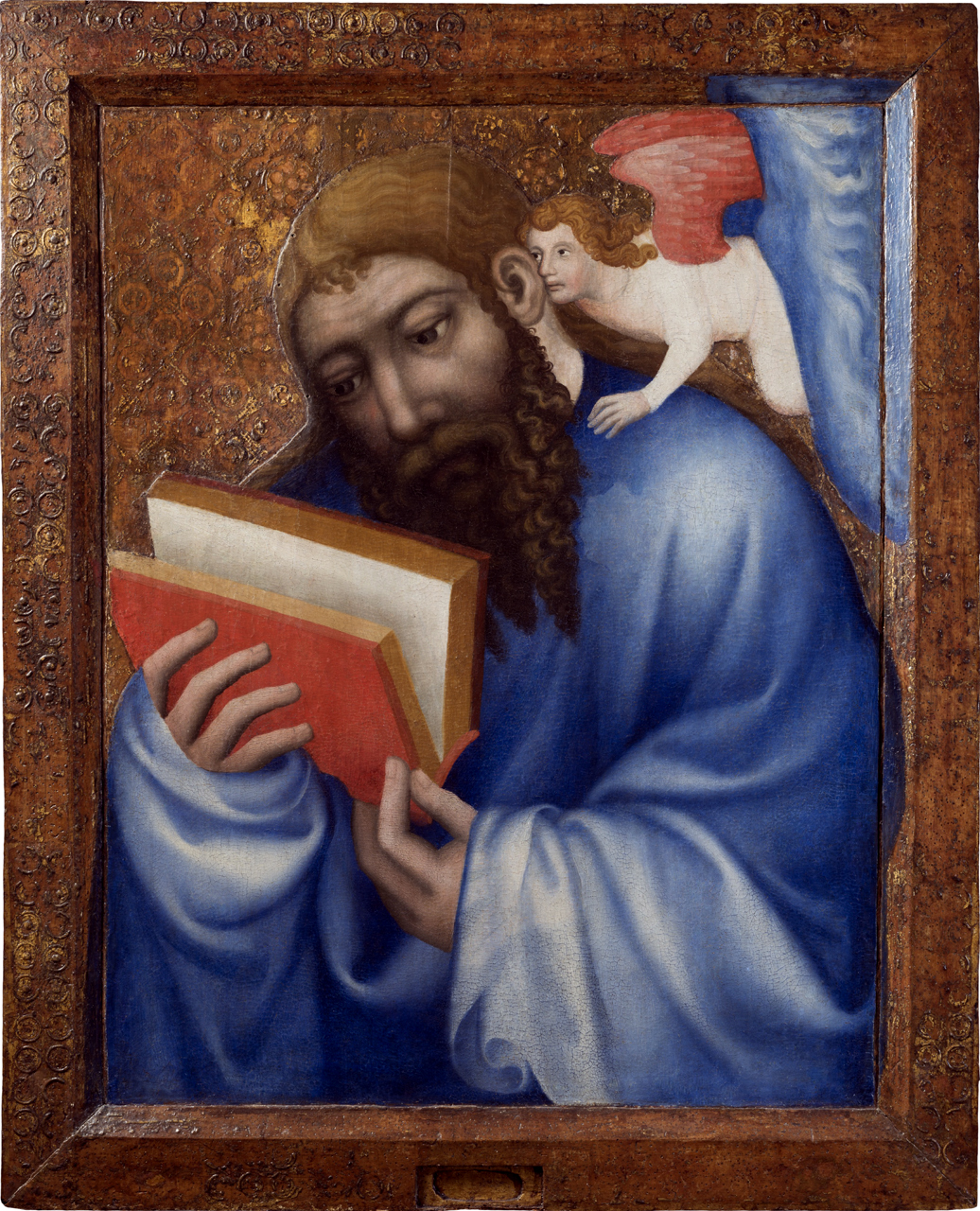
Saint Matthew the Evangelist, National Gallery Prague

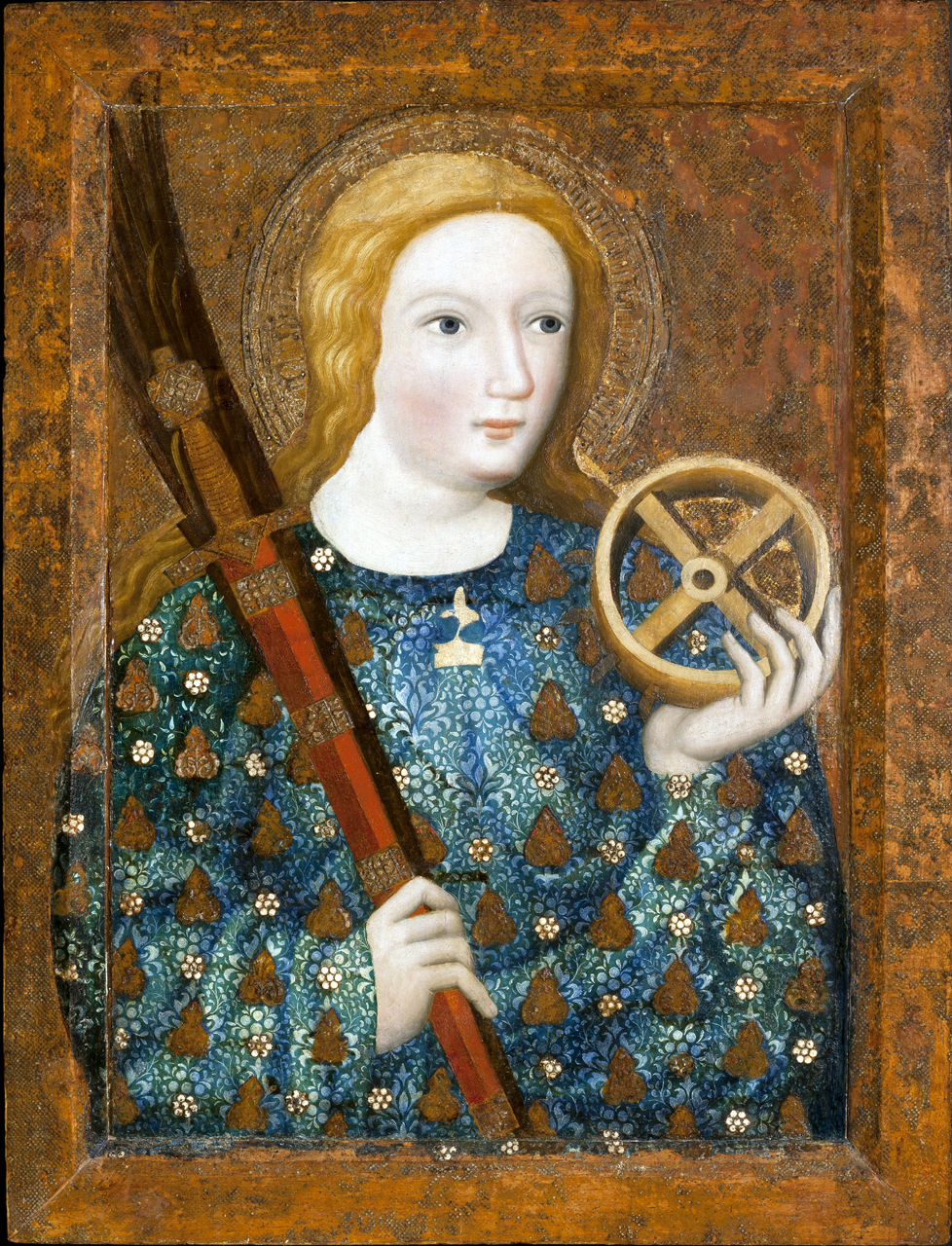
Catherine of Alexandria, National Gallery Prague

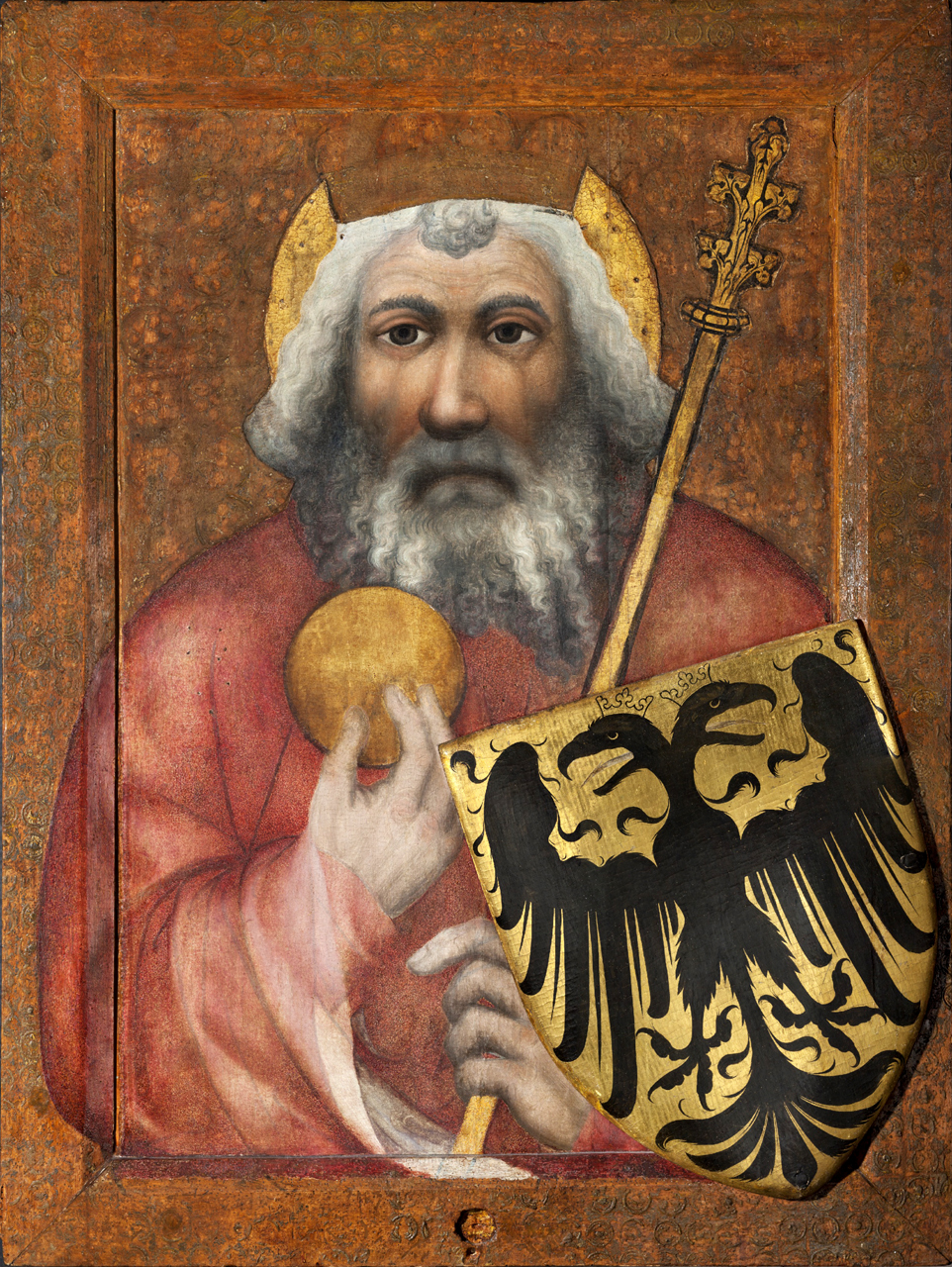
Charlemagne, National Gallery Prague

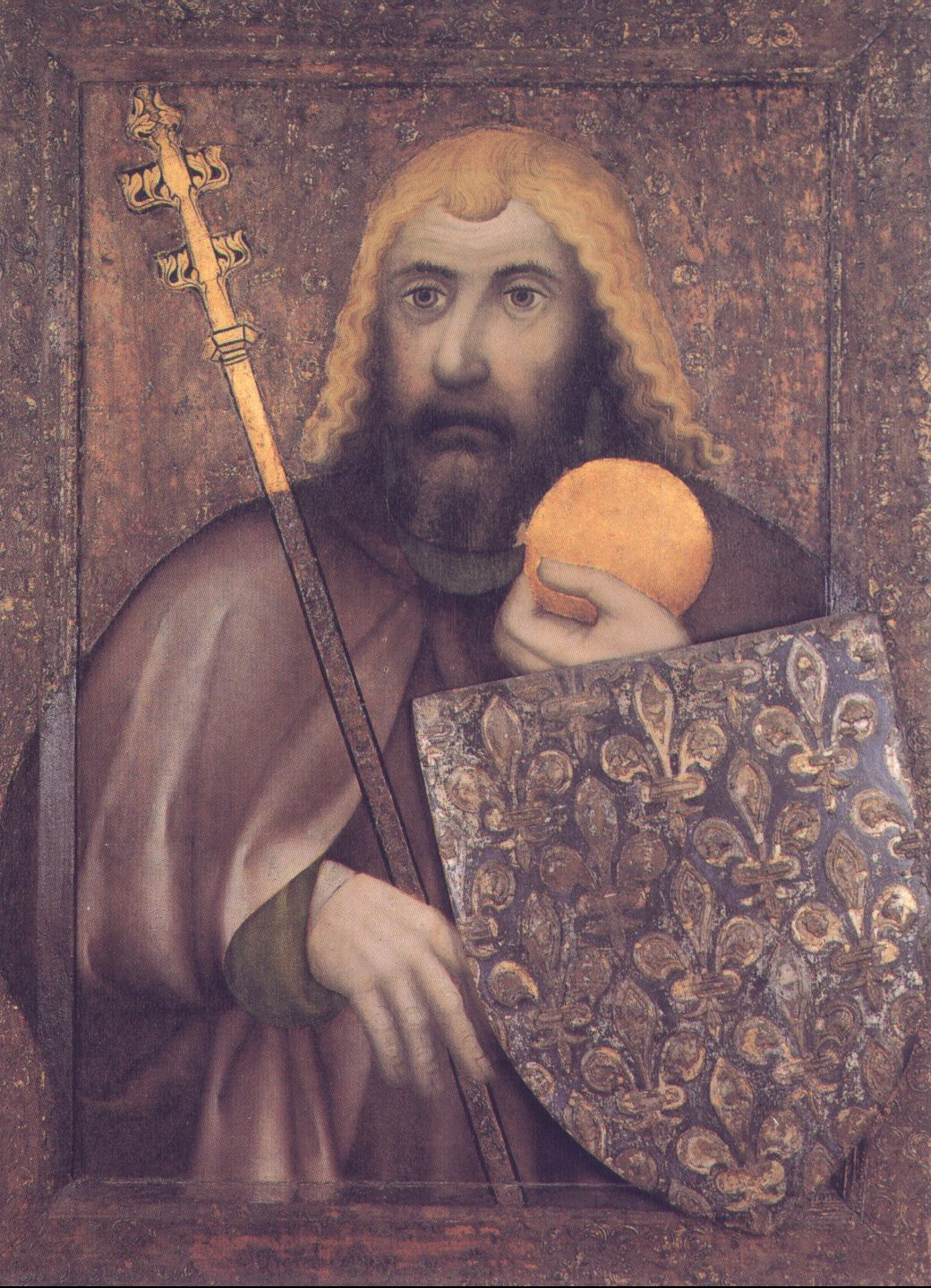
Saint Louis IX of France

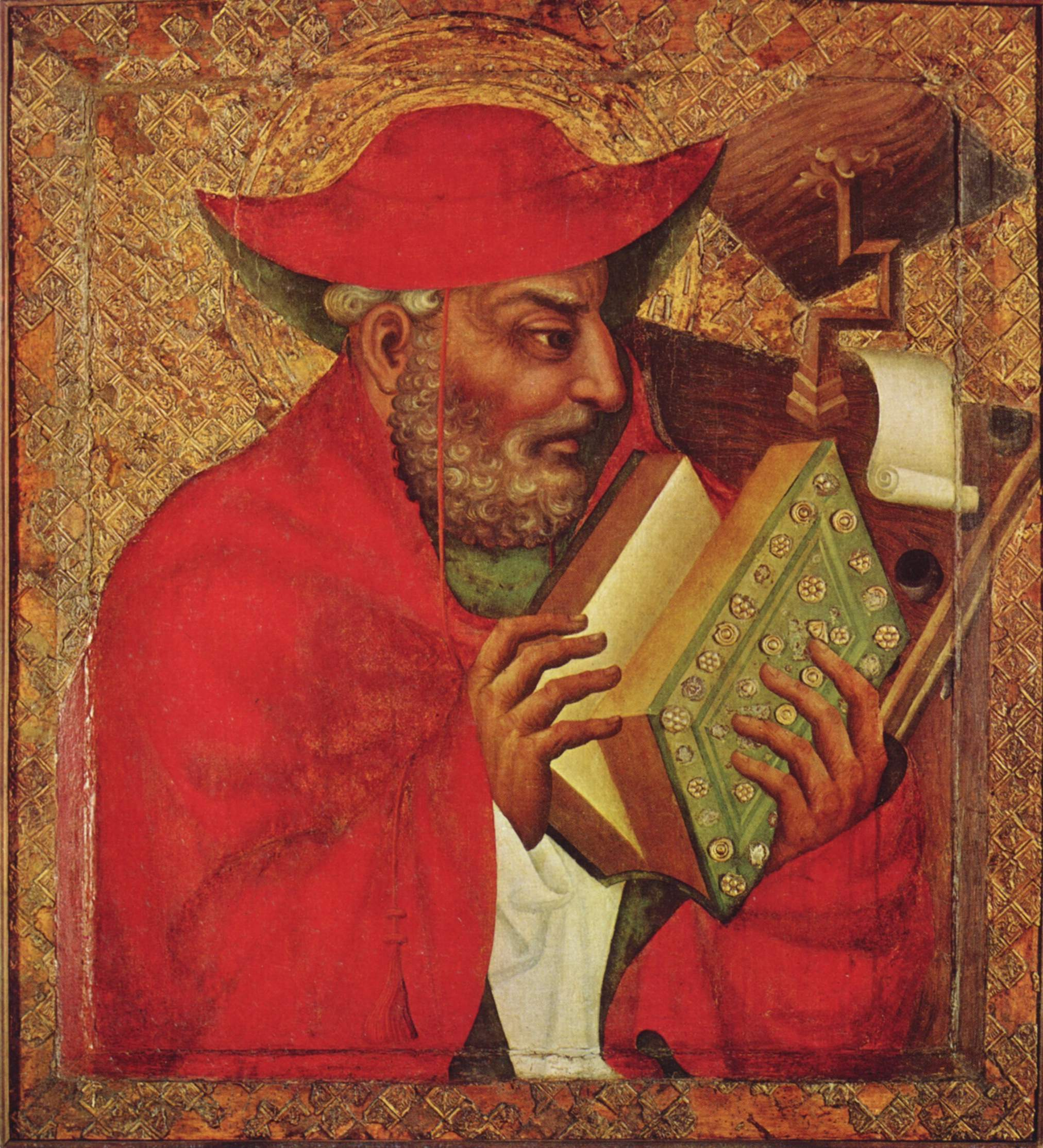
Saint Jerome, Chapel of the Holy Cross, Karlštejn

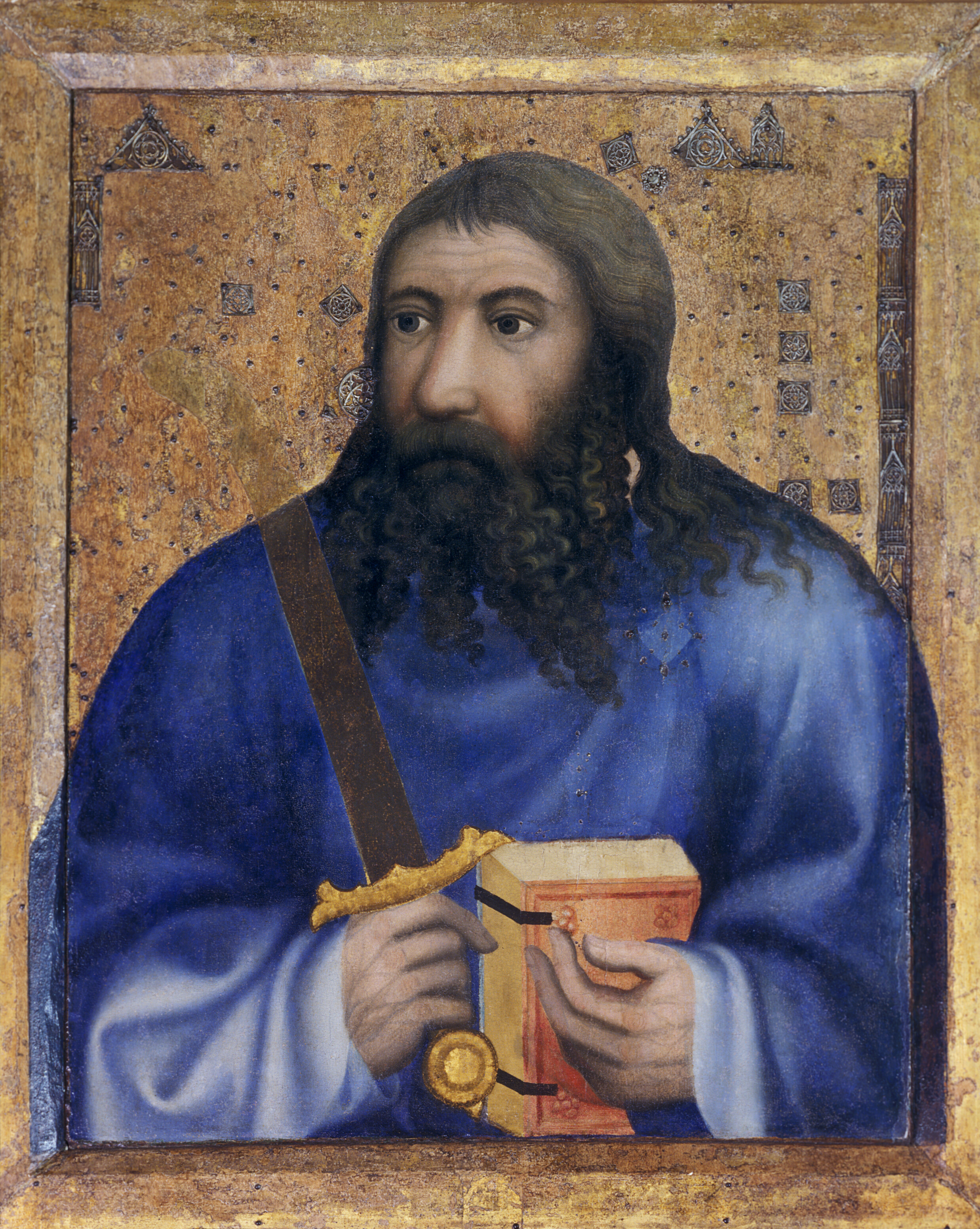
Saint Simon, Chapel of the Holy Cross, Karlštejn

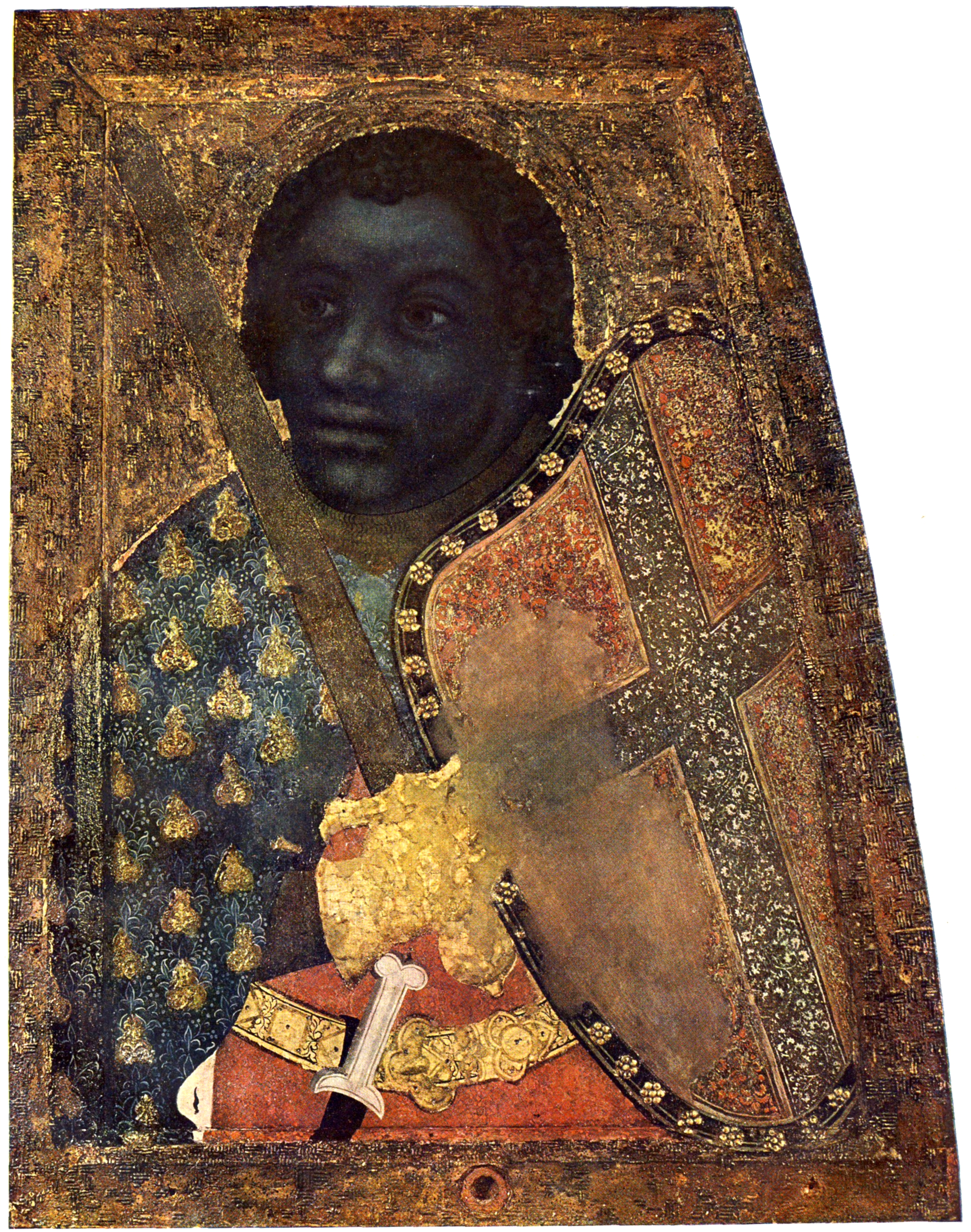
Saint Maurice, Chapel of the Holy Cross, Karlštejn

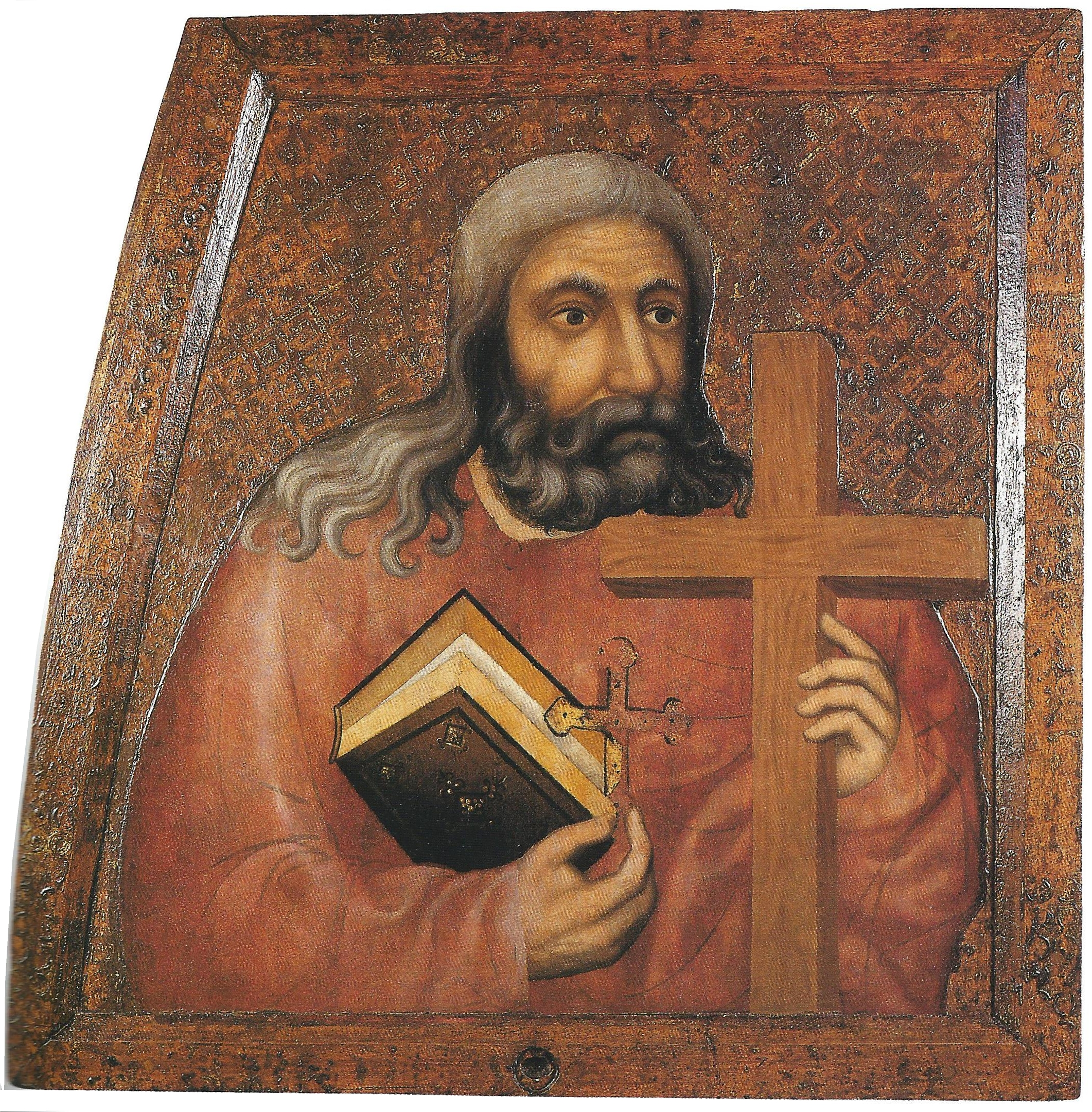
St Jude Thaddaeus, Chapel of the Holy Cross, Karlštejn

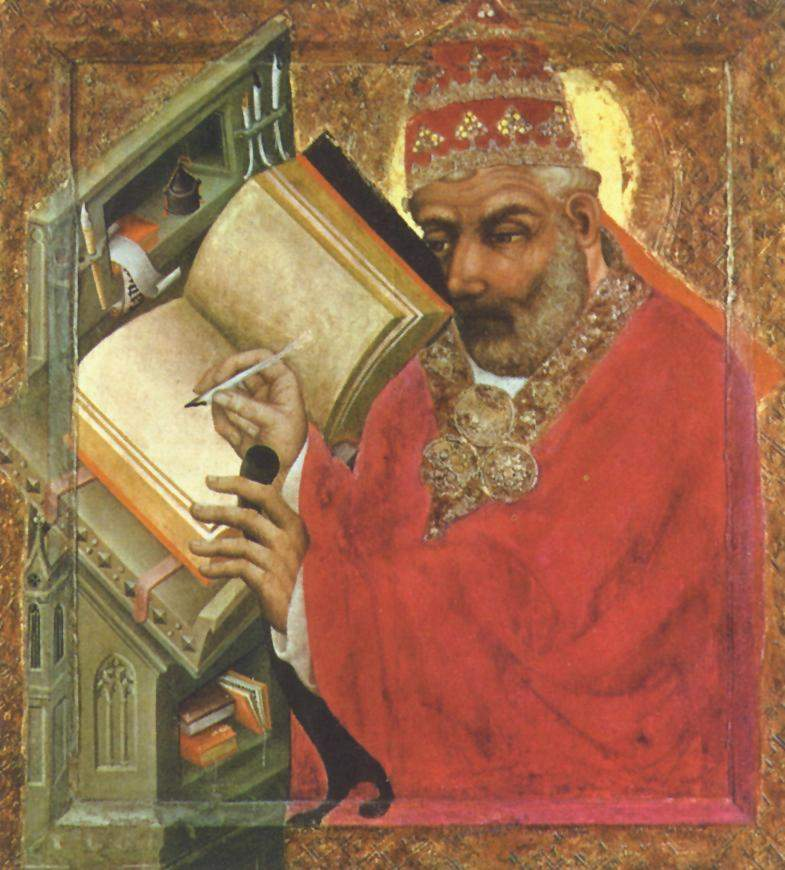
St Gregory, National Gallery Prague

=== Mural Paintings in the Chapel of the Holy Cross at Karlštejn Castle ===
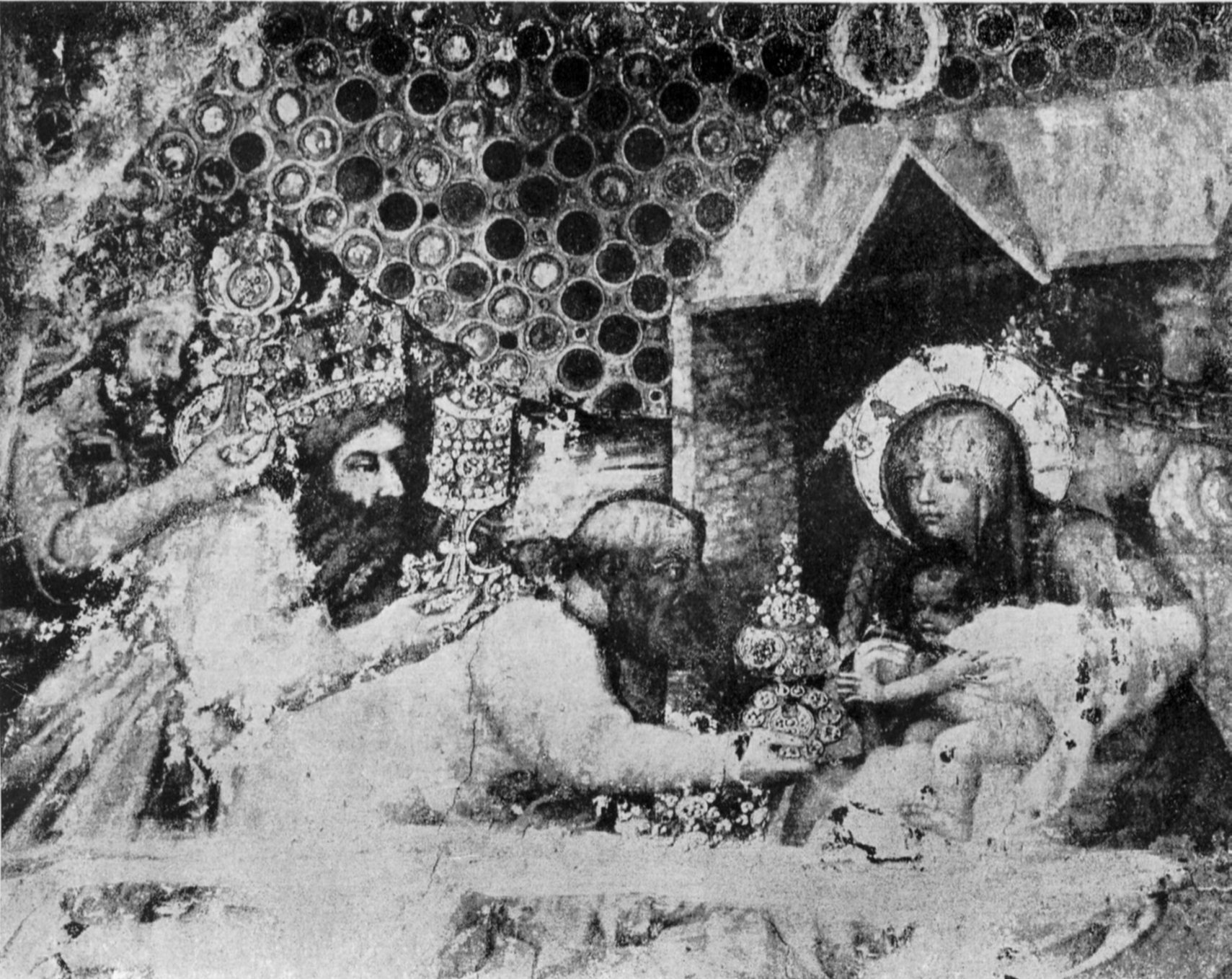
Adoration of the Kings

Mural paintings in the Chapel of the Holy Cross feature the apocalyptic prophecy—anticipation of the Second Coming of Christ on Judgment Day. The walls opposite each other on the vaults of the window niches of the chapel are ascribed to Master Theodoric and his workshop. The drapery of the figures is characterised by the soft modelling of light. With its muted colour tones, it has an affinity to the grisaille painting method. The faces are closely related to several of Theodoric's panel paintings and repeatedly feature the characteristic motif of hair and whiskers coiled into individual strands. The painting is embellished with gilded relief decorations and the backgrounds of the scenes are filled out with gold plastic star shapes.

==== The apocalyptic God in a mandorla is surrounded by choirs of angels (the west niche) ====
The painting's colour scheme is adapted to the opposite wall depicting the Adoration of the Twenty-four Old Men (twelve prophets and twelve apostles, or 24 world rulers) ascribed to the Master of the Luxembourg Genealogy. The monumental painting of God is executed in grisaille. In his hand, God is holding seven stars and a book above which there hang seven candleholders.

==== The Annunciation to the Virgin Mary (north-east niche, north vault) ====
With the high quality of its execution, the scene of the Annunciation has much in common with the most advanced techniques used in panel paintings by Theodoric's workshop (St Ambrose). Archangel Gabriel's wings are made from strips of tin sheet decorated with lazure painting and gilded plastic decoration. The space is deepened by polygonal Gothic architecture of a cathedral and by the Virgin Mary's diagonal reading stand.

==== The Adoration of the Three Kings (north-east niche, south vault) ====
The largest and best-preserved painting depicts the Holy Family in a hut with animals and three kings bearing gifts. The high artistic quality of the execution, the specific typology of the faces, and the painting style attest to Master Theodoric as the artist of this work. The painting is characterised above all by the careful execution of details (the figure of the Infant Christ, the strands of whiskers and hair, the woven wicker fence, the plastically executed royal crown, and fine gifts). The figure of the third king, considered to be a crypto-portrait of Charles IV, is the earliest such appearance of a monarch in European art.

==== Christ meeting Mary Magdalene and Martha / The anointing of Christ in the home of Simon (south-east niche, north vault) ====
The paintings are heavily damaged; however, the chiaroscuro modelling of the clothes, the typology of the faces, and the execution of the hands have closely related counterparts in the panel paintings of Master Theodoric.

==== The Raising of Lazarus / Noli me tangere (south-east niche, south vault) ====
The rich composition with its landscape scenery in the background is badly damaged; however, numerous similar formal analogies rank it alongside Master Theodoric's mural paintings in the Chapel of the Holy Cross.

== Sources (en.) ==
=== Books and chapters ===
- Barbara Drake Boehm, Jiří Fajt, Prague, The Crown of Bohemia, 1347-1437, 384 pp., Metropolitan Museum of Art Series, 2005, ISBN 978-0300111385
- Jiří Fajt (ed.), Magister Theodoricus, Court Painter to Emperor Charles IV: The Pictorial Decoration of the Shrines at Karlstejn Castle, 549 pages, National Gallery Publications 1998, ISBN 9788070351604
- Hana Hlaváčková, "The drawings on the walls of the Chapel of the Holy Cross in the Great tower", in: Jiří Fajt (ed.), Magister Theodoricus, Court Painter to Emperor Charles IV: The Pictorial Decoration of the Shrines at Karlstejn Castle, 1998
- Hana Blochová, "The medieval art techniques of the painted decoration of Karlštejn", in: Jiří Fajt (ed.), Magister Theodoricus, Court Painter to Emperor Charles IV: The Pictorial Decoration of the Shrines at Karlstejn Castle, 1998, pp. 528–538
- Jaromír Homolka, "Painters and workshops involved in the pictorial decoration of the Chapel of the Holy Cross besides Master Theodoric", in: Jiří Fajt (ed.), Magister Theodoricus, Court Painter to Emperor Charles IV: The Pictorial Decoration of the Shrines at Karlstejn Castle, 1998, pp. 278–295
- Gerhard Schmidt, "Karlstein", in: K.M. Swoboda (ed.), Gothic in Böhmen, Munich 1969
- Vlasta Dvořáková, Master Theodoric, Odeon Prague 1967
- Antonín Friedl, Magister Theodoricus. Das Problem seiner malerischen Form, Artia Prague 1956

=== Articles ===
- Mojmír Hamsík, "Master Theodoric's Painting Technique and its Origin", Technologia Artis 2, 1992 online
- Vratislav Nejedlý, "The Fate of the Chapel of the Holy Rood at Karlštejn Castle in the Light of Written Sources", Technologia Artis 2, 1992 online
- Zora Grohmannová, "Master Theodoric's Paintings on Wood and their Restoration by the National Gallery", Bulletin of the National Gallery 1, 1991
- Zora Grohmannová, "Master Theodoric - The Crucifixion", Technologia Artis 2, 1992 online
- Radana Hamsíková, "Master Theodoric - St Claire", Technologia Artis 2, 1992 online
- Mojmír Hamsík, "Pastiglia - Origin and Their Technical History", Technologia Artis 2, 1992 online
- Věra Frömlová, "Preliminary Findings on the Historical Repairs to the Pictures", Technologia Artis 2, 1992 online
- Jindřich Tomek, Dorothea Pechová, "Analysis of the Wall Paintings in the Holy Rood Chapel at Karlštejn Castle", Technologia Artis 2, 1992 online
- Jiří Třeštík, "Figural Drawings in the Holy Rood Chapel, found under the panel Paintings, and New Discoveries", Technologia Artis 2, 1992 online
- Mojmír Hamsík, Jindřich Tomek, "Technical Parallels between the 14th-Century Mural and Panel paintings", Technologia Artis 2, 1992 online
- Hana Kohlová, "Further Results of the Investigation on Theodoric's Paintings", Technologia Artis 2, 1992 online
- Radana Hamsíková, "Master Theodoric's Preparatory Drawings", Technologia Artis 2, 1992 online
- Radana Hamsíková, "Theodoric's Workshop Practice: Composition and Form Patterns", Technologia Artis 3, 1993 online
- Hana Blochová, "Relief Decoration in Czech Painting of the 14th Century", Technologia Artis 3, 1993 online

=== Other (cs.) ===
- Jiří Fajt (ed.), Magister Theodoricus, dvorní malíř císaře Karla IV., 621 pp., Národní galerie v Praze 1997, ISBN 80-7035-142-X
- Jaromír Homolka, "Malíři a dílny pracující na výzdobě kaple sv. Kříže vedle Mistra Theodorika", pp. 350–368, in: Jiří Fajt (ed.), Magister Theodoricus, dvorní malíř císaře Karla IV., Národní galerie v Praze 1997
- Hana Hlaváčková, "Kresby na stěnách v kapli sv. Kříže ve Velké věži", pp. 270–279, in: Jiří Fajt (ed.), Magister Theodoricus, dvorní malíř císaře Karla IV., Národní galerie v Praze 1997
- Jiří Fajt, Hana Hlaváčková, Jaromír Homolka, Jan Royt, "Katalog kreseb na omítce a nástěnných maleb v kapli sv. Kříže", s. 547–577, in: Jiří Fajt (ed.), Magister Theodoricus, dvorní malíř císaře Karla IV., Národní galerie v Praze 1997
- Mojmír Hamsík, "Mistr Theodorik. Technologie malby a její historické souvislosti", pp. 578–579, in: Jiří Fajt (ed.), Magister Theodoricus, dvorní malíř císaře Karla IV., Národní galerie v Praze 1997
- Hana Blochová, "Výtvarné technologie a výzdoba kaple sv. Kříže", pp. 600–610, in: Jiří Fajt (ed.), Magister Theodoricus, dvorní malíř císaře Karla IV., Národní galerie v Praze 1997
- Pujmanová Olga, "Umění doby Karla IV. a jeho vztahy k Neapoli", pp. 217–240, in: Mezinárodní vědecká konference: Doba Karla IV. v dějinách národů ČSSR, Univerzita Karlova, Prague 1982
- Karel Stejskal, Umění na dvoře Karla IV., Artia Prague 1978
- Albert Kutal, České gotické umění, Obelisk Prague 1972
- Vlasta Dvořáková et al. Mistr Theodorik, SNKLU Prague 1967
- Vlasta Dvořáková, Dobroslava Menclová, Karlštejn, Státní nakladatelství krásné literatury a umění, Prague 1965
