= Karlštejn =

Gothic castle in the Czech Republic

Karlštejn Castle
- Hrad Karlštejn
- Central Bohemian Region; Near Karlštejn in Czech Republic
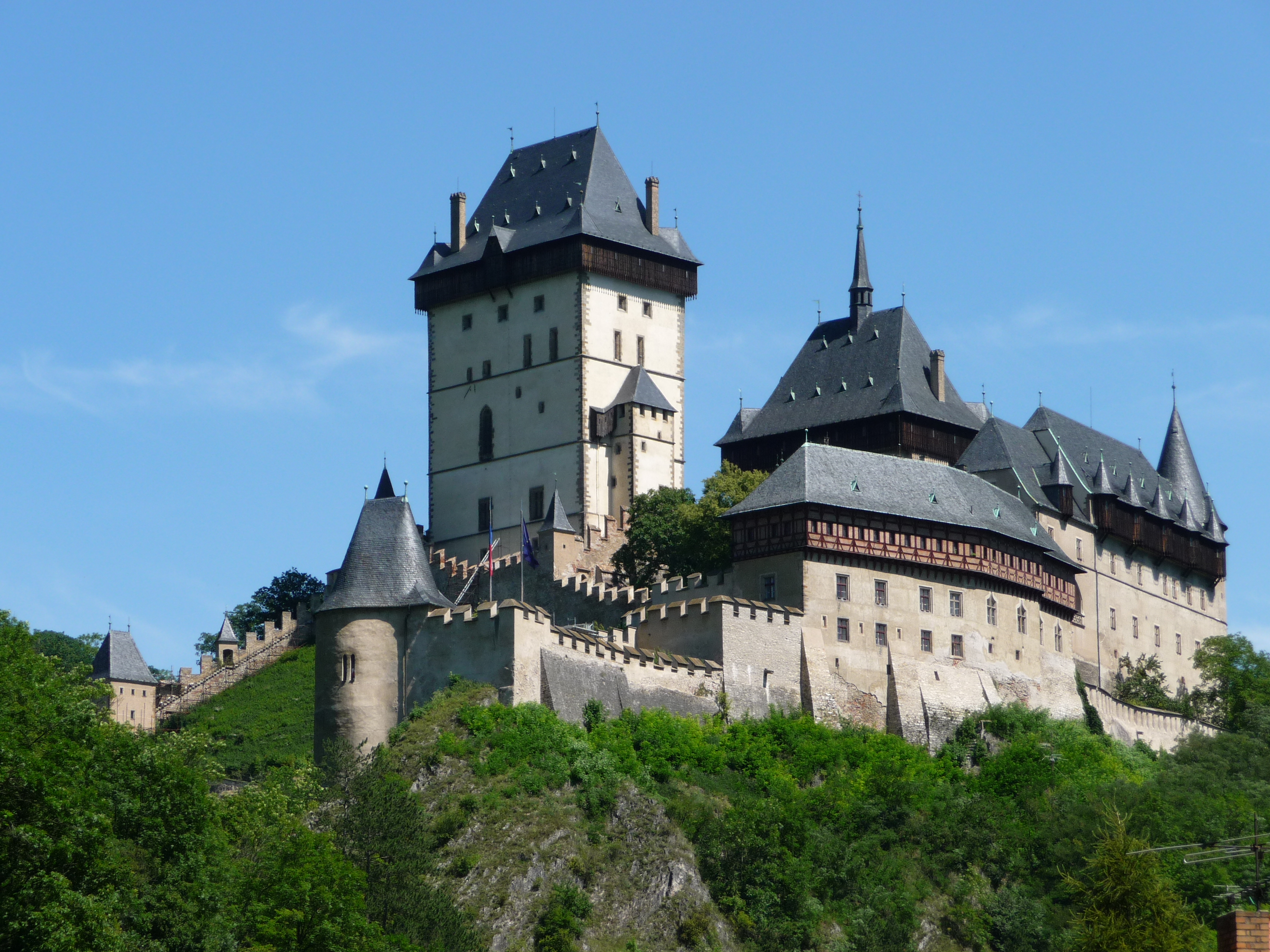
- Karlštejn Castle

Site information
- Type: Castle
- Operator: National Heritage Institute
- Open to the public: 1905
- Website: hrad-karlstejn.cz/en

Location
- Location in the Czech Republic
- Coordinates: 49°56′22″N 14°11′17″E

Site history
- Built: 1348

Karlštejn Castle (Czech: hrad Karlštejn; German: Burg Karlstein) is a large Gothic castle in Czechia, founded in 1348 by King Charles IV. It served as a place for safekeeping the Imperial Regalia as well as the Bohemian crown jewels, holy relics, and other royal treasures. Karlštejn is among the most famous and most frequently visited castles in the country.

== Location ==
Karlštejn Castle is located in the market town of Karlštejn, in the Central Bohemian Region. It is situated on a hill overlooking the Berounka river and the market town proper, roughly 30 km (19 mi) southwest of the capital city of Prague.

== Tourism ==
Karlštejn is one of the most popular castles in Czechia. As of 2019, it was the fifth most-visited castle, receiving more than 200,000 visitors.

== History ==
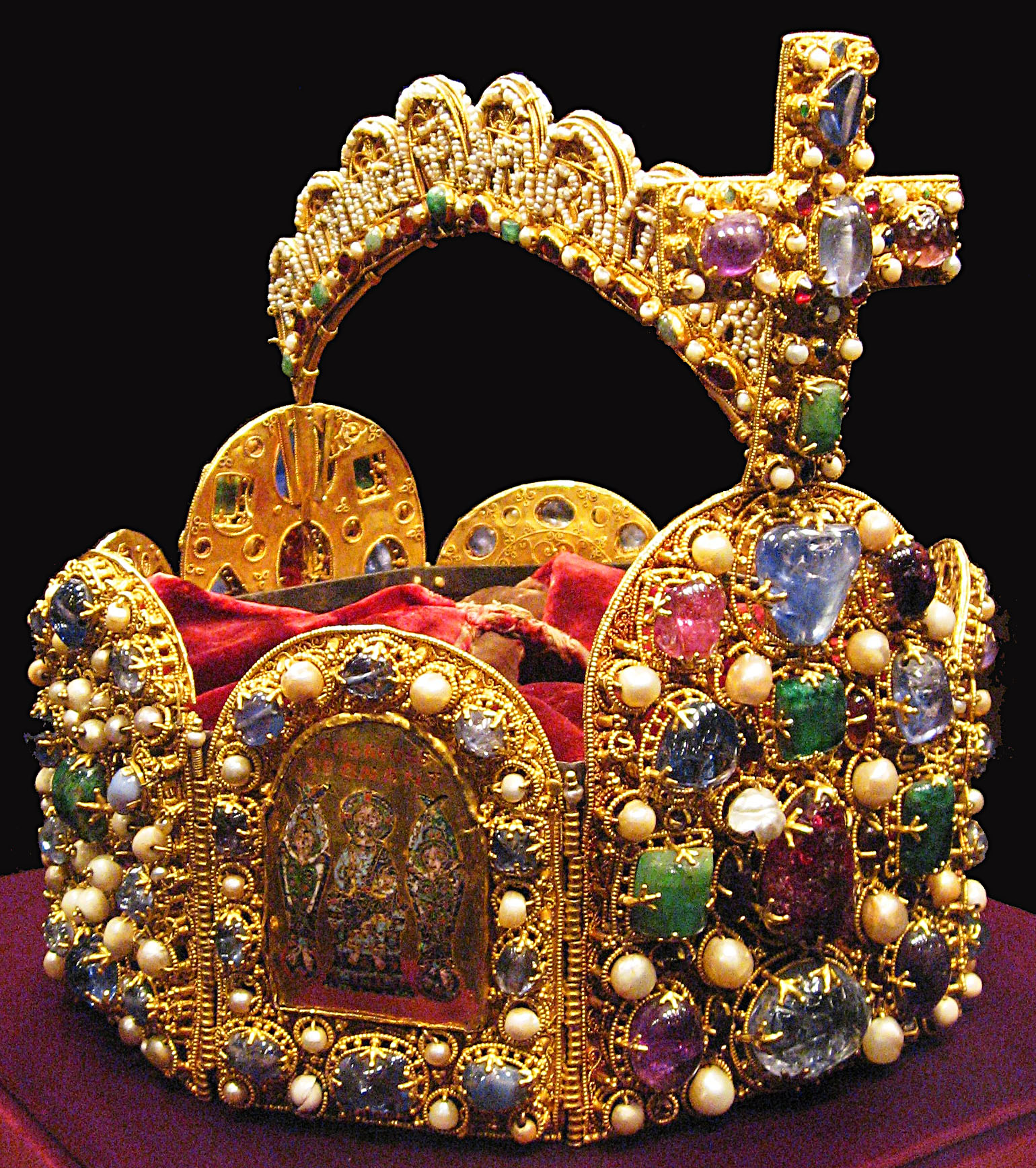
The Imperial Crown of the Holy Roman Empire was kept in the Castle until 1421.

Founded in 1348, the construction of Karlštejn Castle was directed by the later Karlštejn burgrave Vitus of Bítov, but there are no records of the builder himself. Some historians have speculated that Matthias of Arras may be credited with being the architect, but he died in 1352. Holy Roman Emperor Charles IV personally supervised the construction works and interior decoration. The project was finished nearly twenty years later, in 1365, when the "heart" of the treasury—the Chapel of the Holy Cross, situated in the great tower—was consecrated.

Following the outbreak of the Hussite Wars, the Imperial Regalia of the Holy Roman Empire were evacuated in 1421 and brought via Hungary to Nuremberg. In 1422, during the siege of the castle, Hussite attackers used biological warfare when Prince Sigismund Korybut employed catapults to throw dead (but not plague-infected) bodies and 2,000 carriage-loads of dung over the walls, apparently managing to spread infection among the defenders.

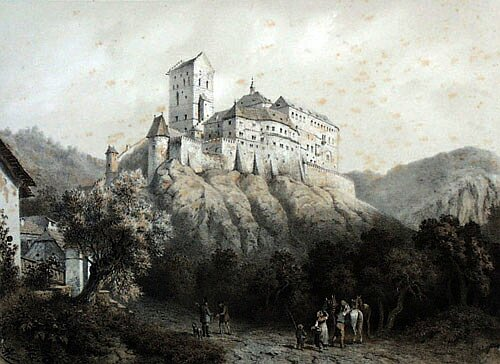
Karlštejn c. 1850

Later, the Bohemian crown jewels were moved back to the castle and kept there for almost two centuries. The castle underwent several reconstructions: in late Gothic style after 1480 and in Renaissance style in the last quarter of the 16th century. In 1487, the great tower was damaged by fire, and during the 16th century, there were several adaptations. During the Thirty Years' War in 1619, the coronation jewels and the archive were brought to Prague, and in 1620, the castle was turned over to Ferdinand II, Holy Roman Emperor. After having been conquered in 1648 by Swedes, it fell into disrepair. Finally, a Gothic Revival reconstruction was carried out by Josef Mocker between 1887 and 1899, giving the castle its present look.

In 1902, the castle and estate were bought by the industrialist Wilhelm von Medinger from the Austrian politician Ludwig von Oppenheimer, who had lived there previously.

The nearby village was founded during the construction of the castle and bore its name until it was renamed to Buda in the wake of the Hussite Wars. Renamed Budňany in the 18th century, it was merged with Poučník and called Karlštejn. There is a golf club named after the castle nearby.

== Architectural description ==
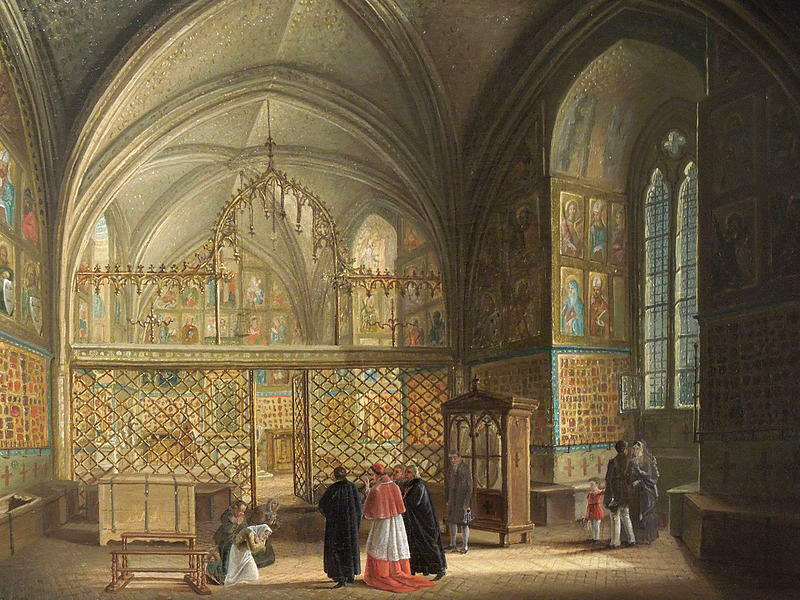
Chapel of the Holy Cross

The castle was built upon a promontory from the south side of Kněží Hora hill, divided from it by a narrow sag. The first gate, a square, two-story tower with a tall hip roof, stood above a moat at the western slope of the promontory. It was connected with the rampart traverse by means of a small portal. The traverse was protected by battlements and divided by a covered bastion in the middle. The second gate led to the burgrave's house courtyard. Drawbridges closed both entrances. The burgrave's house formed the Karlštejn settlement, and it was fortified with a 2 metres (6.6 ft)-wide rampart, with the well tower standing slightly lower..

The core of the castle consisted of three parts placed on terraces. On the lowest terrace, there stood the imperial palace; above it, there was the Marian tower, and the great tower stood the highest. The palace is about 12.5 metres (41 ft) wide and 46 metres (151 ft) long, enclosed in the east by a semi-cylindrical tower. The ground space is open to the courtyard, and the rest was occupied by a granary. Three rooms form the first floor, with the largest being the central room—the so-called knight's hall. The emperor inhabited the second floor of the palace. A spiral staircase connected it with the third floor, in which resided the empress with her female retinue.

The central area of the 60-metre (200 ft) high and separately fortified great tower, with walls 4 to 7.5 metres (13 to 25 ft) thick, is the Chapel of the Holy Cross, which housed valuable state documents along with the symbols of state power—the Imperial Regalia, later the Bohemian Crown Jewels.

The well tower was the first part of the castle to be built. An underground channel was excavated to bring in water from a nearby stream, yielding a water column of 25 metres (82 ft), sufficient to last for several months. The reservoir had to be manually refilled roughly twice a year by opening a floodgate.

== Gallery ==
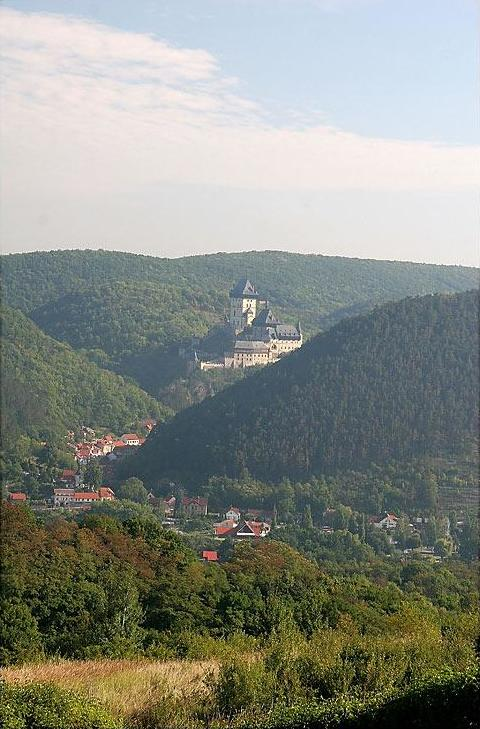
Karlštejn Castle and the market town

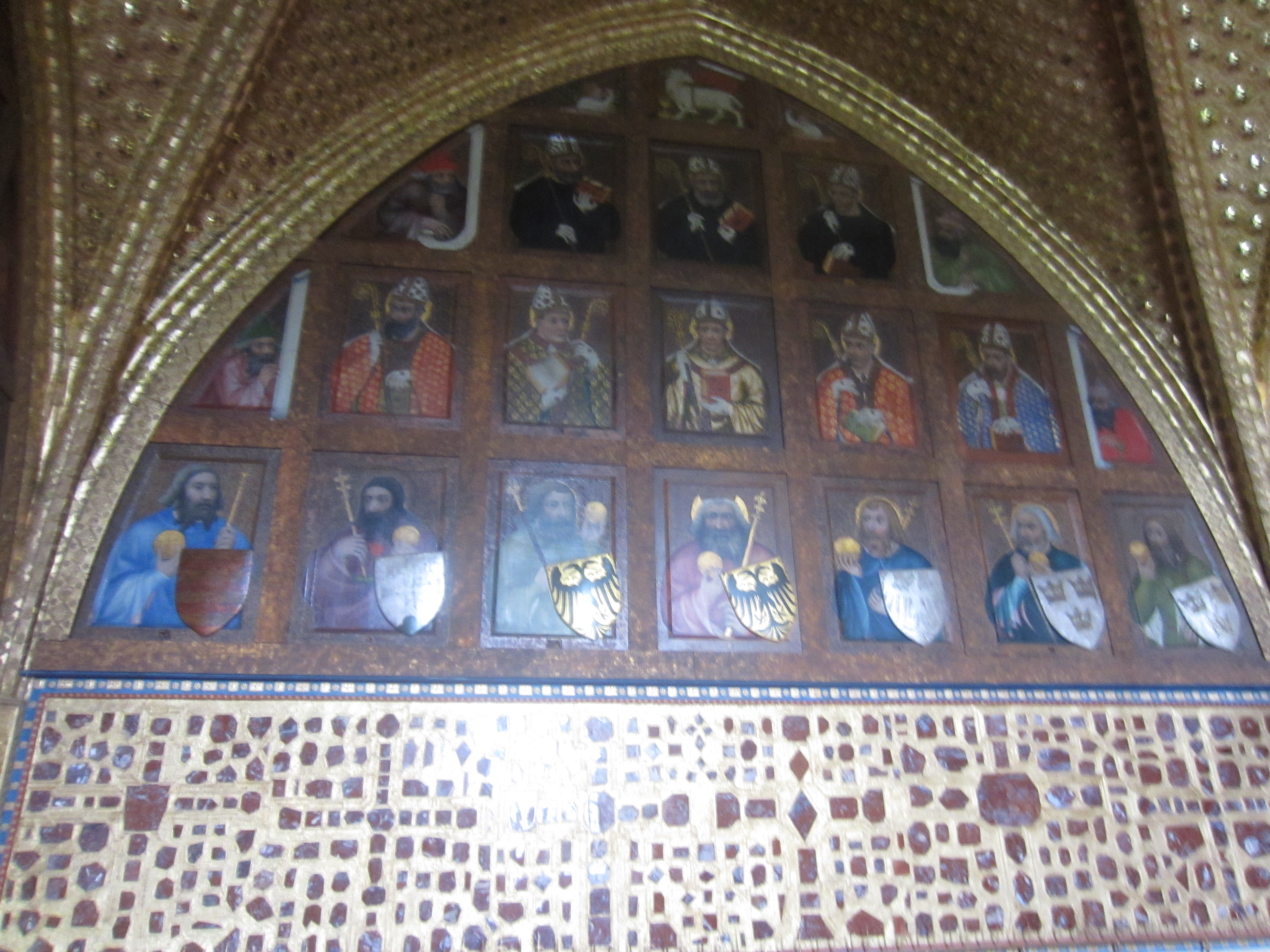
A wall in the Chapel of the Holy Cross

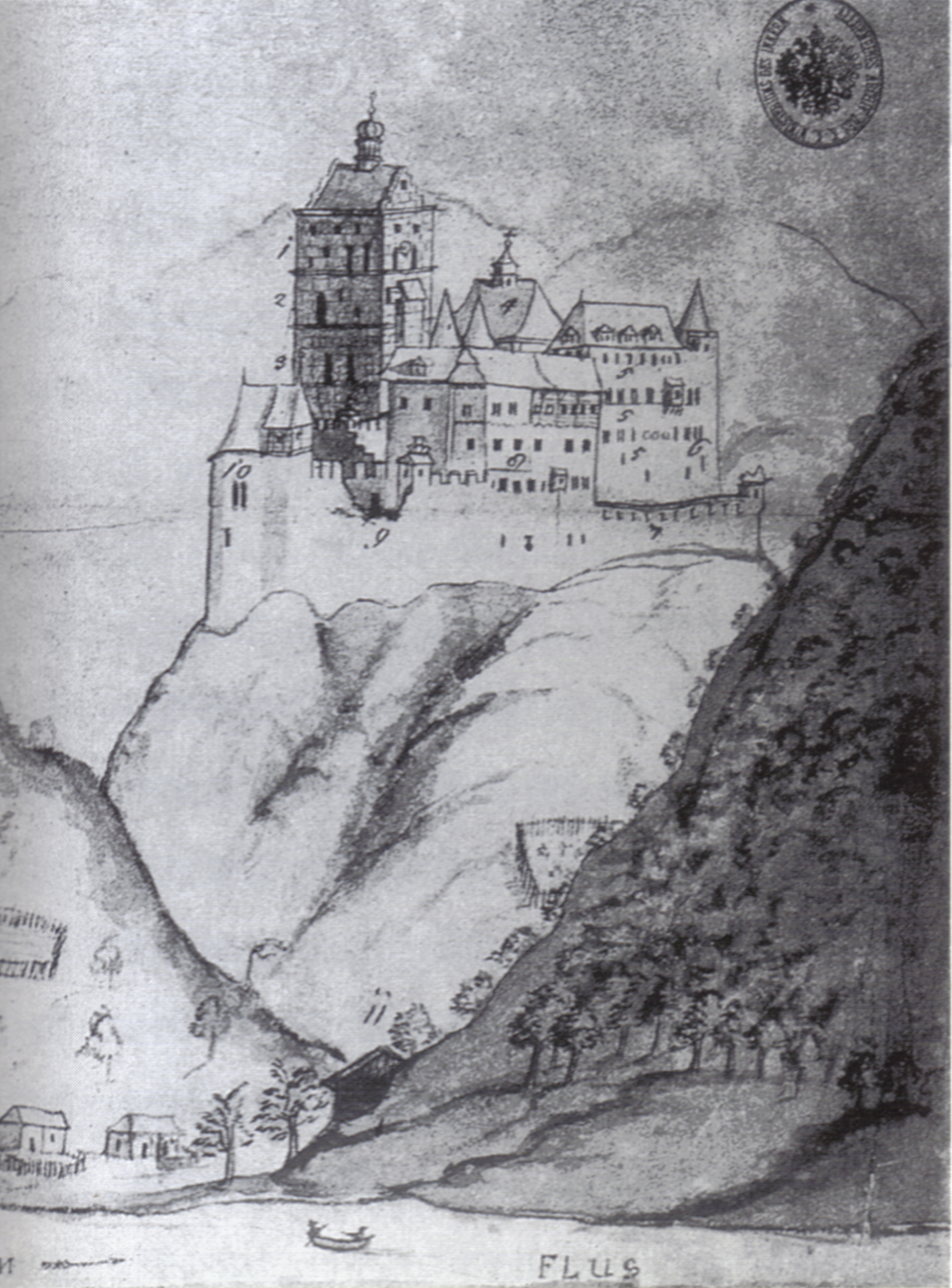
Oldest depiction, from 1720

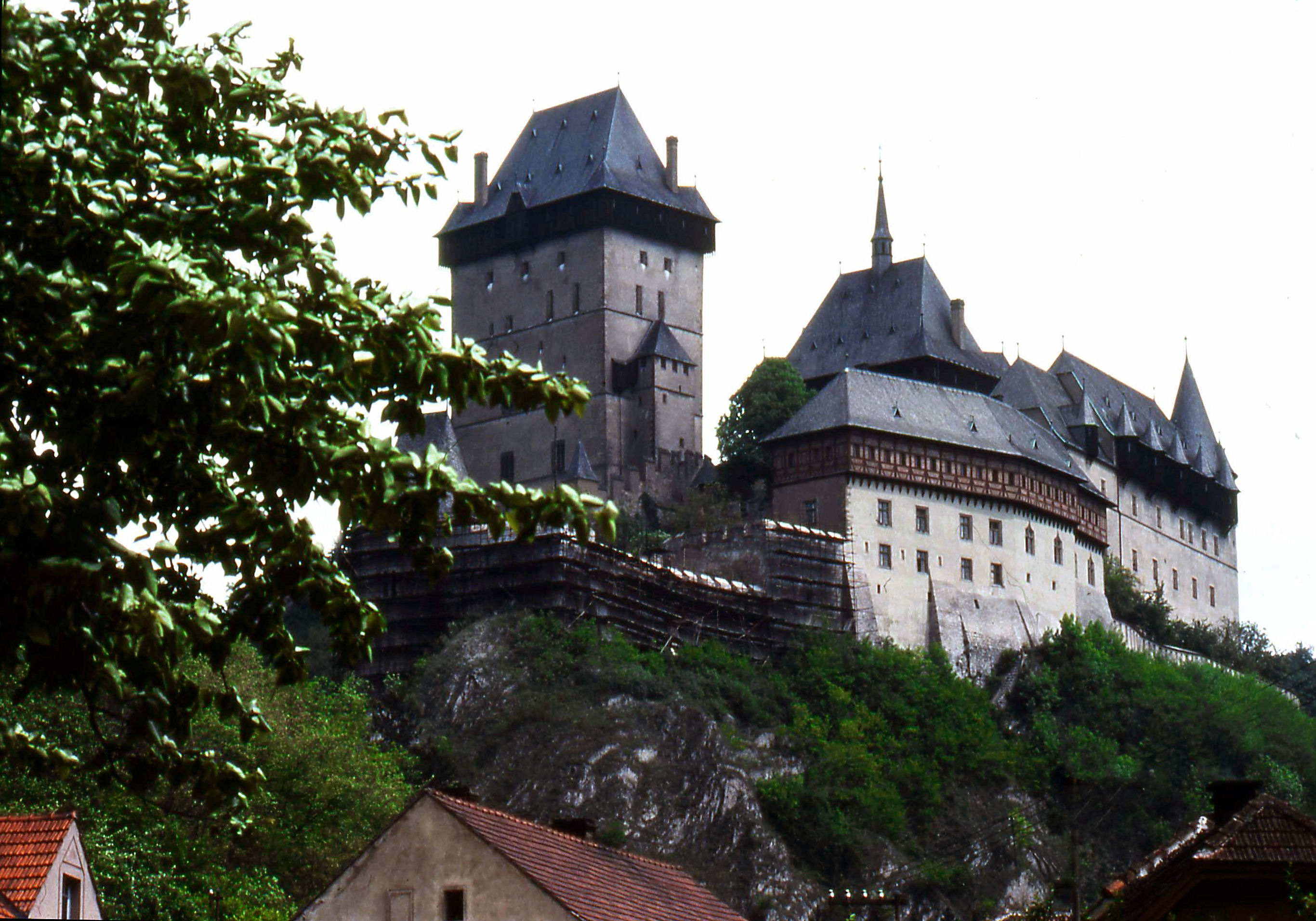
Karlštejn in 1976

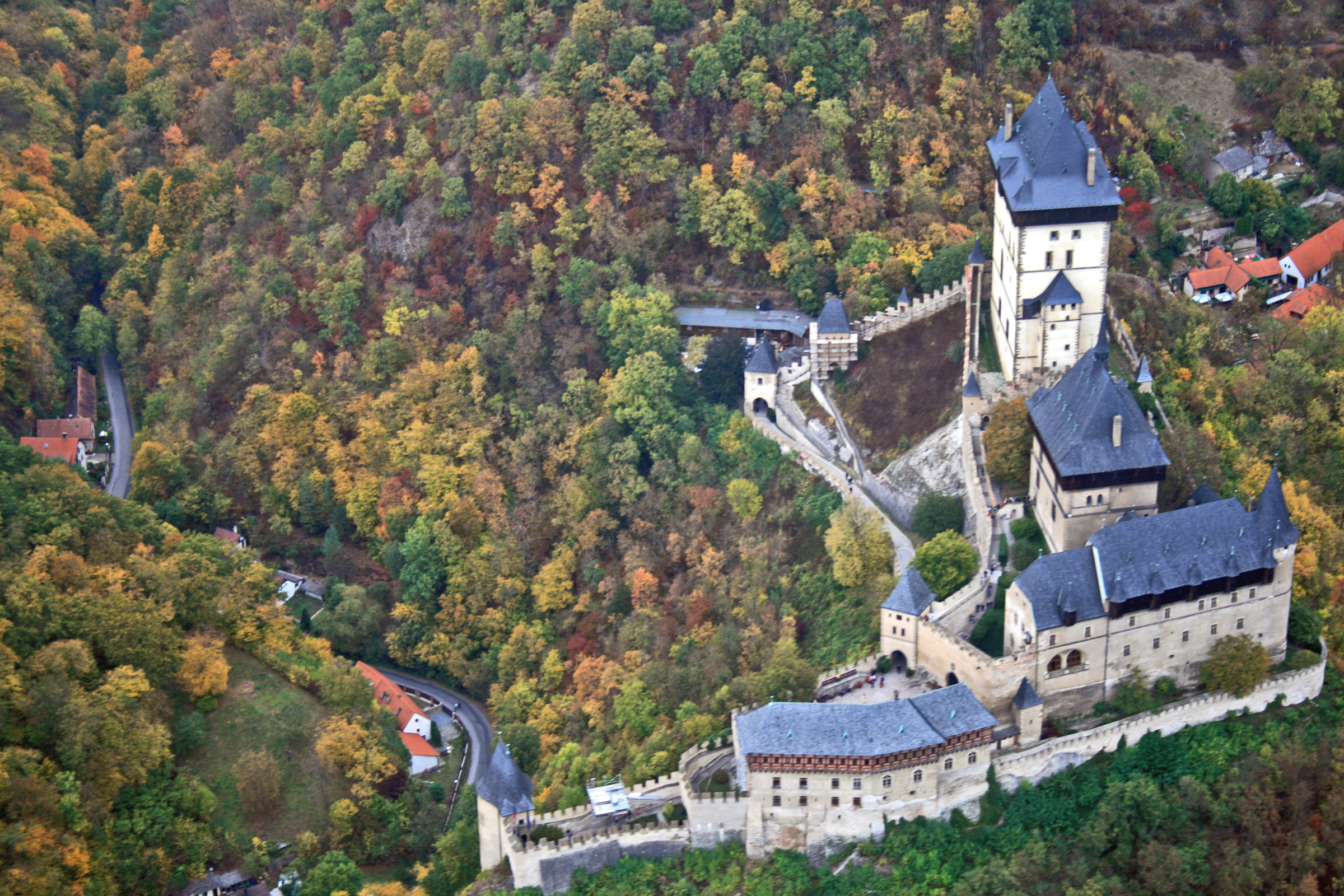
Aerial view

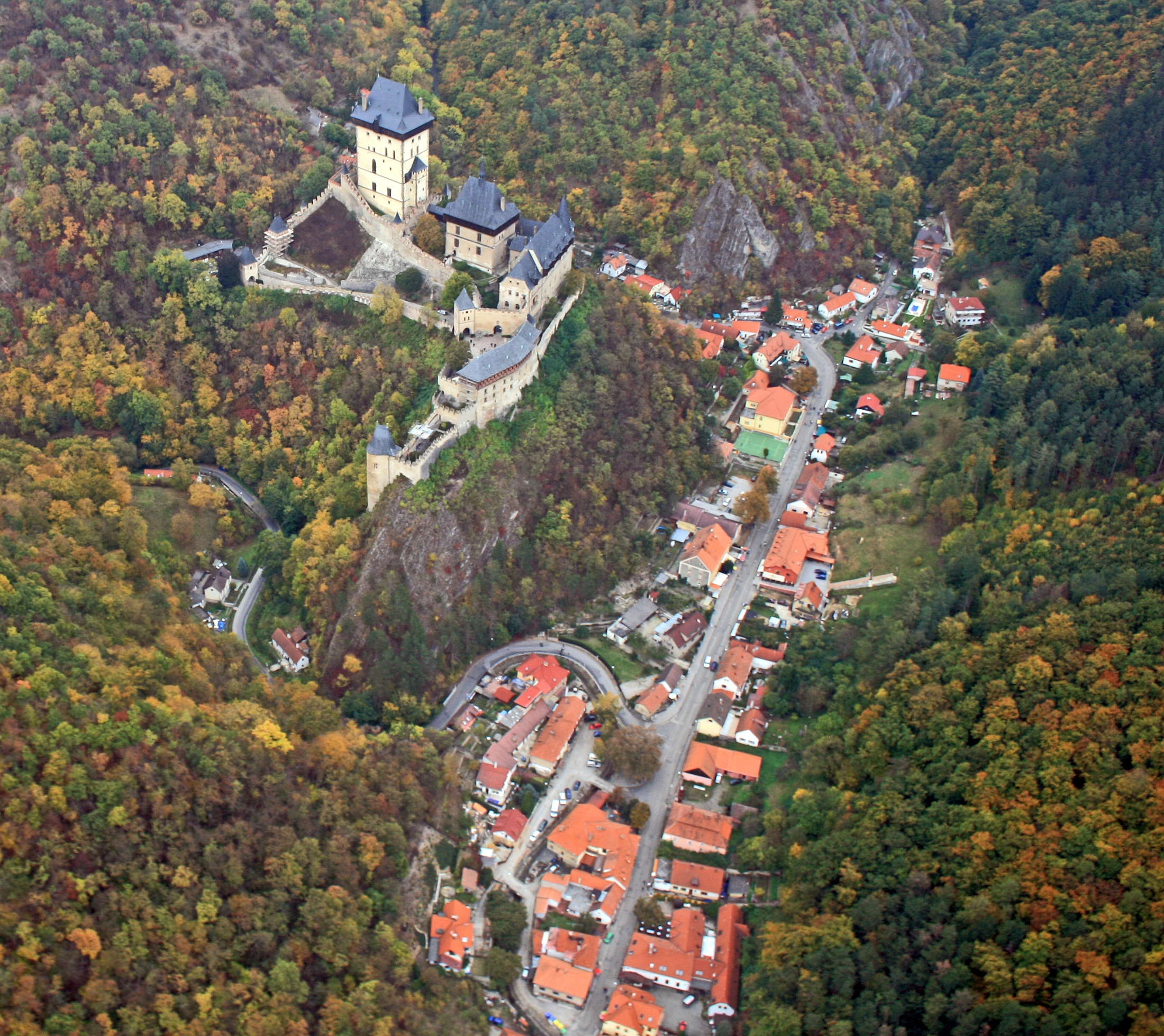
Aerial view of Karlštejn town and castle

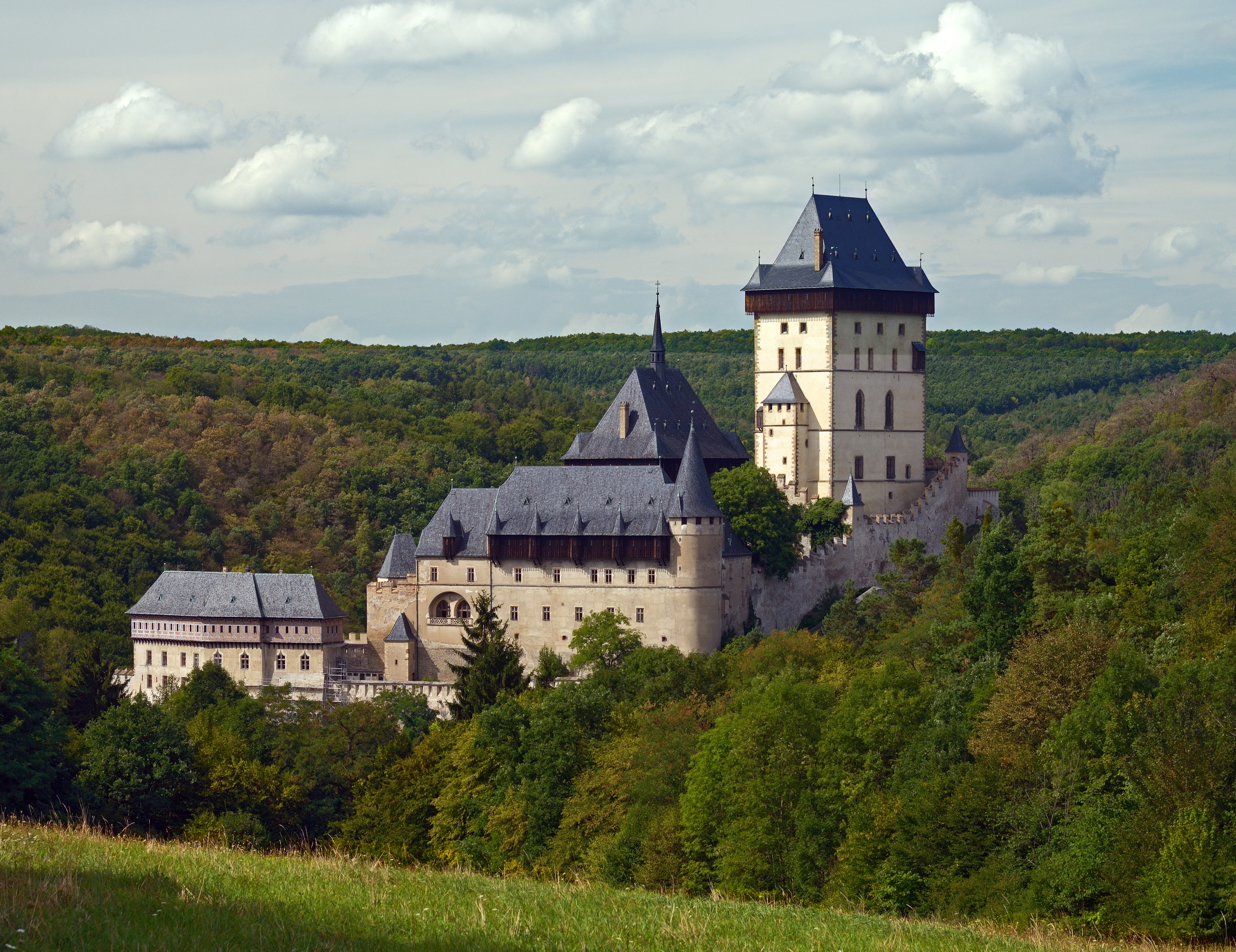
View from the hill

== See also ==
- List of castles in the Czech Republic
- Czech Gothic architecture
