= Saint Matthew the Evangelist (Master Theodoric) =

Painting by Master Theodoric

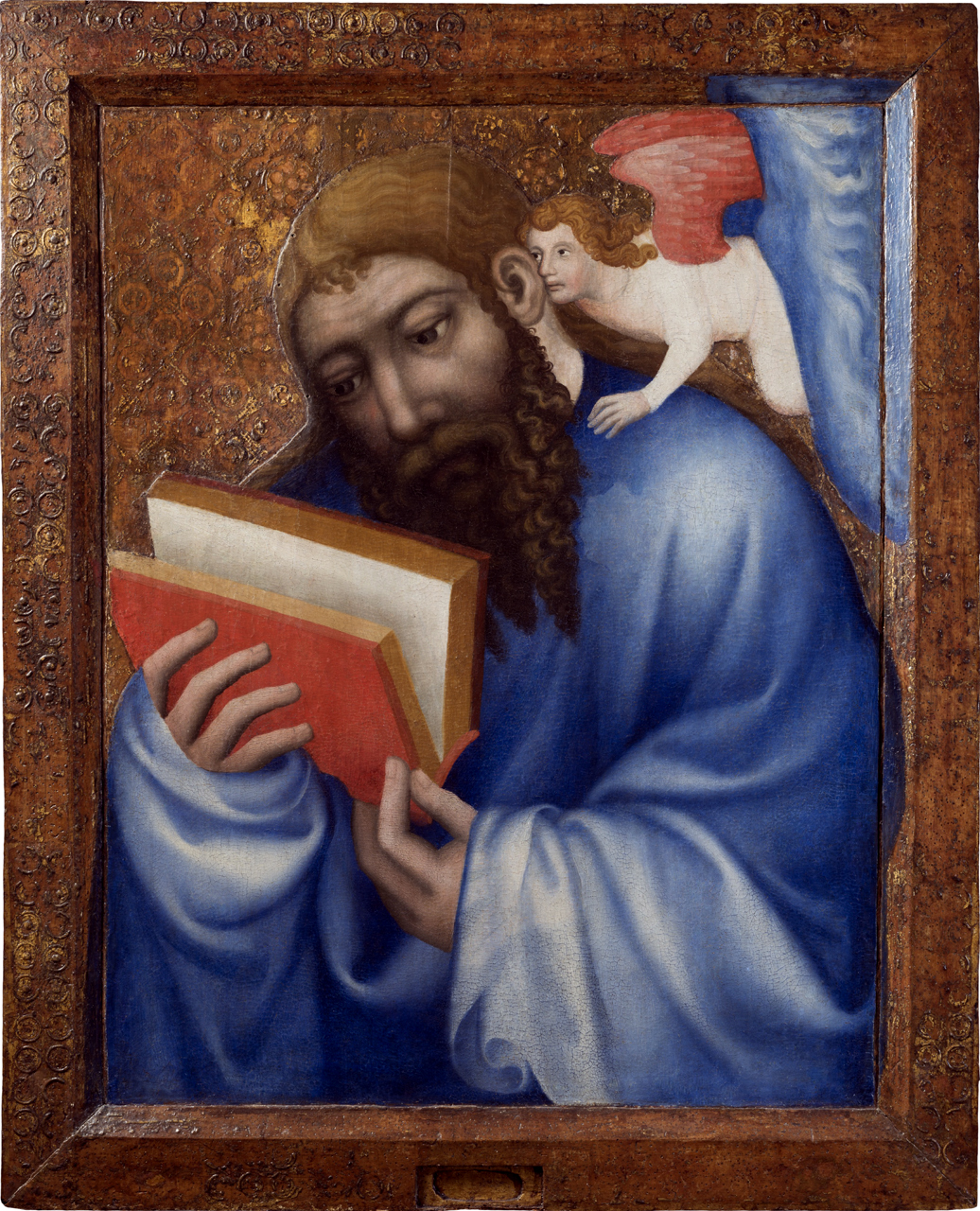
- Saint Matthew the Evangelist (Master Theodoric)
- Artist: Master Theodoric
- Year: 1359/1360 - 1365
- Medium: oil tempera on beech board
- Dimensions: 114,8 cm × 92,8 cm (452 in × 365 in)
- Location: National Gallery, Prague

Saint Matthew the Evangelist is an oil tempera on beech board painting by Bohemian painter Master Theodoric. It forms an almost symmetrical counterpart to the image of Saint Luke on the altar wall in the Chapel of the Holy Cross. It is an exceptionally high quality painting by Master Theodoric. The painting is exhibited in the collection of medieval art of the National Gallery in Prague.

== Description and classification ==
An oval reliquary hole is preserved in the lower part of the frame. The ornamental decoration of the background and frame with pastiglia is well preserved in the left and upper part, elsewhere it is considerably damaged.

The colours and almost mirror-like composition are reminiscent of Theodoric's painting of St Luke. In the facial part, detailed with fine brushstrokes, the painting follows the underdrawing. The incarnation is rendered in warmer tones, the hair is brown and the beard is not greyed out. The half-figure of the angel, emerging from a blue cloud and communicating the words of the Gospel to Matthew, is in contrasting colours of white, red and gold, as is the book in Matthew's hands.

As can be seen from the images taken by infrared reflectography, the most significant changes in composition during the painting occurred in the case of the book, which is only ajar, and also in the subsequent position of the hands. The treatment of the drapery therefore had to be modified. While in the right hand of St. Matthew the system of folds is almost identical with that of St. Luke, in the left hand the drapery is thrown over the bent forearm and merges in a tubular fold. The change is due to the position of the left hand, which is in the opposite position to St Luke's, and the thumb and forefinger join to hold the cross. The cross has not survived, nor have other gilded ornaments on Theodoric's paintings. The fingers are modelled with greyish shading, but the details are less elaborate than in St Luke.

The change in composition was necessitated by the need to individualize each of the 130 figures depicted in the Chapel of the Holy Cross. Theodoric's prefigurement may have been the cycle of murals with portraits of rulers and their imaginary ancestors back to the forefather Noah, with which the so-called Master of the Luxembourg Family Tree had decorated the walls of the imperial palace. Their portraits have not survived in their original place, but are documented in written reports and book illuminations of the so-called Heidelberg Codex. The very typology of broad and softly modelled faces with rich beards, which is characteristic of Theodoric, is probably also mediated by the Master of the Luxembourg Family Tree, who came to Bohemia shortly after 1355 from France. It also occurs in French book painting in the second half of the 1350s by the Maître de la Bible de Jean de Sy.

As stated by Pešina, all the paintings by Master Theodoric in the Chapel of the Holy Cross at Karlštejn must have been completed before its second consecration. This also determines the time span of the paintings' creation from the turn of 1359/1360, when the decoration of the chapel with a mural was still being considered, as confirmed by the sketches that have survived in several places of the plasterwork, until the chapel's consecration in 1365.

Pavel Štecha's photograph of Václav Havel listening to Theodoric's St. Matthew has become very famous.

=== St. Matthew in the works of painters ===
St. Matthew was a tax collector and served as a missionary in Judea, Persia and Ethiopia. He is often depicted with an angel writing the Gospel as he is called to the apostolate, sometimes directly standing up before Jesus or the apostles Peter and Andrew from the money table. Matthew's Gospel is considered the most descriptive. It contains many interesting details and thus serves as a frequent source for works of art with Christian themes.

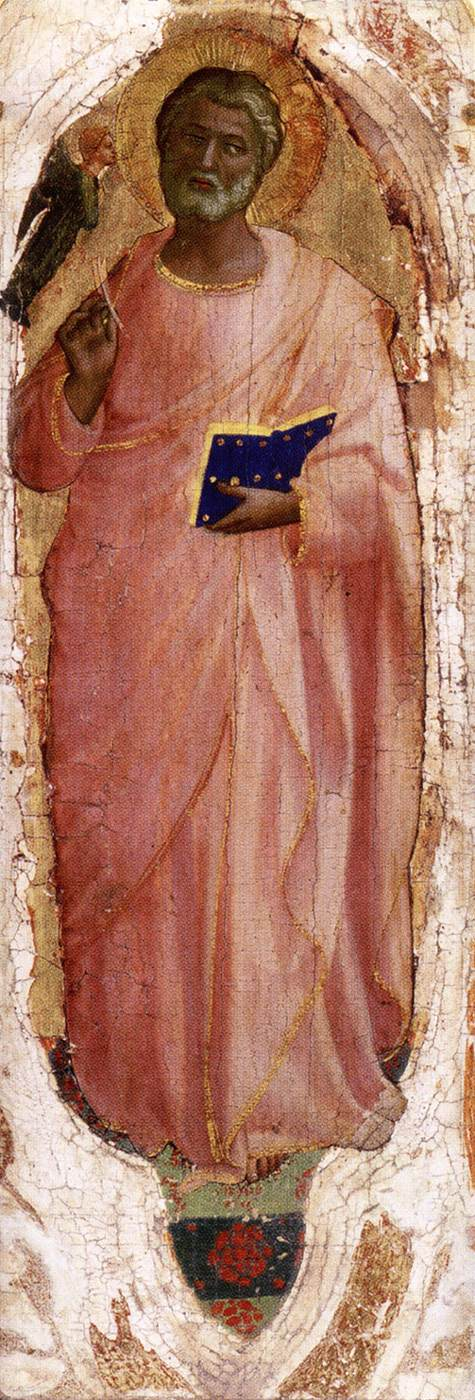
St Matthew, Fra Angelico (1424)

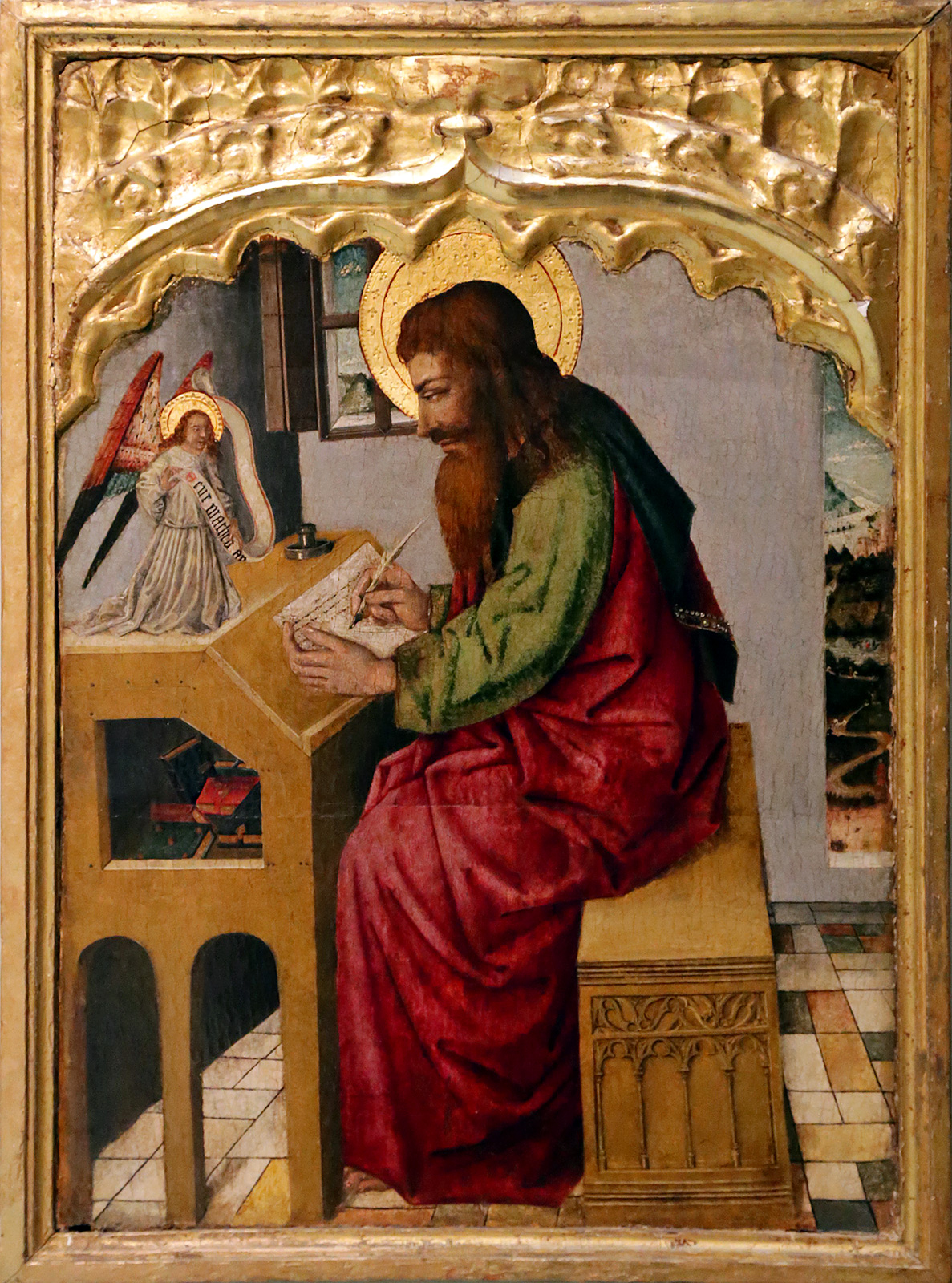
St. Matthew, Juan Rexach (15th century)

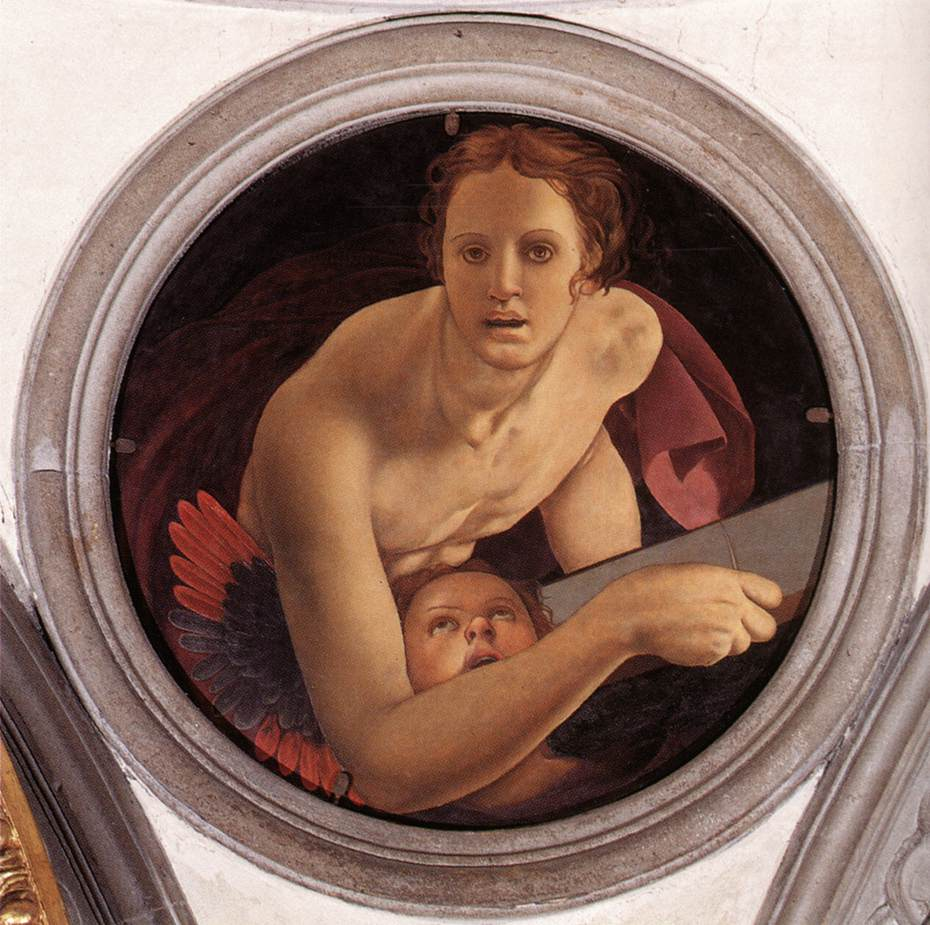
St Matthew, Angelo Bronzino (1525)

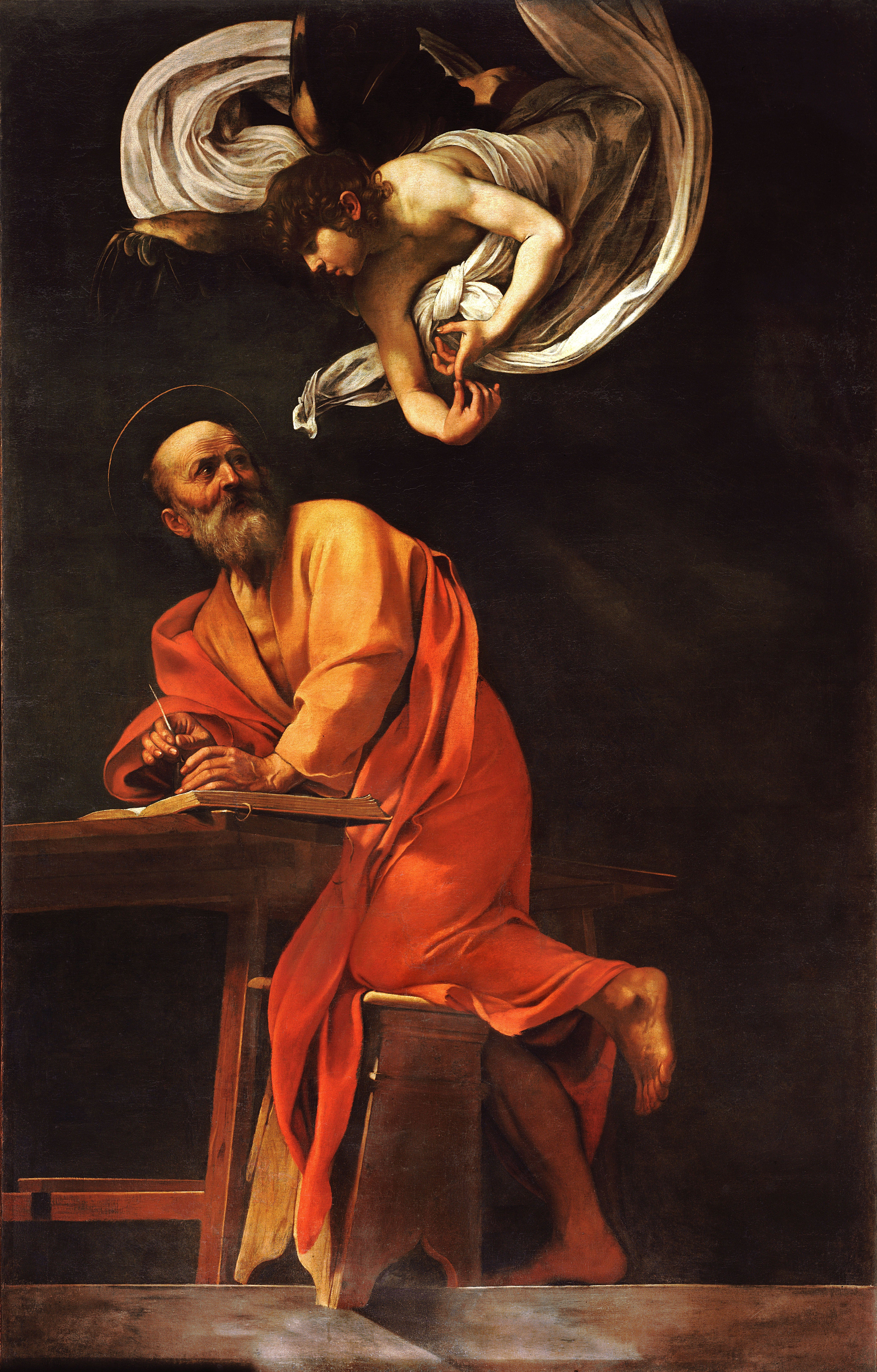
St. Matthew, Caravaggio (ca. 1600)

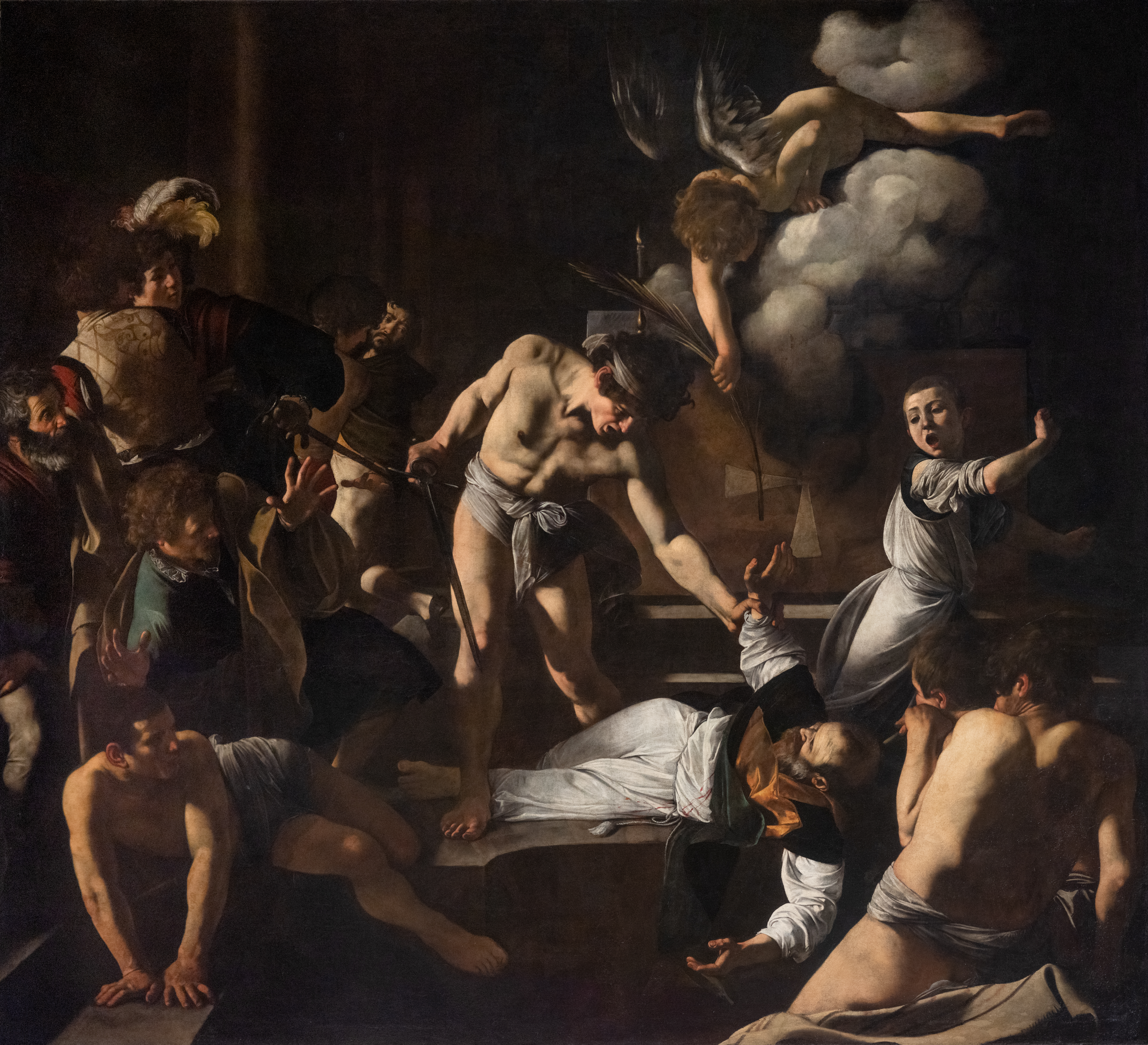
Martyrdom of St. Matthew, Caravaggio (1600)

== Sources ==
- Jiří Fajt (ed.), Magister Theodoricus, court painter to Emperor Charles IV, National Gallery in Prague 1997, ISBN 80-7035-142-X
- Pešina Jaroslav, Panel Painting. Czech Gothic Art 1350–1420, Academia Prague 1970
- Dvořáková, Vlasta, Menclová Dobroslava, Karlštejn, State Publishing House of Beautiful Literature and Art, Prague 1965
- Friedl Antonín, Mikuláš Wurmser, Master of Royal Portraits at Karlštejn, SNKLU Prague 1956
