= Altar frontal from Avià =

12th or 13th century Romanesque painting

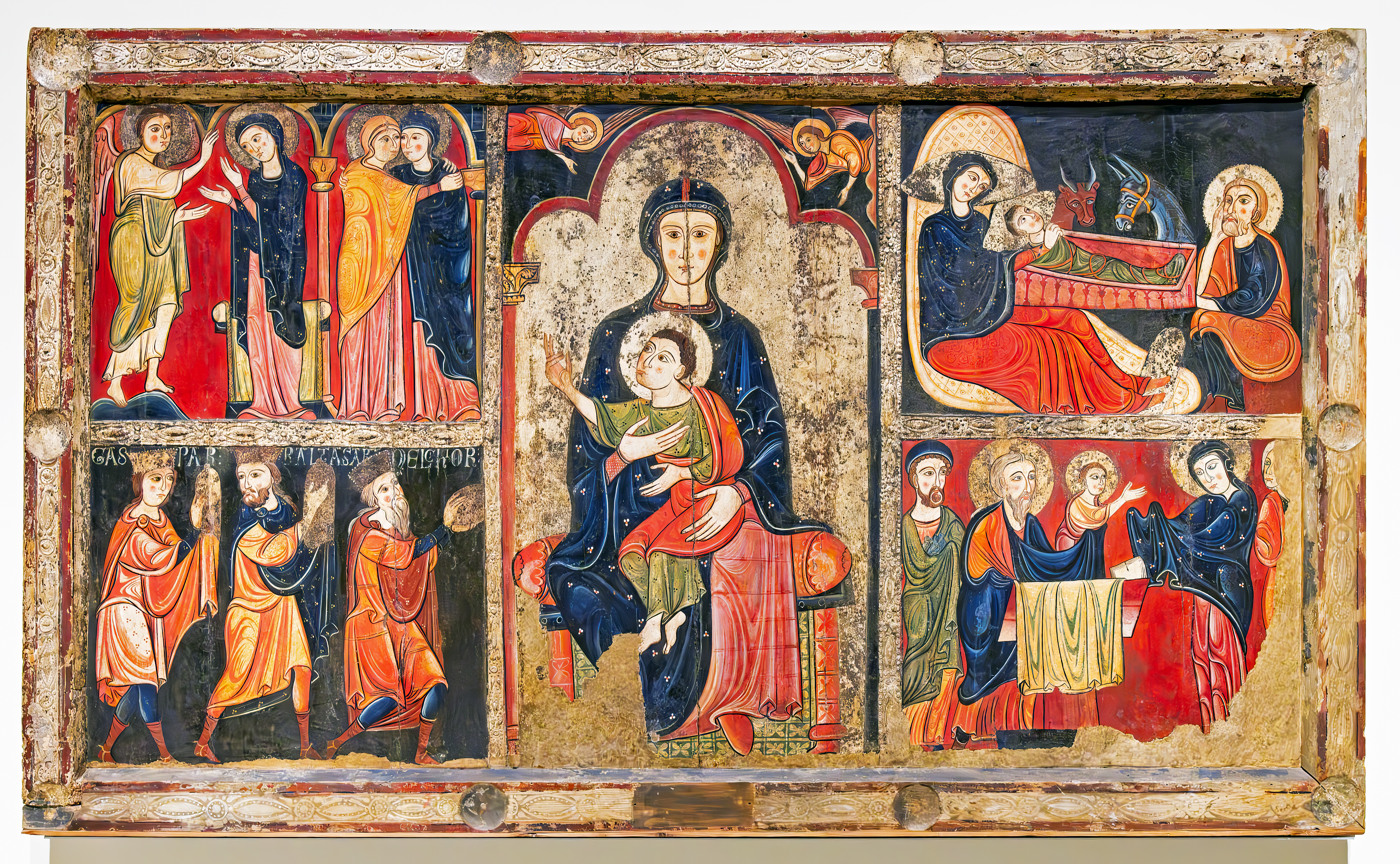
- Artist: Unknown
- Year: 13th century
- Medium: Tempera on wood
- Dimensions: 107 cm × 177 cm (42 in × 70 in)
- Location: Museu Nacional d'Art de Catalunya, Barcelona

The Altar frontal from Avià is a rare Romanesque altar frontal exhibited at the National Art Museum of Catalonia in Barcelona. It is the front of the altar of the church of St. Mary of Avià, in the county of Berguedà, later moved to MNAC Barcelona, while the church has a replica in place. It is dated to the 13th century or earlier, and was painted by an unknown artist.

The frontal is painted in tempera on a wood panel, with parchment overlaps, pastiglia stucco relief decoration and remains of additional vanished metal plates. It is divided into five areas, dominated by the central Virgin and Child. The figures are elongated, with Byzantine-style costumes and frontal poses. Four scenes surround the central figures: the Annunciation and Visitation, Nativity, the Epiphany and the Presentation of Jesus in the temple. Both the frame and the divisions between the compartments are decorated with gilded gypsum plaster, imitating precious metal.
