= List of tourist attractions in the City of Westminster =

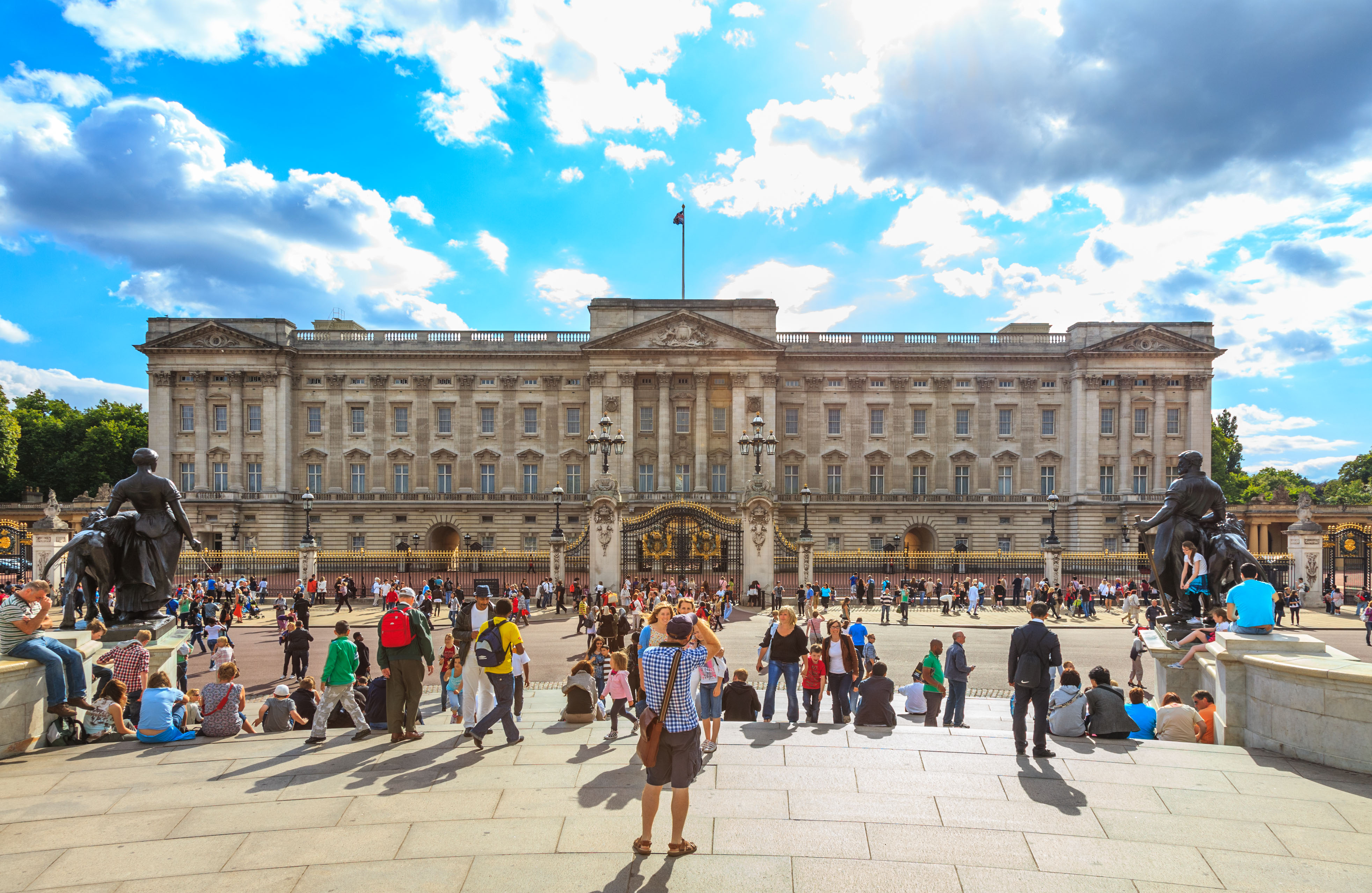
Tourists at Buckingham Palace

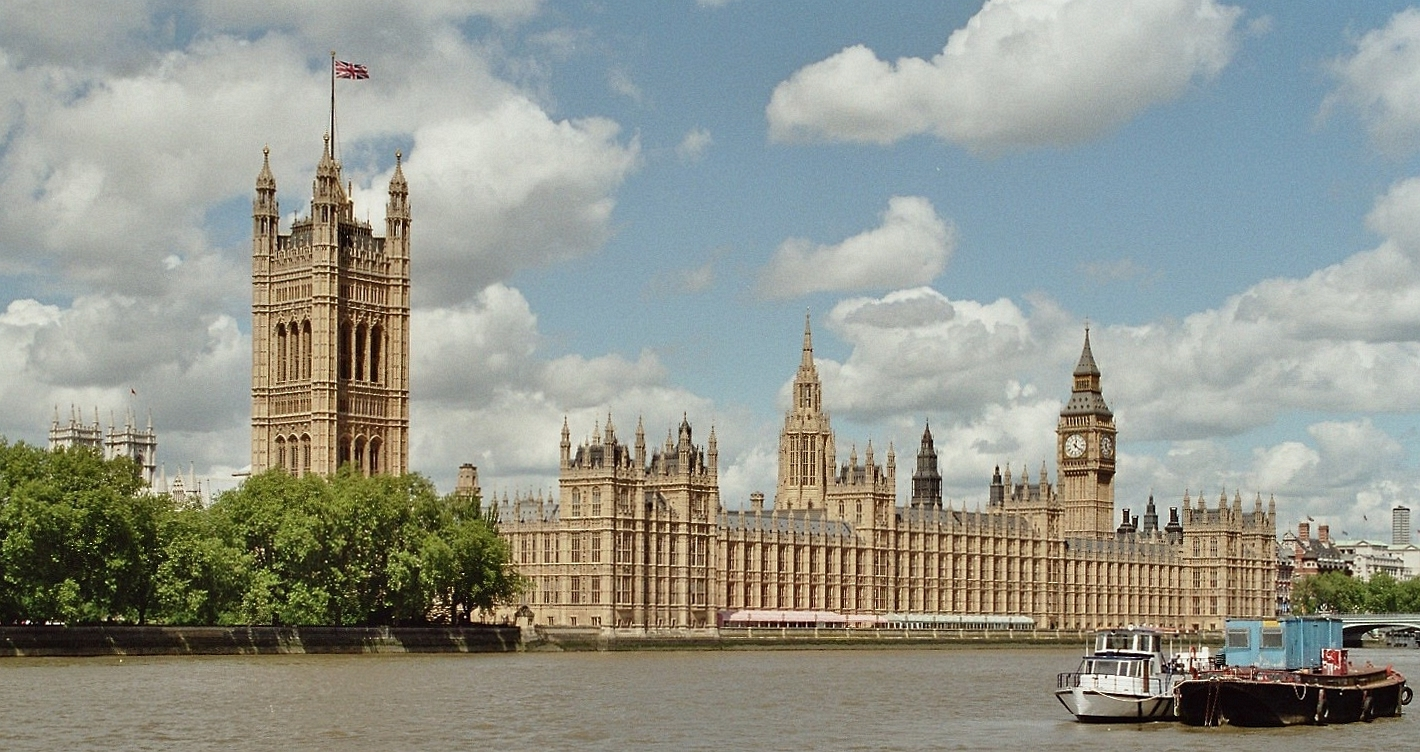
Palace of Westminster

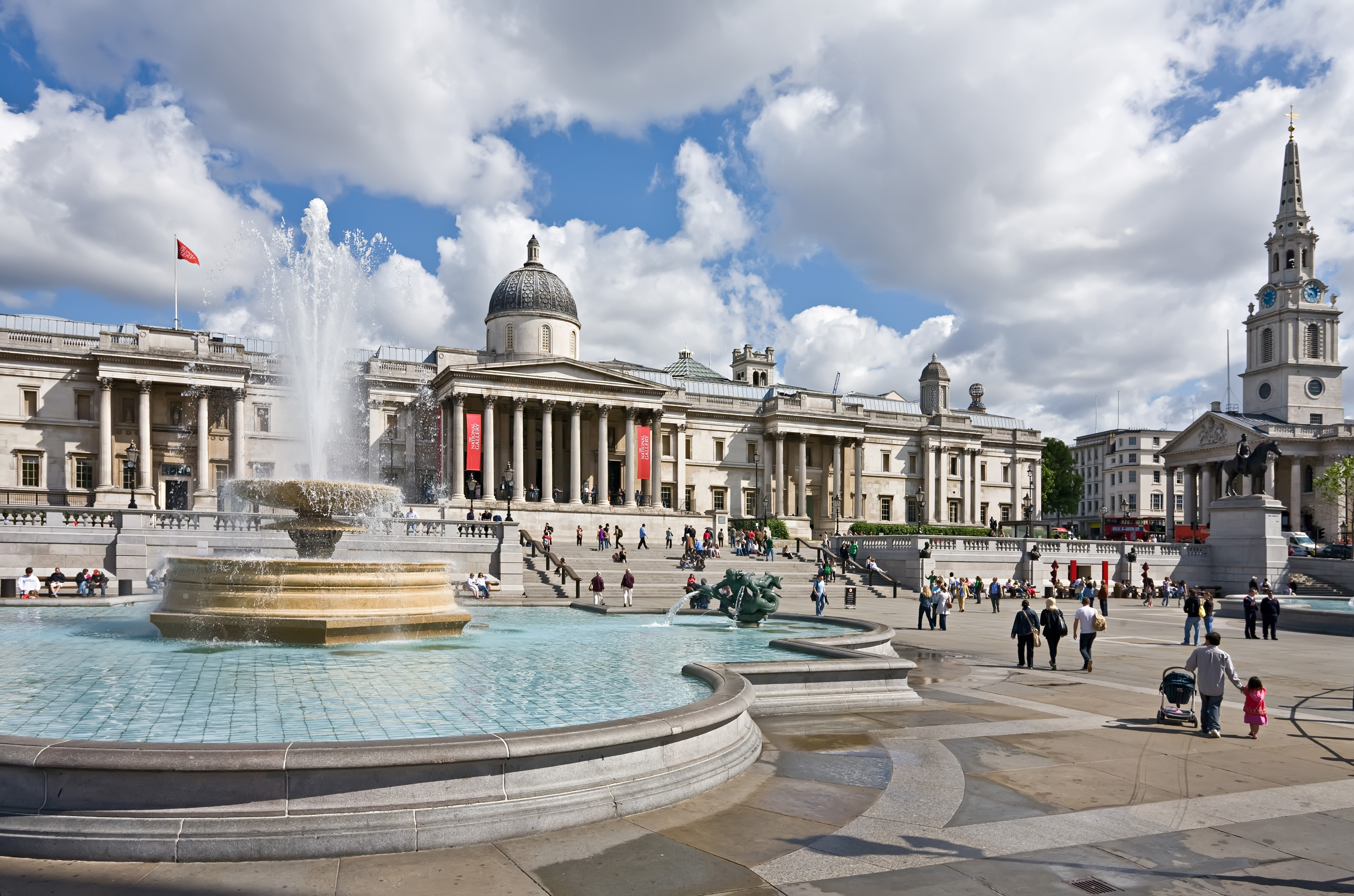
Trafalgar Square

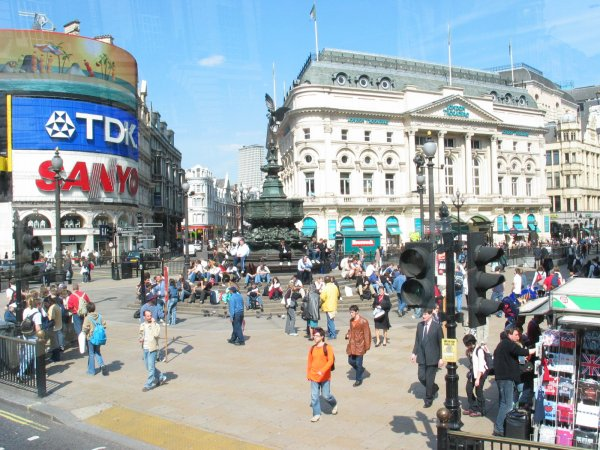
Piccadilly Circus

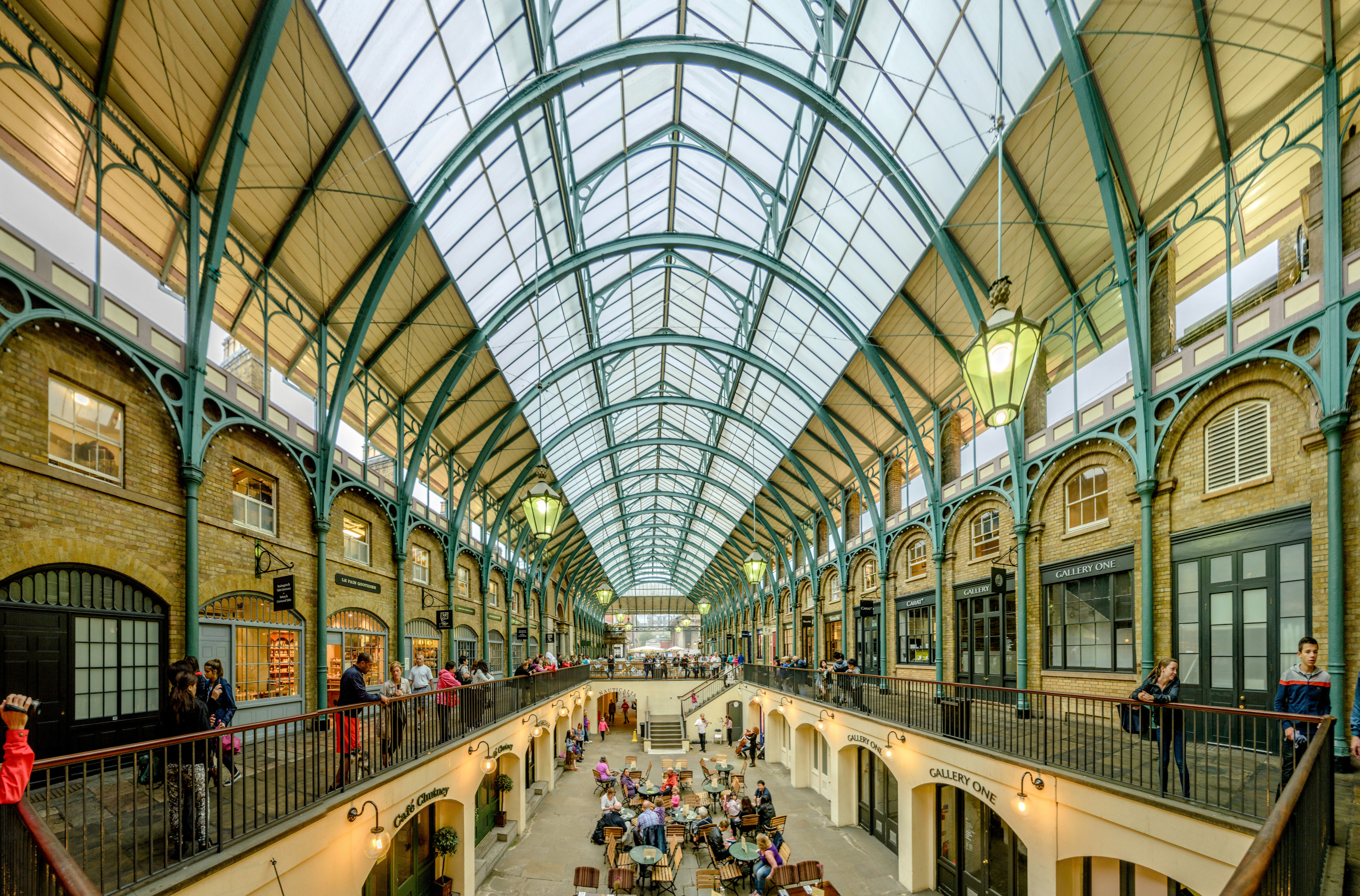
Covent Garden Market

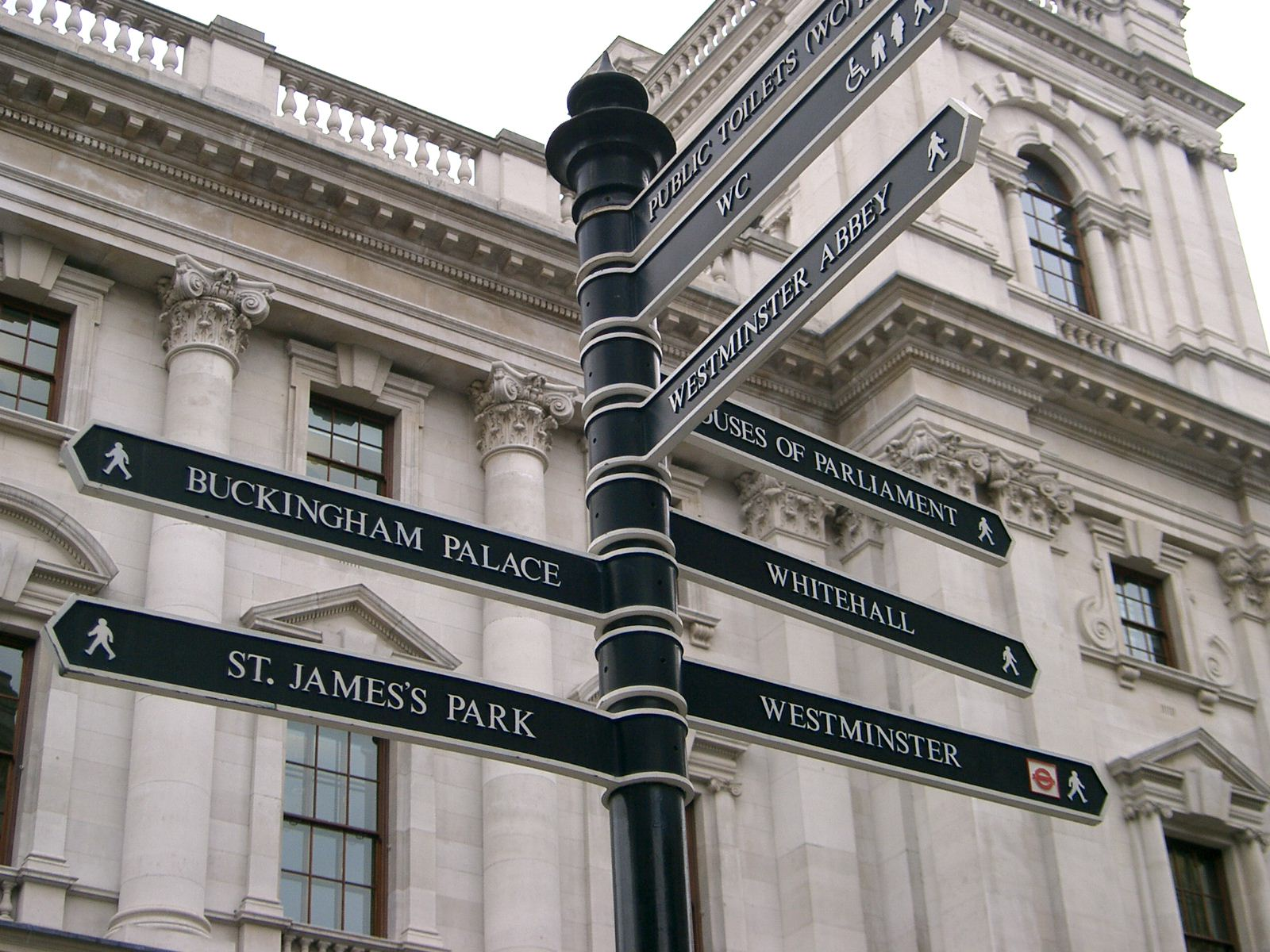
A signpost on Parliament Square with directions for nearby attractions

The City of Westminster contains many of the most famous tourist sites in London.

== Covent Garden ==
- London Transport Museum
- Royal Opera House

== Hyde Park ==
- Serpentine Galleries
- Speakers' Corner
- Hyde Park Corner
  - Apsley House
  - Wellington Arch

== Marylebone ==
- Madame Tussauds
- Oxford Street
  - Selfridges
- Sherlock Holmes Museum
- Wallace Collection
- All Souls Church, Langham Place

== Mayfair ==
- Handel & Hendrix in London
- Royal Academy of Arts
- Burlington Arcade
- Royal Institution

== Millbank ==
- Tate Britain

== Regent’s Park ==
- London Zoo

== St James’s ==
- Buckingham Palace, official London residence of the king
  - Queen's Gallery
  - Royal Mews
- Fortnum & Mason
- St James's Palace

== St John’s Wood ==
- Abbey Road Studios
- Lord's Cricket Ground

== Soho ==
- Benjamin Franklin House, a museum made from the Founding Father's last-standing residence
- Carnaby Street
- Leicester Square
- Piccadilly Circus
- London Pavilion
- Regent Street
  - Hamleys
  - Liberty's
- Trafalgar Square
  - National Gallery
  - National Portrait Gallery
  - Nelson's Column
  - St Martin-in-the-Fields

== South Kensington ==
- Albert Memorial
- Royal Albert Hall

== Strand ==
- Royal Courts of Justice
- Savoy Hotel
- Somerset House
  - Courtauld Gallery
- St Mary le Strand
- St Clement Danes

== Victoria ==
- Westminster Cathedral

== Victoria Embankment ==
- Cleopatra's Needle

== Westminster ==
- Palace of Westminster (Houses of Parliament)
  - Big Ben
  - Jewel Tower
- Westminster Abbey
  - Westminster Abbey Museum
- St Margaret's, Westminster
- Methodist Central Hall Westminster

== Whitehall ==
- Banqueting House
- Churchill War Rooms
- The Cenotaph
- Clarence House
- Downing Street
- Horse Guards Parade
  - The Guards Museum
