= Portrait of a Man with a Medal of Cosimo the Elder =

Painting by Sandro Botticelli

Portrait of a Man with the Medal of Cosimo de' Medici the Elder
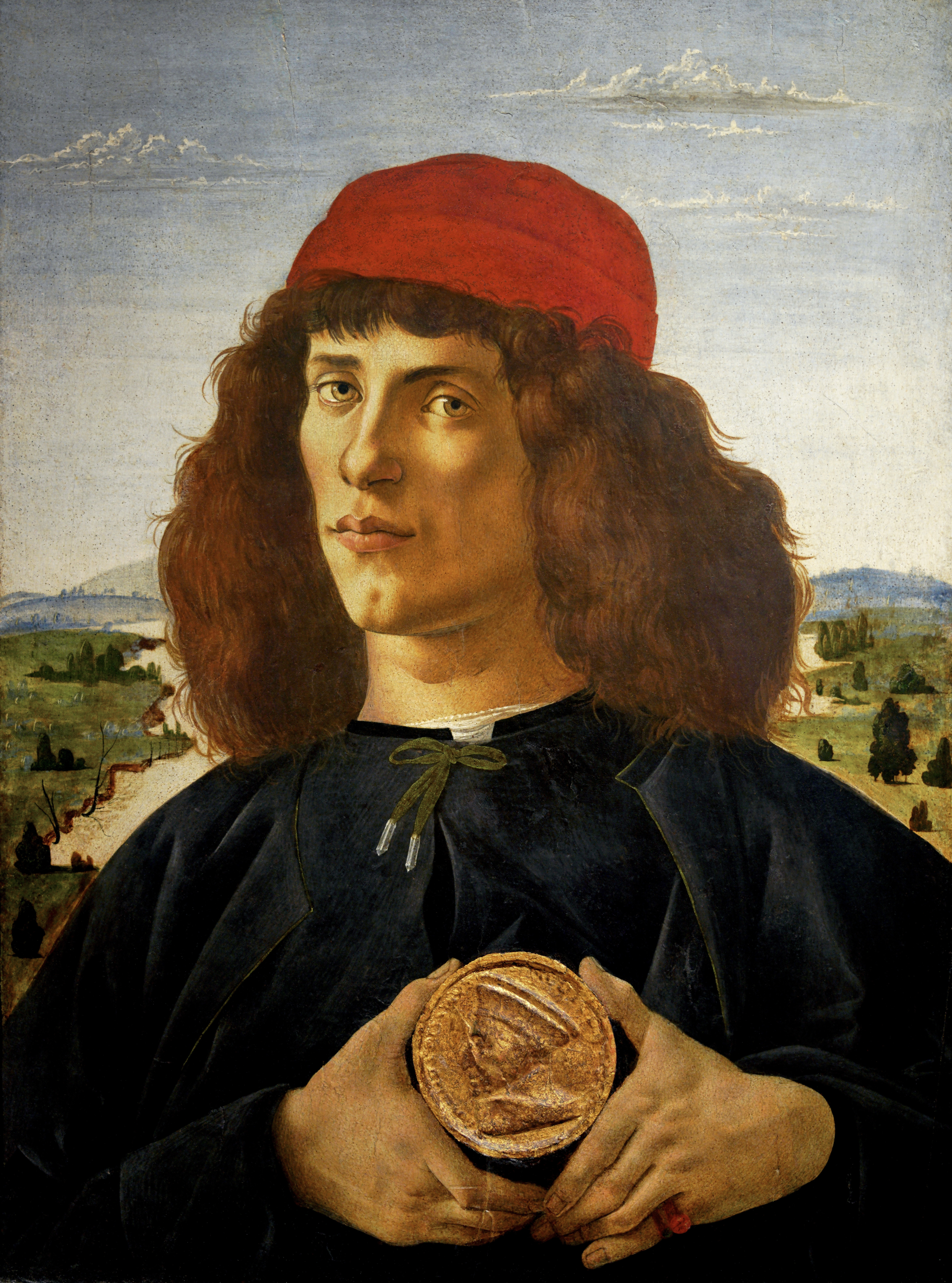
- Artist: Sandro Botticelli
- Year: c. 1474–1475
- Medium: Tempera on panel
- Dimensions: 57.5 cm × 44 cm (22.6 in × 17 in)
- Location: Uffizi, Florence

Portrait of a Man with a Medal of Cosimo the Elder, also known as Portrait of a Youth with a Medal, is a tempera painting by Italian Renaissance painter Sandro Botticelli. The painting features a young man displaying in triangled hands a medal stamped with the likeness of Cosimo de' Medici. The identity of the young man has been a long-enduring mystery. Completed in approximately 1475, it is on display in the Uffizi Gallery of Florence.

Central to the painting, seated before a landscape, is a young man with a medal between his hands. The man gazes out into the audience, while the medal displays the profiled likeness of Cosimo de' Medici. The medal is a pastiglia imitation of a real metal medal, made of gilded gesso and inset into the portrait. As the medal is not reversed, evidently Botticelli either had access to the original mold or made a cast from the medal to produce his gesso. The medal appears to be the same as one possibly designed by Donatello and cast in 1465, an example of which is in the collection of the Victoria and Albert Museum in London, England, called "Cosimo de' Medici as Pater Patriae".

== Identity of the subject ==
The identity of the young man in the portrait has never been agreed, but there has been considerable speculation. Writing in 1900, art historian George Noble Plunkett colorfully identified whom he believed the youth portrayed:

one realizes painfully that this is the Piero who has left an indelible stain on the Medici family by his betrayal of Florence. The small covetous eyes, the ignoble nose, the pursed animal mouth, with only the restraint of selfishness on it, the very manner in which he holds up the memorial of his house's founder, as though it were his badge of honor!

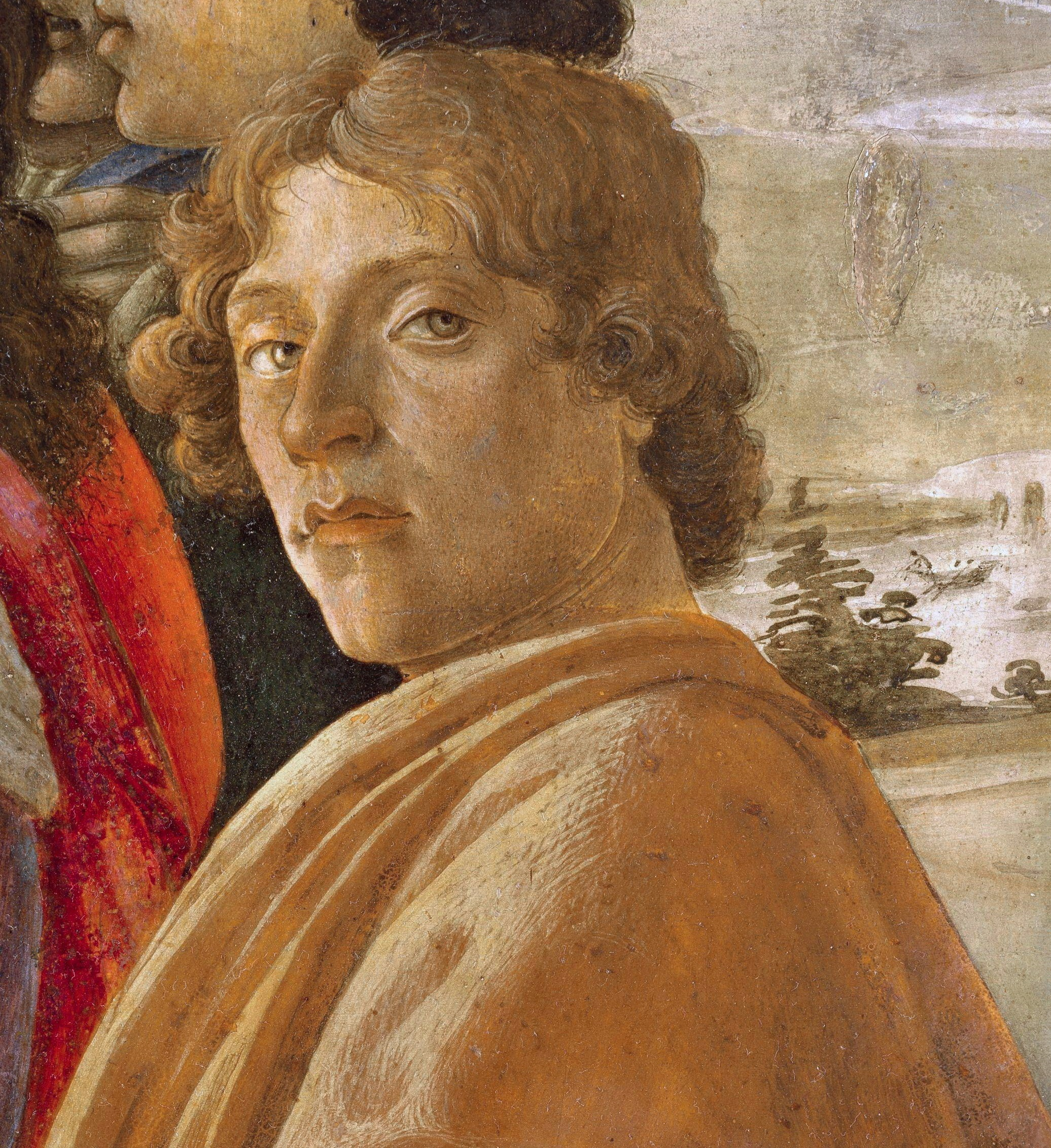
Detail of Botticelli's supposed self-portrait in Adoration of the Magi

Contemporary biographer Guido Cornini notes other theories held by historians: the youth—who wears garments appropriate to the middle class—may be one of the possible designers of the medal (Michelozzo Niccolò Fiorentino, Cristoforo di Geremia), a member of the Medici family (including, possibly, Cosimo de' Medici himself) or, as he personally felt more likely, Antonio Botticelli, Botticelli's brother. This, he asserts, is based on the strength of the likeness of the youth to Botticelli himself, as portrayed in his Adoration of the Magi. Antonio Botticelli had also recast and gilded medals, working in the court of the Medicis. He would have been about 40 at the time of the portrait. Conversely, the direct eye contact could be that of the artist looking in the mirror.

Frederick Hartt suggested it might be Lorenzo di Pierfrancesco de' Medici (Il Popolano, 1463–1503), whose two certain portraits, both profiles on medals, vary considerably, though one resembles this. He is also sometimes claimed to be the subject of other Botticelli portraits, with completely different features (e.g. Pitti Palace, wearing a chaperon).

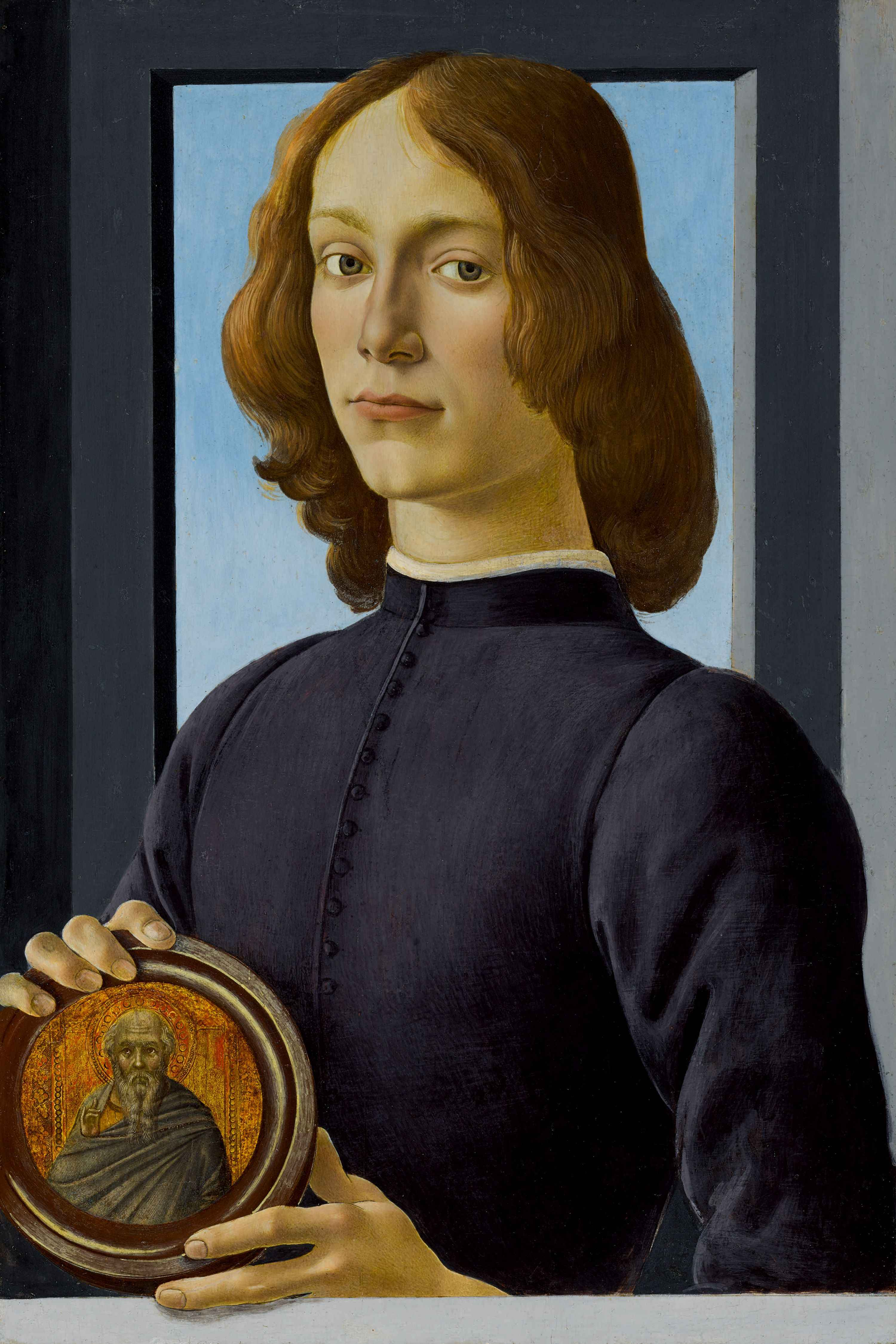
Portrait of a Young Man Holding a Roundel

The appearance at an auction in 1982, from the Thomas Merton collection, of a rarely seen painting by Botticelli of a Portrait of a Young Man Holding a Roundel identified (with no real evidence) as Giovanni il Popolano in a similar pose, holding up a round medallion cut from a much older painting (albeit of a bearded saint, not Cosimo), has led to speculation that this might be a companion piece, and thus that the young man in this portrait is possibly his brother, Lorenzo di Pierfrancesco de' Medici. (the long dark locks and facial features are not dissimilar from those found on Mercury in Botticelli's Primavera, another presumed representation of Lorenzo di Pierfrancesco.) The cut-out now in place may not be the original insertion; it may have been another medal of Cosimo. If so, the meaning of the medallion over the heart may simply be a profession of the loyalty of the cadet branch of the Popolani to the branch of Cosimo.

In Botticelli (2004), Sean Connolly says that some critics also believe that the young man may have been a Medici follower, but notes that "the subject is almost as mysterious as Leonardo's Mona Lisa. Gloria Fossi in Uffizi Gallery (2001) calls the subject "one of the most enigmatic models of the Renaissance."

== Provenance ==
The origin of the painting depends on its model, who remains unknown despite much speculation (see above). It is first recorded with Cardinal Carlo de' Medici. On his death in 1666, it entered the ducal collection in the Uffizi. The painting was restored in 1991.

== See also ==
- List of works by Sandro Botticelli
- Portrait of a Man with a Roman Medal
