= Saint Luke the Evangelist (Master Theodoric) =

Painting by Master Theodoric

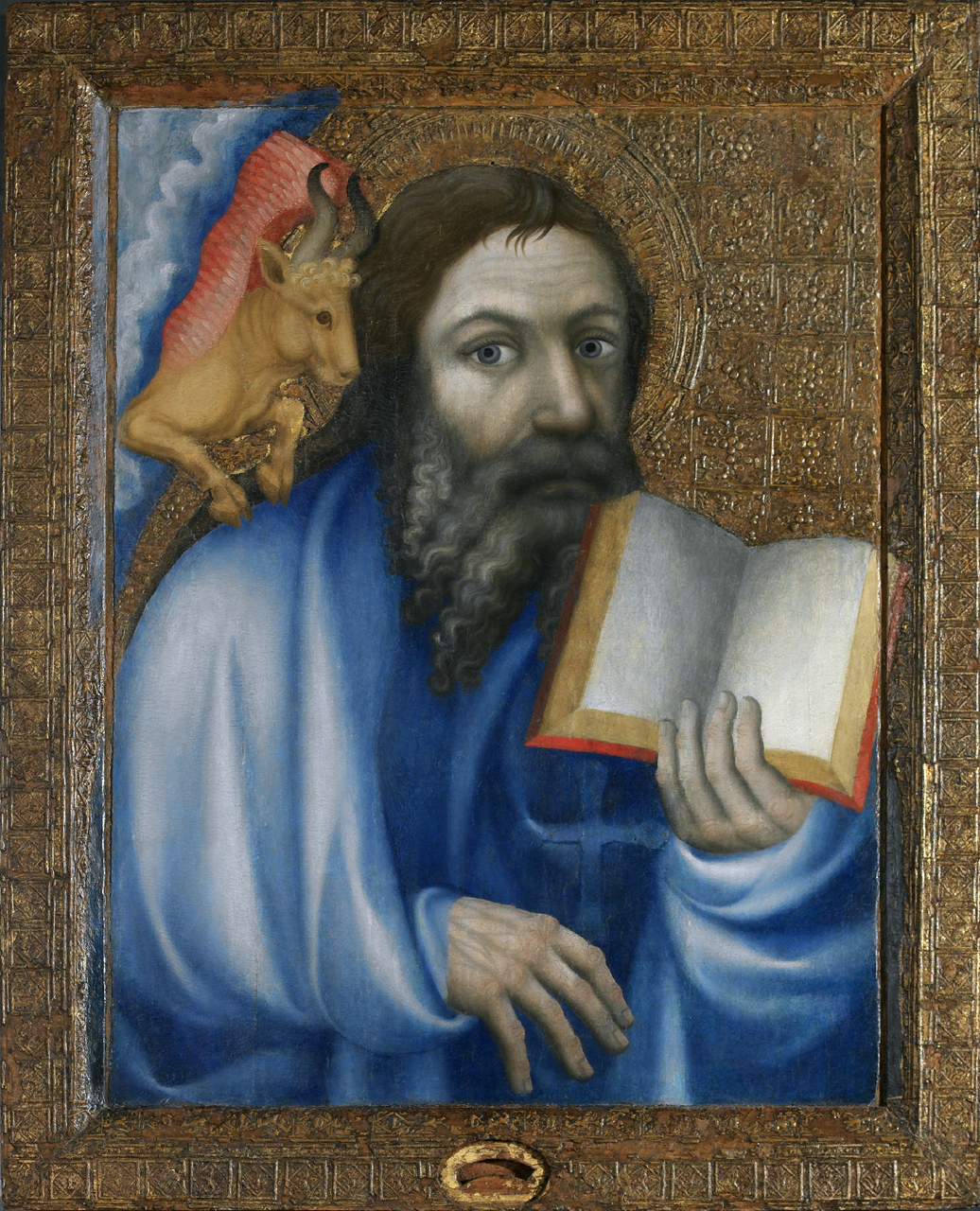
- Saint Luke the Evangelist (Master Theodoric)
- Artist: Master Theodoric
- Year: c. 1360
- Medium: oil tempera on beech board
- Dimensions: 115 cm × 94 cm (45 in × 37 in)
- Location: National Gallery, Prague

Saint Luke the Evangelist is one of the most impressive panel paintings by Master Theodoric, intended for the decoration of the Chapel of the Holy Cross in Karlštejn. It may be a self-portrait of Theodoric himself. It is exhibited in the collection of medieval art of the National Gallery in Prague.

== Description and classification ==
Oil tempera on beech board measuring 115 x 94 cm. The frame with printed ornament contains an elliptical reliquary opening at the bottom. The painting has been preserved in its original form from around 1360 and was restored in 1991 (H. Kohlová).

Theodoric's painting is characterised by an extraordinary sophistication of pictorial expression and colour balance. The drapery is modelled in relief and uses incident light to illuminate the top layer, while the deep parts are highlighted with dark blue. The drapery itself consists of a motif of long vertical folds on the right forearm, short transverse lines around the upraised left hand with a book, and deep bowl-like folds in the center. The painter used azurite and lead white as the ground and the rarest pigment, ultramarine blue, as the top layer. The blue is balanced by white, ochre and red.

The head of St. Luke is modelled with knowledge of real physiognomy, and its expression is enlivened by the direct gaze of the eyes on the viewer. It is characterized by the typical features of Theodoric's style - the slightly larger-than-life size of the broad face, the grey incarnation and the rich beard. The veins on the hands are realistically depicted and the left hand holding the book is rendered in perspective. The painting, like other paintings by Theodoric, extends partly onto the frame. The painter thus disrupts the regular geometric order of the picture frames on the wall of the Chapel of the Holy Cross, which limited his creative freedom. This is also evident in the generous conception of the test sketches that have survived on the chapel wall, by which the painter verified the format and proportional relationships with respect to the dimensions of the wall.

Luke's attribute, the winged bull, is painted with a great degree of realism in the upper left corner of the painting. The background of the painting consists of a plastic decorative ornament known as pastiglia, which originated in Italy and was almost exclusively used in Bohemia by Theodoric. The background was originally gilded, as some of Theodoric's paintings retain traces of gold or show damage caused by the removal of gilded ornaments. This happened at the beginning of the 15th century during the siege of Karlštejn by the Hussites, when it was necessary to pay the defenders' rents. The saint held a cross in his right hand, the outline of which and traces of its attachment have been preserved.

Theodoric's stocky and short stature, massive head with fleshy cheeks and protruding nose, and wide-open eyes with large pupils reveal a knowledge of human anatomy. The impression of material corporeality is also reinforced by the shallowly modelled and poorly articulated draperies, whose relief is created by muting local colour tones rather than deepening the intensity of the colours. The sharpness of the contours is replaced by greyscale transitions. The monumental construction of the picture, the generous and relaxed painterly presentation and the treatment of muted colours have no predecessors in European Gothic art and place Theodoric among the most important Gothic painters in Europe.

=== The results of the technological survey of the painting ===
The construction of the thin beechwood backing board, which is covered with canvas at the joints, is originally from the Netherlands. The technique of execution reveals familiarity with French painting en grissaille, popular in Paris in the mid-14th century. The painting follows a highly detailed and sovereignly executed underdrawing executed with fine strokes. Only the modelling of the face is subject to minor changes. The ground layer consists of lead white on a chalk ground. The colour layer consists of egg tempera interspersed with intermediate layers of walnut oil. These prevented rapid drying and allowed perfect modelling of volumes with thin glaze layers. Theodoric is characterised by the complex construction of the ground and covering colour layers, of which there are usually up to six in the draperies. The painter took care in selecting the grain size of the pigment, achieving high transparency of the layers with the help of an oil binder. The incarnations are usually painted in a single layer and the colours are the result of mixing pigments on the palette.

=== Derivative works ===
The Czech Post issued a commemorative postage stamp with a reproduction of the painting of St. Luke on 15 November 2000. The stamp, valued at CZK 13, is 40x50 mm and is a five-colour steel plate print in black, red, blue, light blue and ochre. The author of the engraving is Miloš Ondráček.

=== St. Luke - patron saint of painters ===
St. Luke is the patron saint of the painters' guild and is often depicted as the painter of the Virgin Mary. His attributes include a winged bull, a pen and a book or scroll. Theodoric was the head of the painters' guild in Prague from about the mid 1360s and his painting of St. Luke is one of his best works. For Charles IV, this painting was of special significance because in 1354 he received the entire skull of the saint as a relic. It is now part of the St. Vitus Cathedral Treasure.

The first depictions of St. Luke date back to the 8th century (Codex Aureus of Lorsch). In the 13th century, Cimabue painted a fresco of St. Luke in the upper church of Assisi. Later he was the subject of many famous painters (Correggio, Frans Hals, El Greco, Titian, Guercino, Luca Giordano). In the Czech lands, St. Luke (painting the Crucifix) is depicted, for example, in the Gospel of John of Opava (1368) or in a painting by Jan Gossaert from 1520 (National Gallery Prague).

=== St. Luke in the works of painters ===
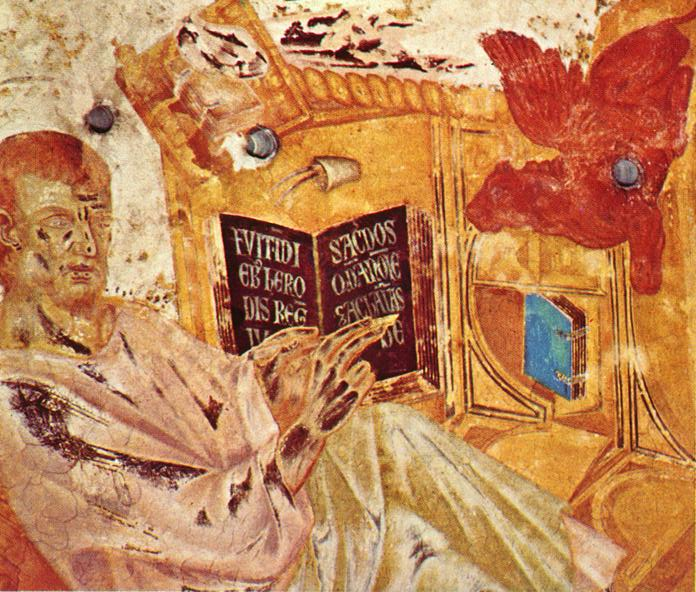
St Luke, Cimabue (1280–83)

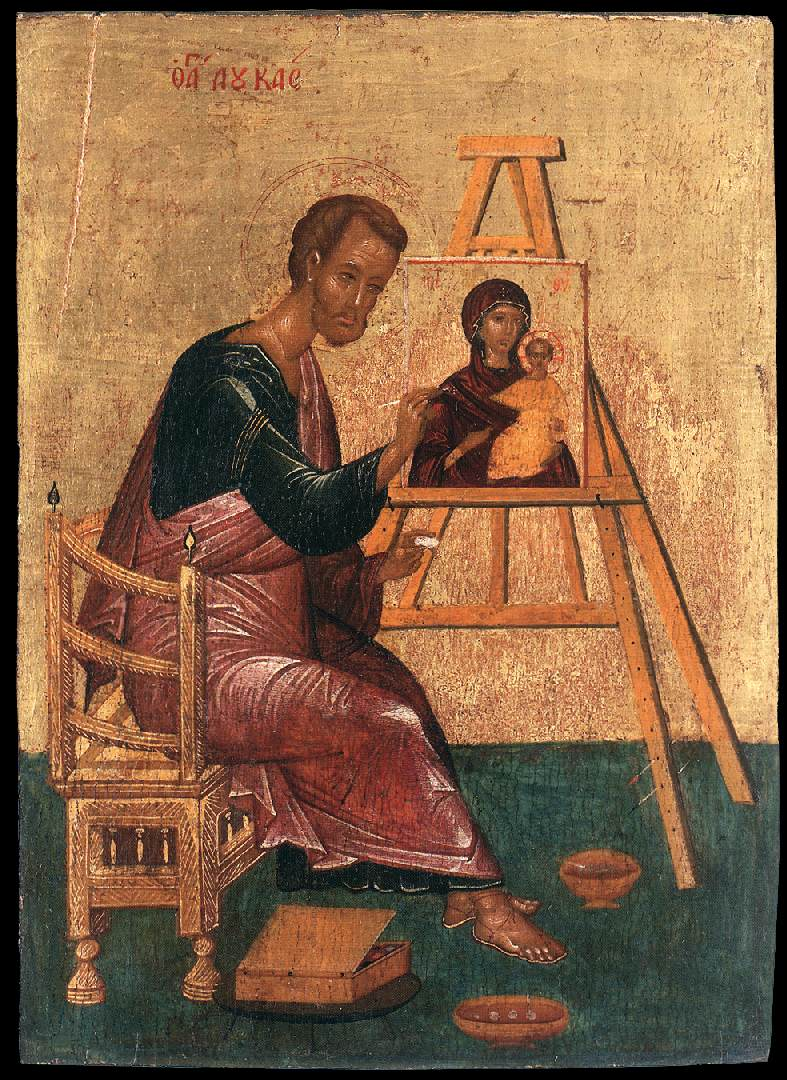
Unknown painter - Luke Paints the Icon of the Mother of God Hodegetria (early 15th century)

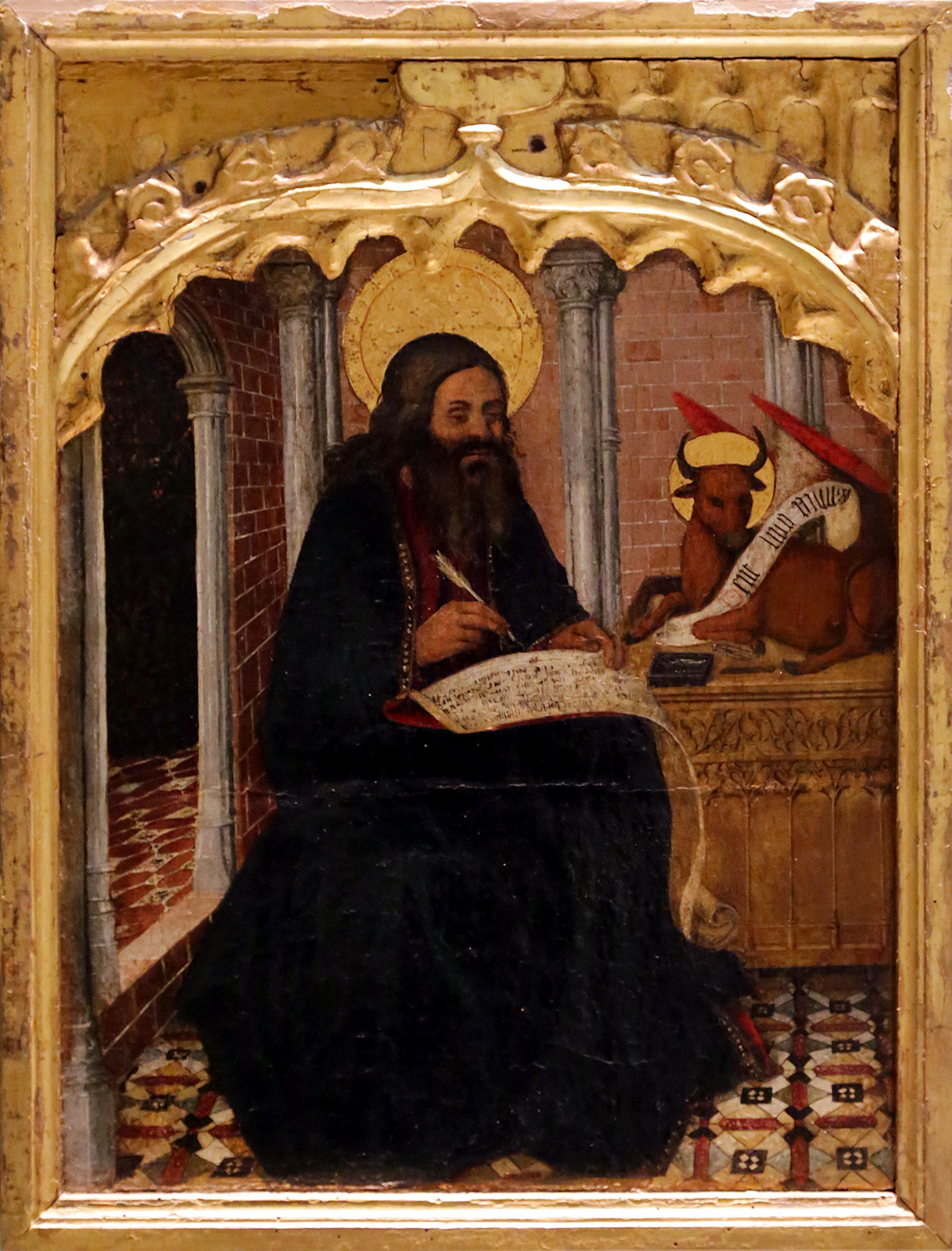
St. Luke, Juan Rexach (15th century)

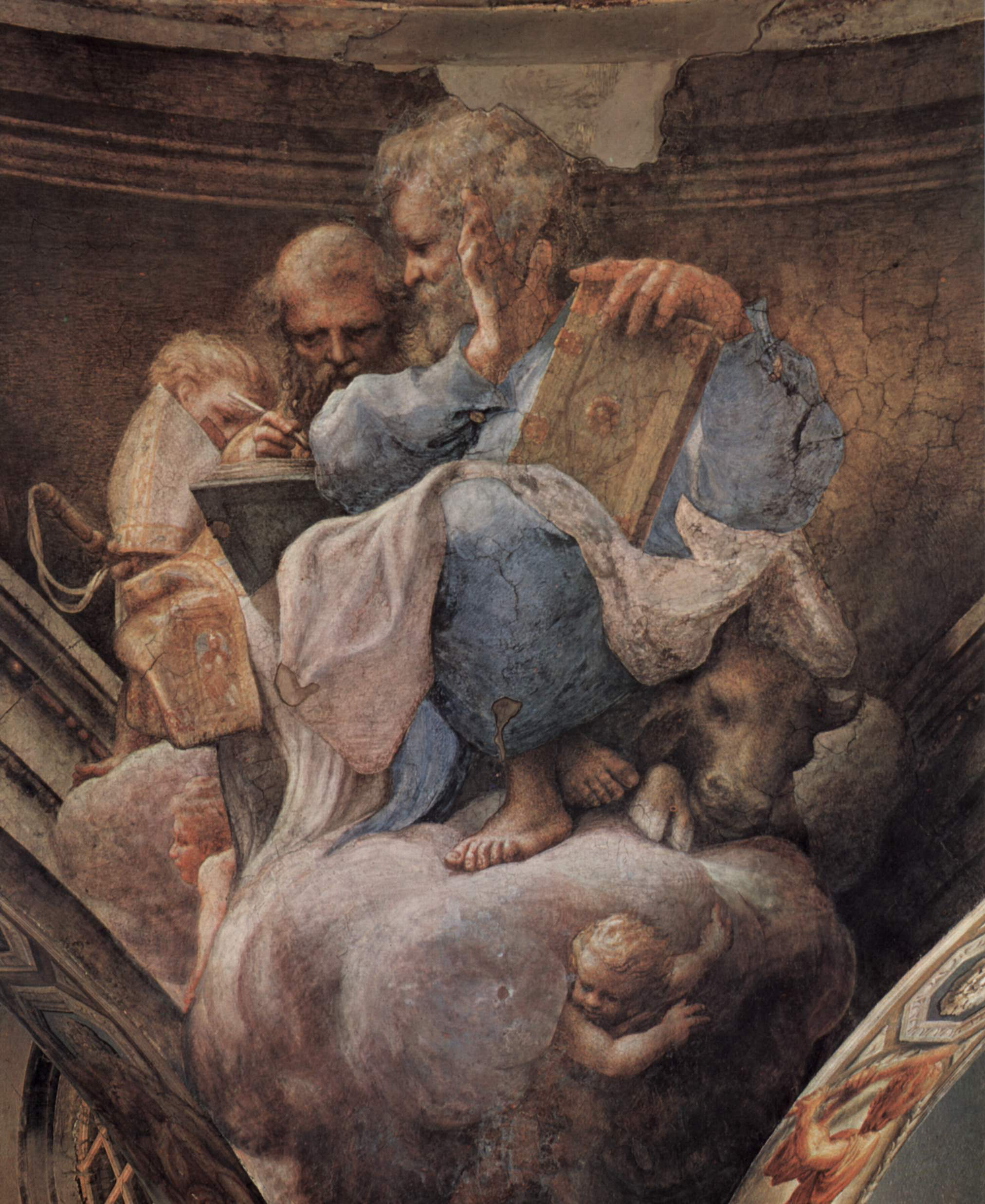
St. Luke, Corregggio (1520)

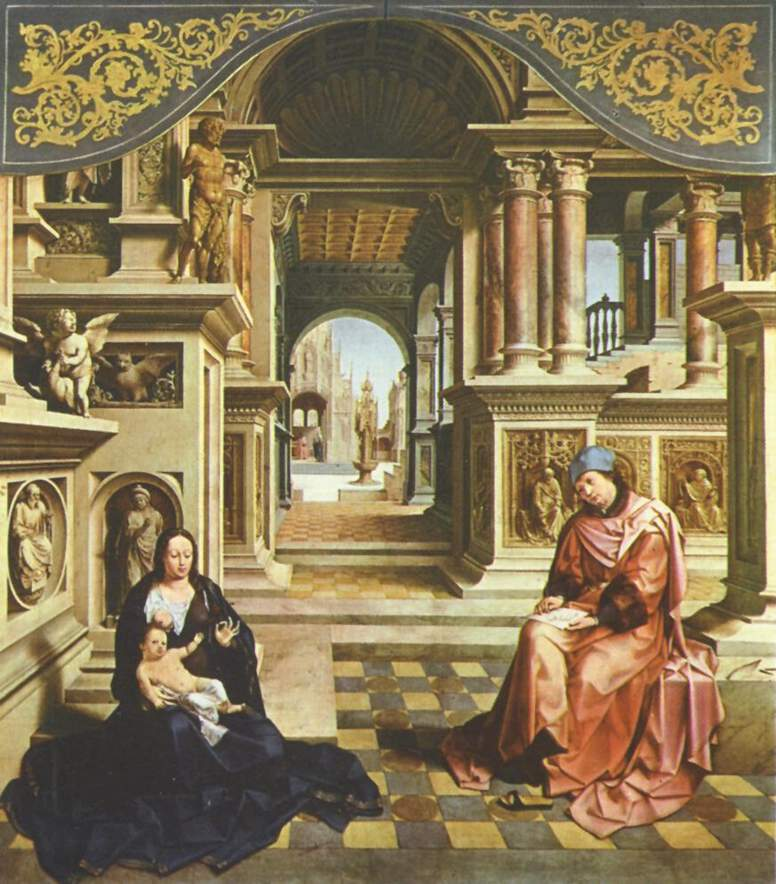
St. Luke painting P. Maria, Jan Gossaert (1520), National Gallery Prague

== Source ==
- Jiří Fajt (ed.), Magister Theodoricus, court painter to Emperor Charles IV, National Gallery in Prague 1997, ISBN 80-7035-142-X
- Pujmanová Olga, The Art of the Time of Charles IV and its Relations to Naples, pp. 217–240, in: International Scientific Conference: The Time of Charles IV in the History of the Nations of the Czechoslovakia, Charles University, Prague 1982
- Pešina Jaroslav, Panel Painting. Czech Gothic Art 1350–1420, Academia Prague 1970
- Dvořáková, Vlasta, Menclová Dobroslava, Karlštejn, State Publishing House of Beautiful Literature and Art, Prague 1965
- Matějček Antonín, Czech Gothic Painting. Panel painting 1350–1450. Melantrich Prague 1950
