= Portrait of a Man with a Roman Medal =

Painting by Has Memling

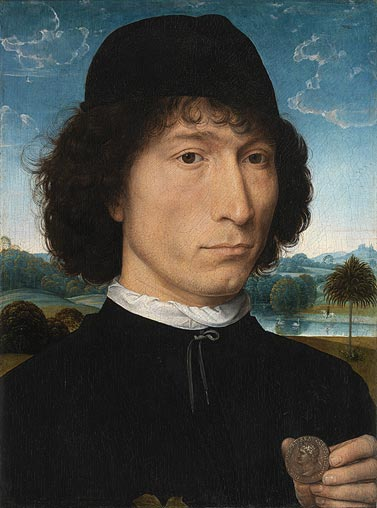
- Artist: Hans Memling
- Year: c. 1480
- Medium: Oil on panel
- Dimensions: 31 cm × 23.2 cm (12 in × 9.1 in)
- Location: Royal Museum of Fine Arts, Antwerp

The Portrait of a Man with a Roman Medal is a painting by the German-born Flemish artist Hans Memling, dating to c. 1480 and housed in the Royal Museum of Fine Arts, Antwerp, Belgium.

== Description ==
The painting portrays a man from a three-quarter point of view, with an attention to details typical of Flemish painting. The man is wearing a black coat and a hat of the same color. In the left hand, he is showing a sestertius of emperor Nero, a symbol of his attention to Humanism. In the background is a lake landscape: Memling was one of the first painters to use natural landscapes for backgrounds of portraits (instead of the traditional black one), influencing later Renaissance artists such as Sandro Botticelli and Pietro Perugino.

The identity of the subject is unknown. It has been supposed that he could be one of the numerous Italians living at the time in Antwerp or Bruges, who often commissioned artworks to local painters. It has been variously identified as Bernardo Bembo, or with the Florentine artist Niccolò di Forzore Spinelli, who died in Lyon, where the painting was in the early 19th century. Or it may be Giovanni di Candida.

== See also ==
- Portrait of a Man with a Medal of Cosimo the Elder

== Sources ==
- Zuffi, Stefano (2004). Il Quattrocento. Milan: Electa. ISBN 88-370-2315-4.
