= Westminster Abbey Museum =

Coordinates: 51.49876°N 0.12753°W

The Westminster Abbey Museum was located in the 11th-century vaulted undercroft beneath the former monks' dormitory in Westminster Abbey, London, England. This was located in one of the oldest areas of the abbey, dating back almost to the foundation of the Romanesque church by Edward the Confessor in 1065. This space had been used as a museum since 1908.

== Exhibits ==
The exhibits included a unique collection of royal and other funeral effigies (funeral saddle, helm and shield of Henry V), together with other treasures, including some panels of medieval glass, 12th-century sculpture fragments, Mary II's coronation chair and replicas of the coronation regalia. There also were effigies of Edward III, Henry VII and his queen, Elizabeth of York, Charles II, William III, Mary II and Queen Anne.

A later addition to the display was the late 13th-century Westminster Retable, England's oldest altarpiece, which was most probably designed for the high altar of the abbey. Although damaged in past centuries, the panel was expertly cleaned and conserved.

The museum was closed and replaced by the Queen's Diamond Jubilee Galleries, in the triforium of the main abbey building.
