= Pastiglia =

Low relief decoration

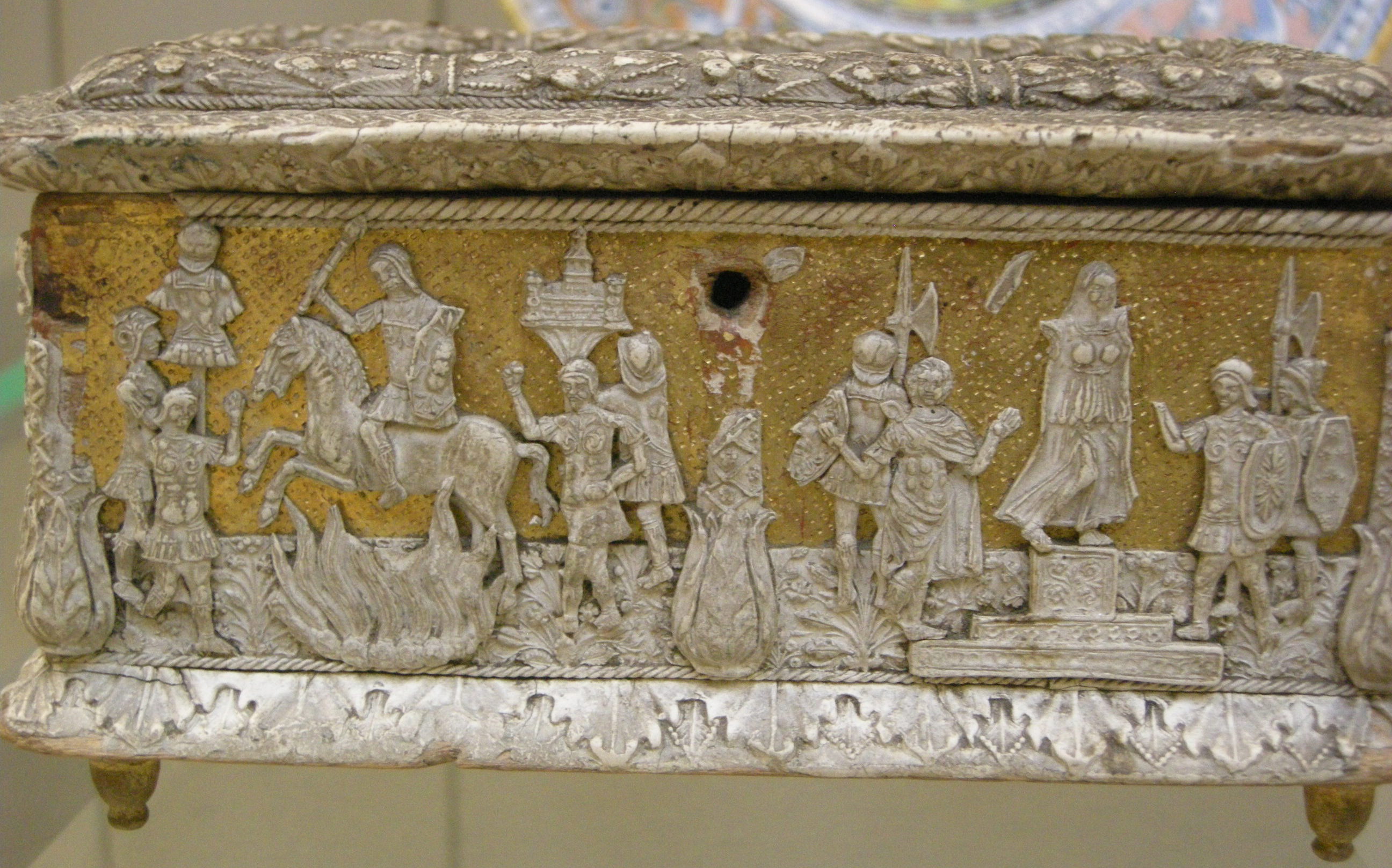
White lead pastiglia on an Italian casket, late 15th century, with Marcus Curtius at left, British Museum.

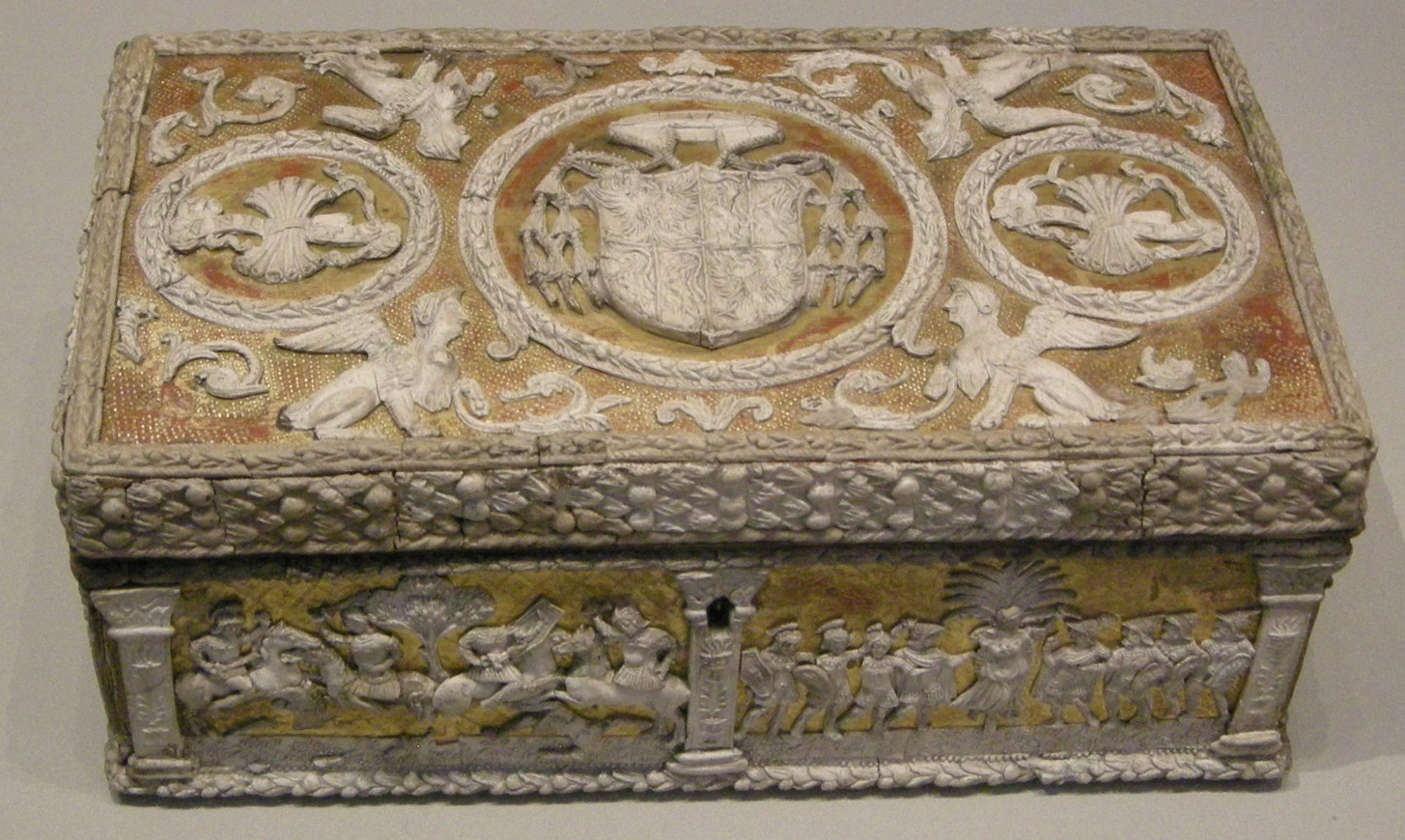
The casket made for Cardinal Bernardo Clesio, whose arms allow it to be dated to 1530–38, V&A

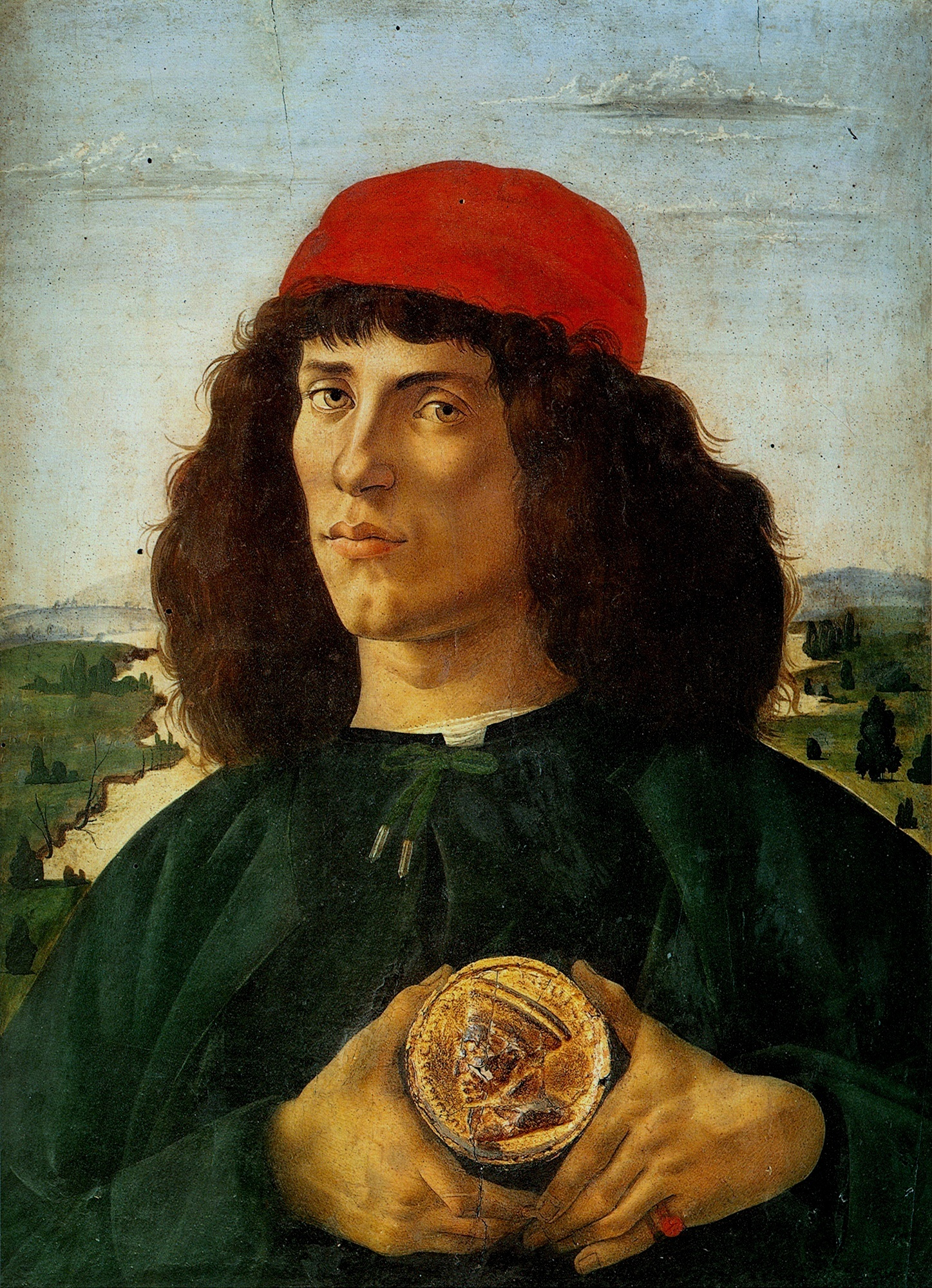
Portrait of a Man with a Medal of Cosimo the Elder, Botticelli, with pastiglia medal

Pastiglia [paˈstiʎʎa], an Italian term meaning "pastework", is low relief decoration, normally modelled in gesso or white lead, applied to build up a surface that may then be gilded or painted, or left plain. The technique was used in a variety of ways in Italy during the Renaissance. The term is mostly found in English applied to gilded work on picture frames or small pieces of furniture such as wooden caskets and cassoni, and also on areas of panel paintings, but there is some divergence as to the meaning of the term between these specialisms.

On frames and furniture the technique is in origin a cheaper imitation of woodcarving, metalwork or ivory carving techniques. Within paintings, the technique gives areas with a three-dimensional effect, usually those representing inanimate objects, such as foliage decoration on architectural surrounds, halos and details of dress, rather than parts of figures. In white lead pastiglia on caskets, the subject matter is usually classical, with a special emphasis on stories from Ancient Roman history.

== White lead pastiglia ==
In reference to work on picture frames and paintings moulded and gilded gesso is still commonly described as pastiglia, but in recent decades writers on furniture and the decorative arts tend to distinguish between this and "true" pastiglia, or white lead pastiglia which is defined as being made from white lead powder, made by combining powdered lead and vinegar in an anaerobic environment, bound with egg white. White lead bound with oil or egg yolk was also the most common pigment for white paint. White lead pastiglia is very delicate and used for small areas only, but can produce very fine detail. It was mainly used on small caskets and boxes. Sections were typically pre-moulded, doubtless from metal matrices to judge from the crisp detail, and glued on when hard.

This was usually left unpainted, when it looked like carved ivory, which had been widely used to decorate boxes in Italy, by the Embriachi and others, but was by now less used, partly because it was too rare and expensive. The wood from which the main box was made was normally alder. It seems the term pastiglia for this only dates to the 17th century, after the technique had largely fallen from use. A scented variant called pasta di muschio ("musk paste") mixed musk perfume with the white lead, and was thought to be "aphrodisiacal", and so used for caskets given at a marriage, and also other objects such as inkwells and frames for hand mirrors.

White lead pastiglia was a north Italian speciality, produced between about 1450 and 1550. Six workshops were identified by Patrick M. De Winter, although their location remains uncertain; the Workshop of the Love and Moral Themes, whose products seem the most numerous, was possibly at Ferrara, where the painter Cosimo Tura began his career gilding caskets. Venice is also thought to have produced them. Other workshops identified by De Winter include the "Workshop of the main Berlin casket" and "Workshop of the Cleveland Casket".

The subjects were typically classical, drawn from both mythology and Ancient Roman history (especially the early period covered by Livy), but biblical ones are also found. Compositions can often be shown to be borrowed from another medium, such as prints or bronze plaquettes, and sections from the same mould can be found repeated, and used on more than one piece. The Victoria and Albert Museum has an armorial casket which is the only example that can be fairly closely dated, using the career of its owner, Cardinal Bernardo Clesio, as it must date to between his elevation as cardinal in 1530 and his resignation as Prince-bishop of Trent in 1538. De Winter catalogued 115 white lead pastiglia caskets, only ten of which were over 20 cm high or deep. Another of this relatively large type was sold at auction in 2010. Despite usually having locks, their thin alderwood frame meant that the caskets were probably too fragile to be used for really valuable items like jewellery, and they are thought to have been used for a variety of small objects including cosmetics and collections of seals, coins and the like.

In 2002, the Lowe Art Museum at the University of Miami in Coral Gables, Florida held an exhibition of Pastiglia Boxes: Hidden Treasures of the Italian Renaissance from the collection of the Galleria Nazionale d'arte antica in Rome, and an 80-page exhibition catalogue was published in English and Italian.

== Gesso pastiglia ==
Gesso pastiglia is mostly found in Italy in the 14th to 16th centuries, where pastiglia on larger pieces of furniture such as cassoni, and on picture frames, was more likely to be gilded gesso than true white lead pastiglia. Both panel paintings and gilded frames had a thin flat layer of gesso as part of their preparation, to which the pastiglia decoration was added. On furniture and frames the gesso seems sometimes to have been carved from a thicker flat surface in a subtractive technique, and sometimes built up in an additive one, for smaller and larger areas respectively. Another additive technique was to simply pipe the gesso from a bag through a nozzle, like icing a cake, to give long round lines, often used as the tendrils in foliage designs. It was then always gilded or painted, usually the former. The technique was very widely used in painted panels while gold-ground paintings remained the norm for altarpieces, along with a range of other techniques for decorating plain gilded surfaces such as stamping, engraving or scratching lines, and stippling, punching or pricking dots. In Gothic architectural frames for polyptychs, pastiglia is very commonly used to decorate small flat areas such as spandrels and behind scalloped edges. The technique is described at the end of the technical handbook by Cennino Cennini, whose own paintings made use of it, although he does not use the term himself.

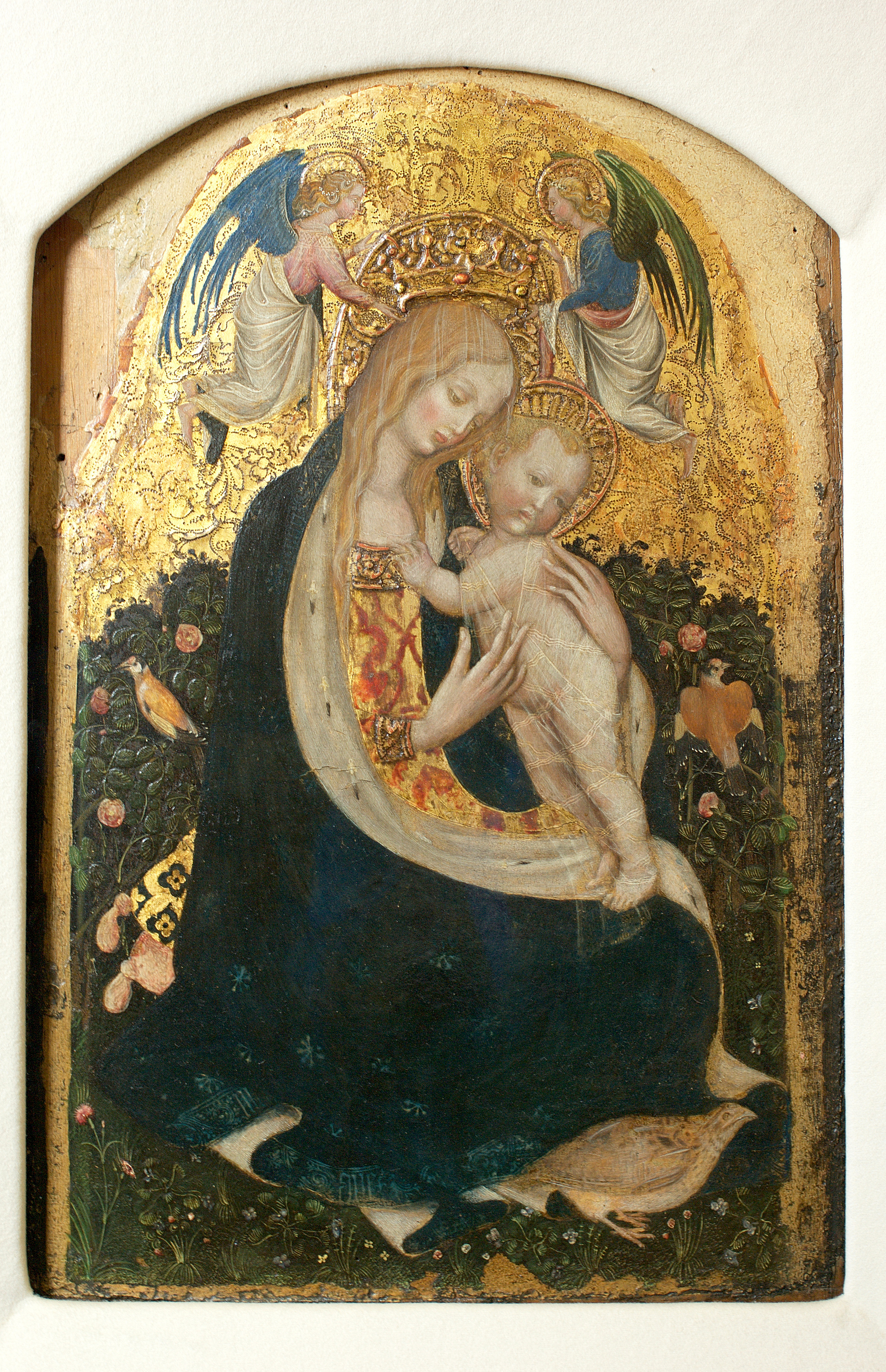
Madonna of the Quail by Pisanello

With the decline of the gold-ground style it became rarer within paintings, as opposed to frames, but was sometimes used for highlights, or a particular purpose. A famous portrait by Sandro Botticelli, who trained as a goldsmith, Portrait of a Man with a Medal of Cosimo the Elder (Uffizi, c. 1474), has the medal the subject is holding executed in gilded pastiglia, which apparently is an impression moulded from the original matrix for the metal medals, some of which survive.

Pisanello frequently used the technique; his The Vision of Saint Eustace (National Gallery, probably about 1540) shows a very fancily dressed courtier on a horse, and has pastiglia highlights on medallions on the horse harness, and the gold mounts on his hunting horn and his spurs, all gilded and representing pieces of goldsmith work. Such highlights are seen on other paintings by Pisanello, who was the leading medalist of his day, and familiar with modelling and casting techniques. Similar pastiglia medallions on horse-harness are found in the fresco Saint George and the Princess (Verona), and the Apparition of the Virgin to Saints Anthony Abbot and George (National Gallery). In his gold-ground Madonna of the Quail (Verona, attributed), the pastiglia is on the halos and borders of the Virgin's dress at neck and cuff, her crown, and in foliage decoration to the gold "sky", all typical locations in earlier religious paintings.

A generation after Pisanello, the conservative Carlo Crivelli continued to use pastiglia highlights in his panels, and it is used in Vincenzo Foppa's Adoration of the Kings (National Gallery) at the end of the century, in the crowns and gifts of the Three Kings.

The technique is rarer in fresco, but there are extensive areas of patterns in the cycle of the life of Queen Theodelinda in Monza Cathedral by the Zavattari family around 1440, no doubt using normal fresco plaster. It was perhaps more common in decorating secular palaces than churches, but the vast majority of Gothic palace decorations are now lost. In England, it was used in the Painted Chamber of Westminster Palace as well as the much-damaged Westminster Retable painted panel, and in Early Netherlandish painting used in works such as the Seilern Triptych attributed to Robert Campin, where the gold skies have elaborate patterns of foliage, with a different design on each panel.

By about 1500, and with the advent of painting on more flexible canvas, which would not be a suitable support for pastiglia, use in painting disappears, but it continued on picture frames, where Renaissance gesso pastiglia generally consisted of vegetal motifs. During the 16th century cassoni and some frames became more massive, and woodcarving replaced pastiglia.

=== Cassoni ===
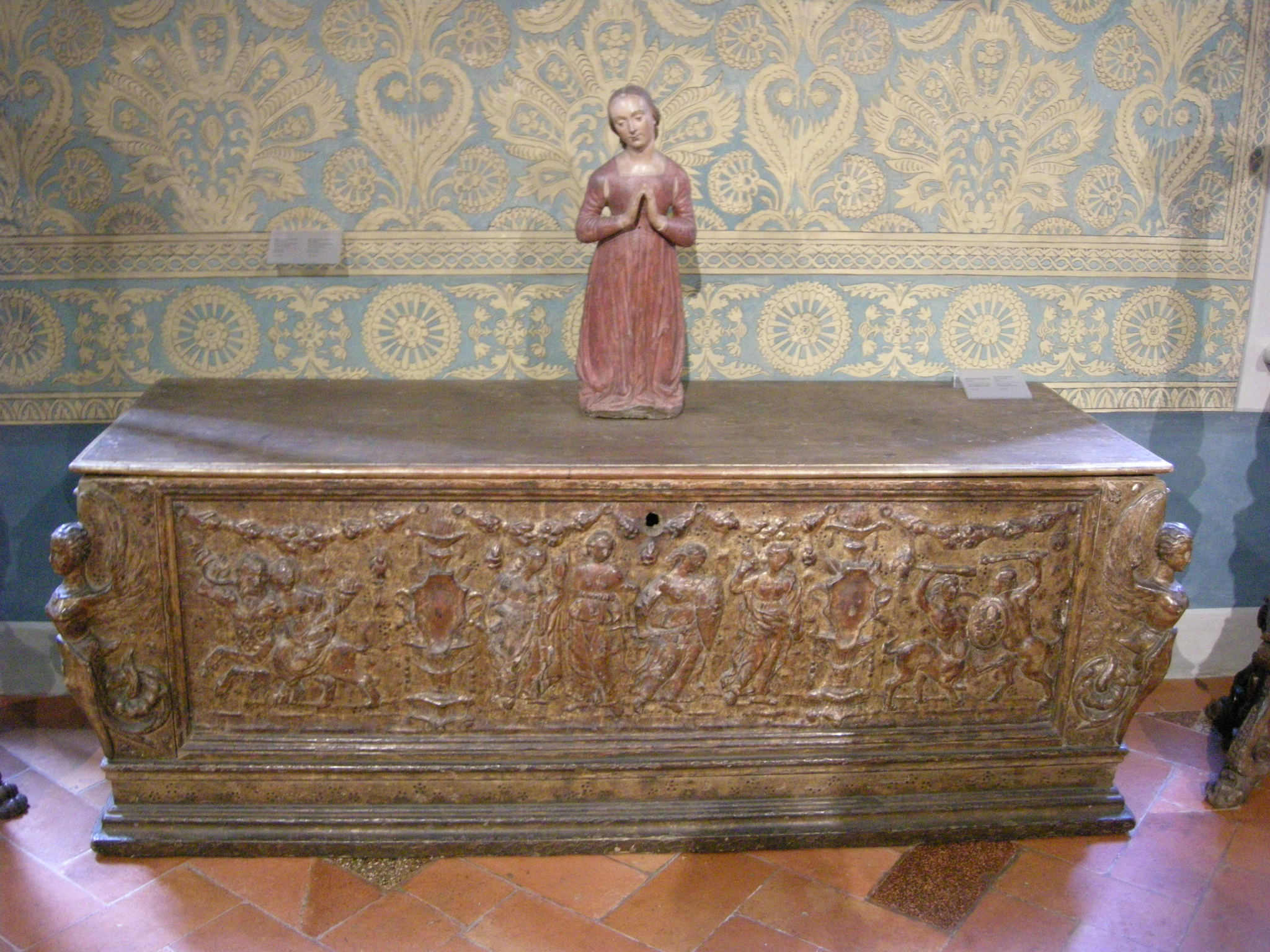
Florentine cassone with gilded pastiglia panel, 15th century

Gesso pastiglia was very widely used on cassoni from the inception of the form in the 14th century. Early decoration tended to be repeated motifs derived from textile designs. Early cassoni were mostly either entirely painted or entirely decorated in gilded pastiglia, but by the 15th century painted panels were inset in elaborate pastiglia surrounds of mouldings - many of the paintings have now been detached and hang in museums. The subjects used for decorating cassoni in either medium had considerable overlap with those on white lead pastiglia caskets, with a heavy bias towards mythology. The paintings were typically by specialized workshops, of less quality than the leading local masters, but in the 15th century, many important painters sometimes produced them. Vasari complained that by his day artists looked down on this work, and by then more massive and elaborately carved walnut cassoni were in fashion.

The Victoria and Albert Museum has a Florentine example of a class of "coffrets" intermediate between caskets and cassoni, which is known by the motto Onesta e bella on its top, and would have been an engagement present from the future husband to his bride, formally presented to her by a representative from his family at her house, filled with small presents from the bridegroom's family. Smaller white lead pastiglia caskets were probably also used on such occasions. Made in about 1400, it is only 23 cm high and 61.5 cm wide and decorated with gilded pastiglia scenes made from gesso dura of courtly hunting and jousting on a painted blue field; these were apparently hand-modelled, not cast.

== Plaquettes in bookbinding ==
Although the term pastiglia is not typically used to describe them, it is appropriate to mention "plaquette" bookbindings here. These are luxury leather bindings which incorporate, normally at the centre of the front cover, small inset plaquettes or roundels with designs in relief, which may be painted in colour. They appear towards the end of the 15th century, probably in Florence or Padua, and were at first used for special presentation volumes. Initially the designs were taken from antique carved gems. It was the famous, and rich, French bibliophile Jean Grolier who was apparently the first to use them systematically for his own books, while he was based in Milan as Treasurer for the French occupation; probably he began to commission them in 1510. He was also the first to use original designs, several of which showed scenes from Livy; altogether 25 Italian plaquette bindings for Grolier survive.

Some just use stamped leather, but for others the material used is variously described as "a sort of gesso mixed with varnish", or just "gesso", but these plaquettes can have extremely fine detail. What may have been Grolier's first such binding has a plaquette with 11 human figures and an architectural setting in a scene about two inches (50 mm) wide, showing Marcus Curtius leaping into the hole, the same subject as on the British Museum casket illustrated at the start of the article.

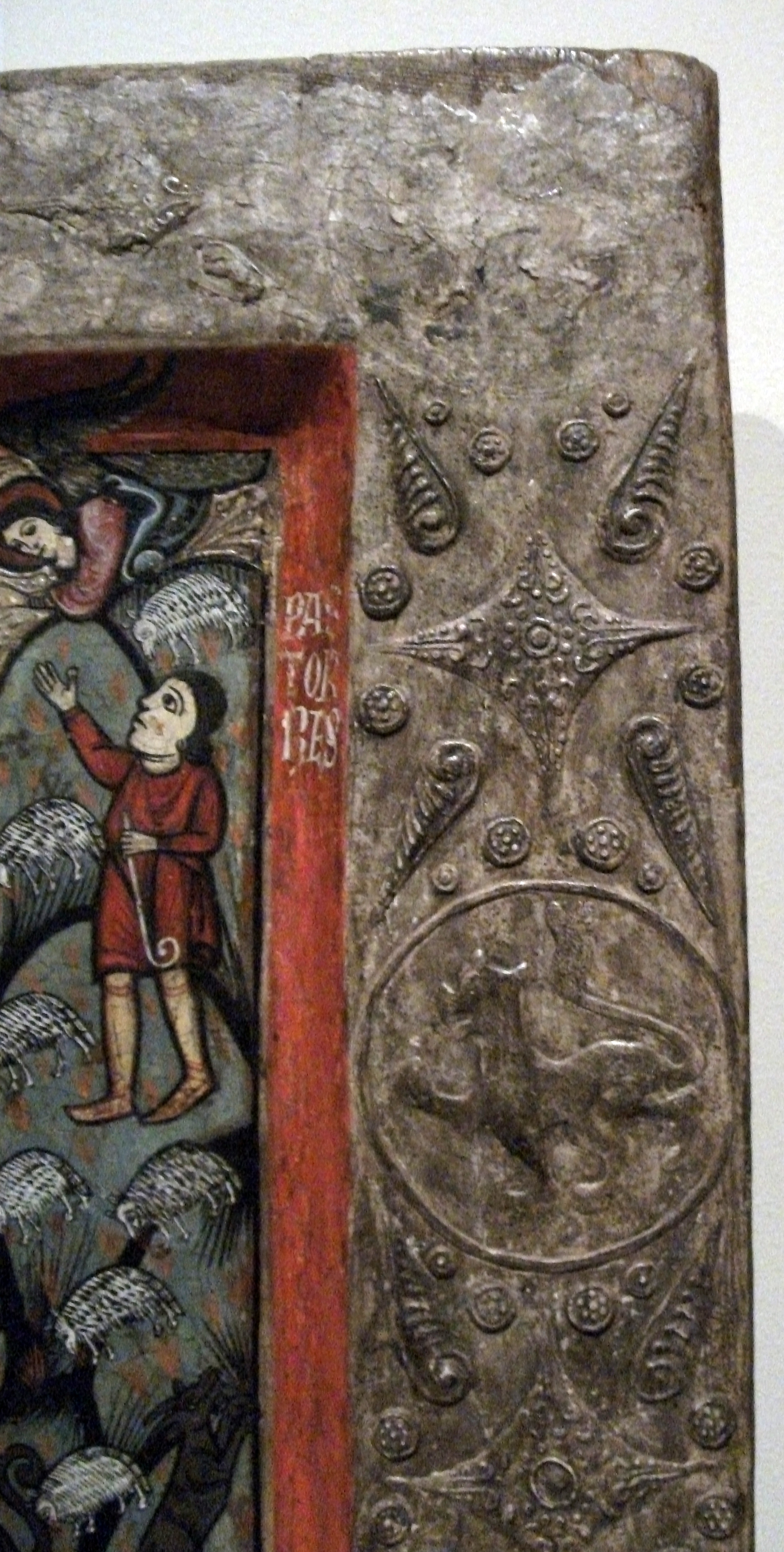
On the frame of a Romanesque Catalan altarpiece

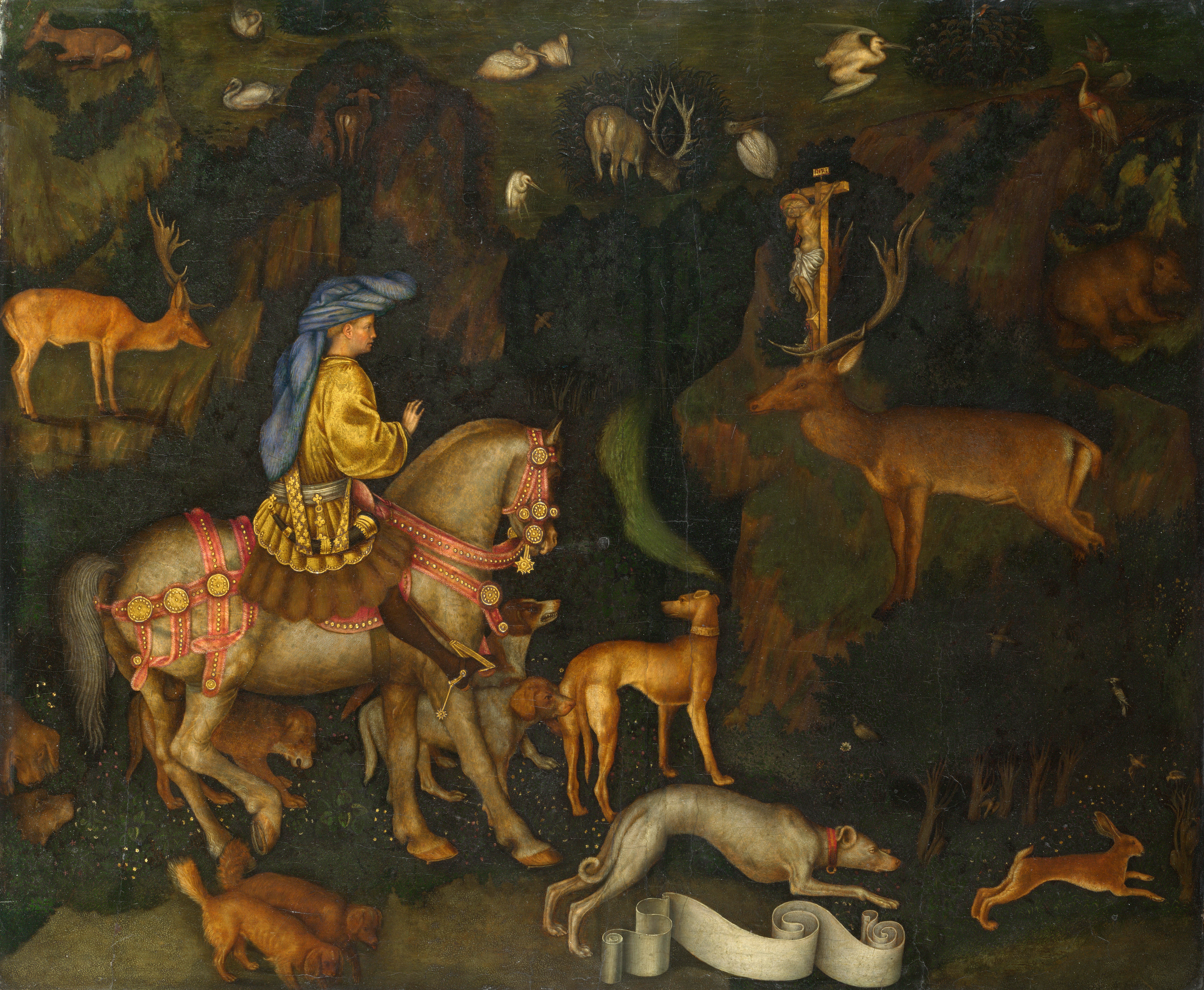
The Vision of Saint Eustace, Pisanello, with pastiglia on the metal parts of the horse trapping

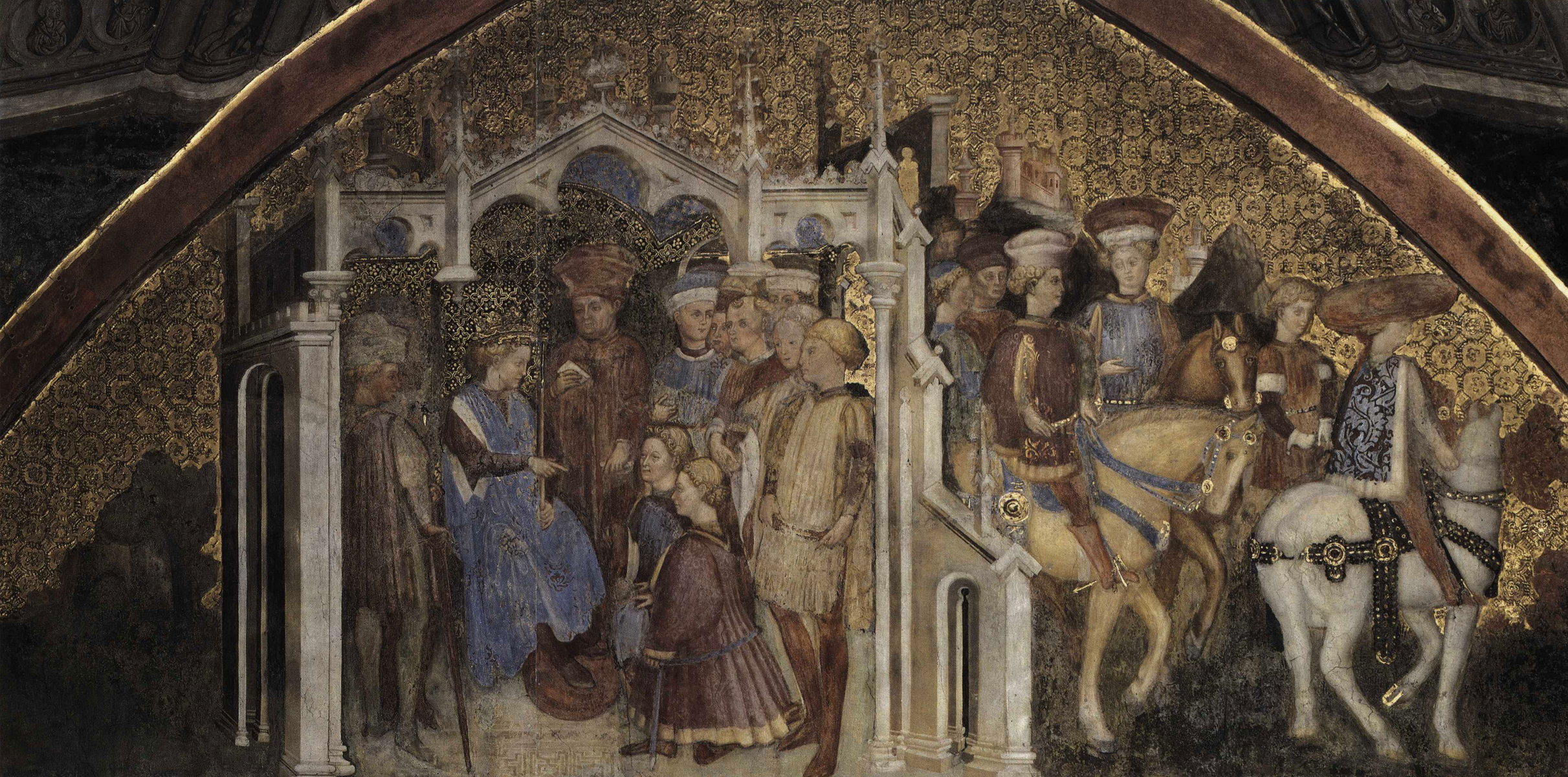
Pastiglia patterning in the gilded "sky" of this fresco by the Zavattari brothers (Theodelinda Chapel, Monza).

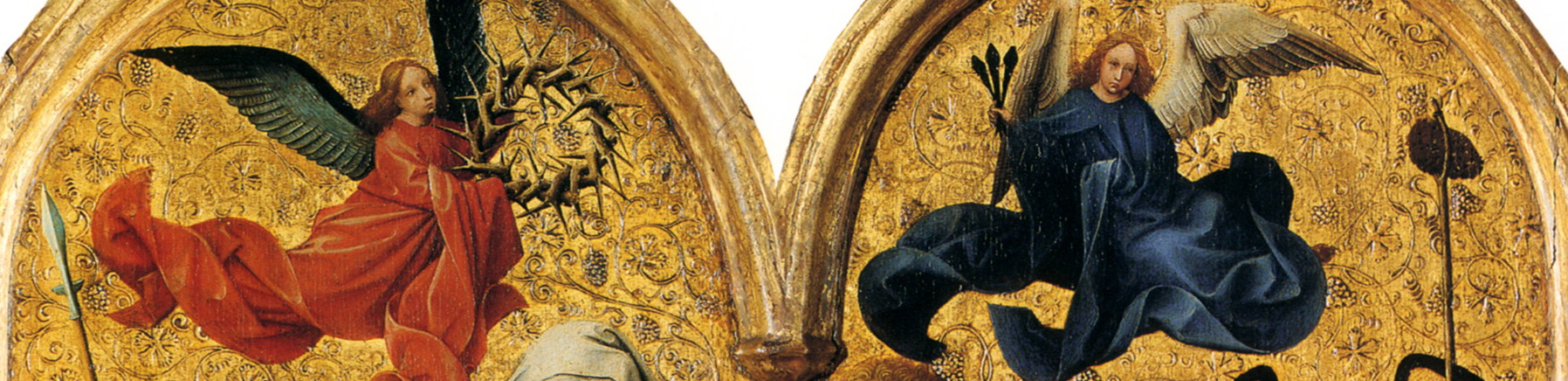
Detail of the Seilern Triptych, Robert Campin, c. 1425
